= Viking Octantis =

Cruise vessel of Viking Ocean Cruises

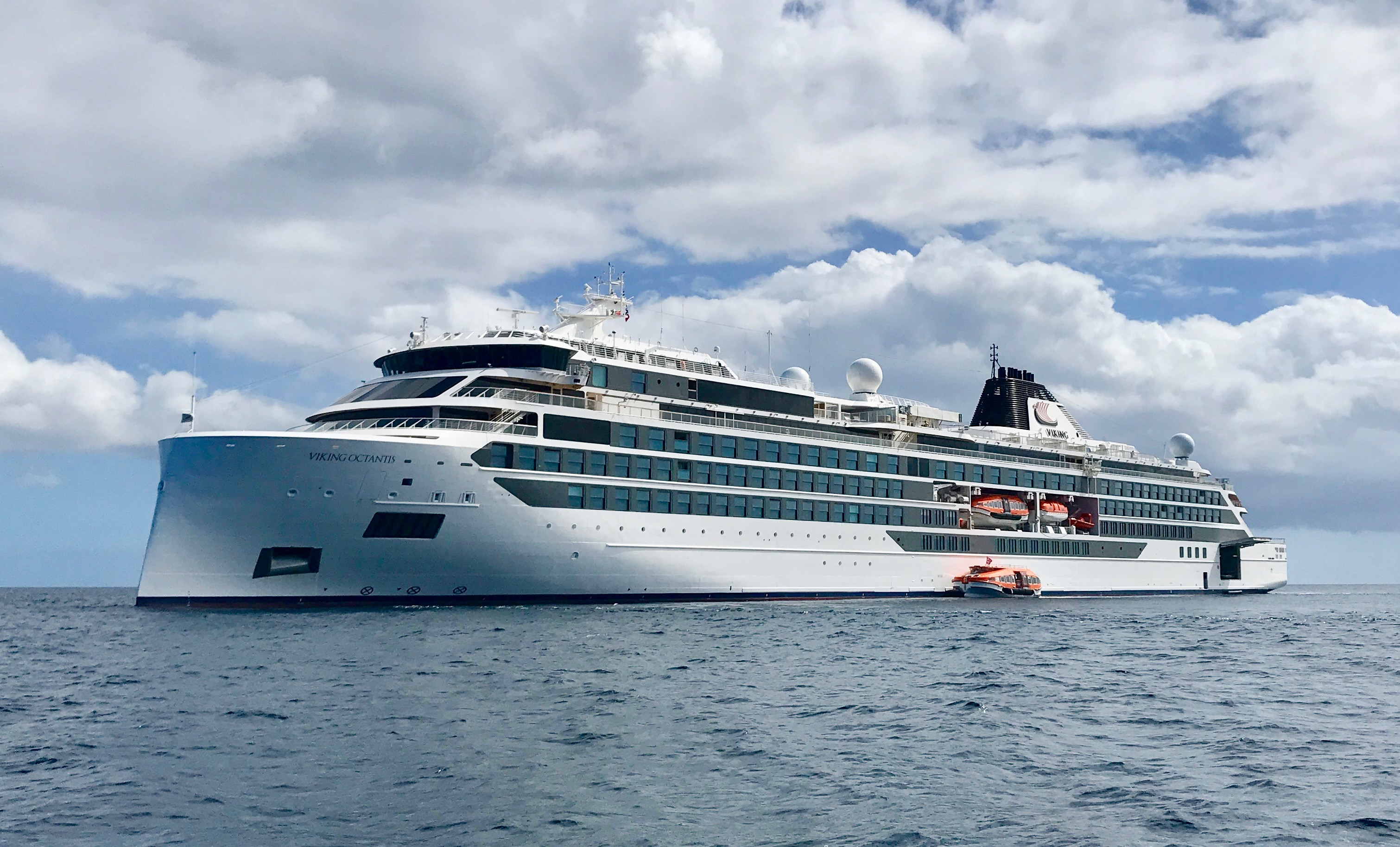
- Viking Octantis anchored off of St. Kitts

History

Norway
- Owner: Torstein Hagen
- Operator: Viking Cruises
- Port of registry: Bergen, Norway
- Route: Various
- Ordered: April 2018
- Builder: Vard (Fincantieri)
- Launched: May 2022
- Sponsored by: Liv Arnesen (godmother)
- Christened: September 30, 2022
- Completed: December 2021
- Maiden voyage: January 2022
- In service: 2022-present

General characteristics
- Type: Expedition ship
- Tonnage: 30,150 GT
- Length: 205 m (672 ft 7 in)
- Beam: 23.5 m (77 ft 1 in)
- Draught: 6 m (19 ft 8 in)
- Ice class: Polar Class 6
- Installed power: MAN engines 4 x 4,800 kW (6,400 hp)
- Propulsion: ABB Azipod 2 x 5,500 kW (7,400 hp)
- Speed: 18 knots (33 km/h; 21 mph)
- Capacity: 378 passengers

Viking Octantis is a Polar Class 6 purpose-built expedition ship completed in December 2021 for Viking Expeditions Cruises, a subdivision of Viking Cruises. The ship has a capacity of 378 passengers with 189 staterooms. Named after the Sigma Octantis, the south star, the ship's primary routes include Antarctica and the Great Lakes where the ship carries out scientific research during its cruises. The ship was joined by an identical sister ship Viking Polaris in fall of 2022.

== Design and construction ==
A letter of intent was signed for two new expedition vessels for Viking Cruises in April 2018. The ship was designed by SMC Design of London and the interiors by Richard Riviere of the interior design firm Rottet Studio of Los Angeles. The ship dimensions were specifically designed to fit through the Welland Canal. The ship has a straight bow, designed to reduce fuel consumption and improve stability. The ice-strengthened Polar Class 6 hull was built to ensure a safe voyage and state of the art U-tank stabilisers are intended to decrease rolling by up to 50% when the ship is stationary.

The Viking Octantis was primarily constructed at the Fincantieri Vard Tulcea shipyard in Romania, when it was towed to the Vard Søviknes shipyard in Søvik, Norway for interior outfitting and completion.

=== Design features ===
- "The Hangar": an aft ship bay that holds all the expedition equipment, including a fleet of zodiacs, kayaks, two high speed special operation boats with a 26-metre (85 ft) custom stern slipway, side bay doors with a gantry crane, and two Cruise Sub 7-300 yellow submarines named "John" and "George".
- "The Aula": an aft two deck high transformative auditorium space with glass windows on three sides, for educational presentations and lectures. It is inspired by the University of Oslo's ceremonial hall, the former venue for the Nobel Peace Prize ceremony, with replica drop murals.
- "The Laboratory": Lab space in coordination with NOAA - Great Lakes Environmental Research Laboratory, Cornell Lab of Ornithology, Norwegian Institute of Water Research(NIVA), Polar Citizen Science Collective, Norwegian Polar Institute, University of Cambridge, IUCN, Oceanites, and the Scott Polar Research Institute. The Viking Octantis is also partnered with the National Weather Service, and is the first civilian ship sanctioned to be a launch site for weather balloons.

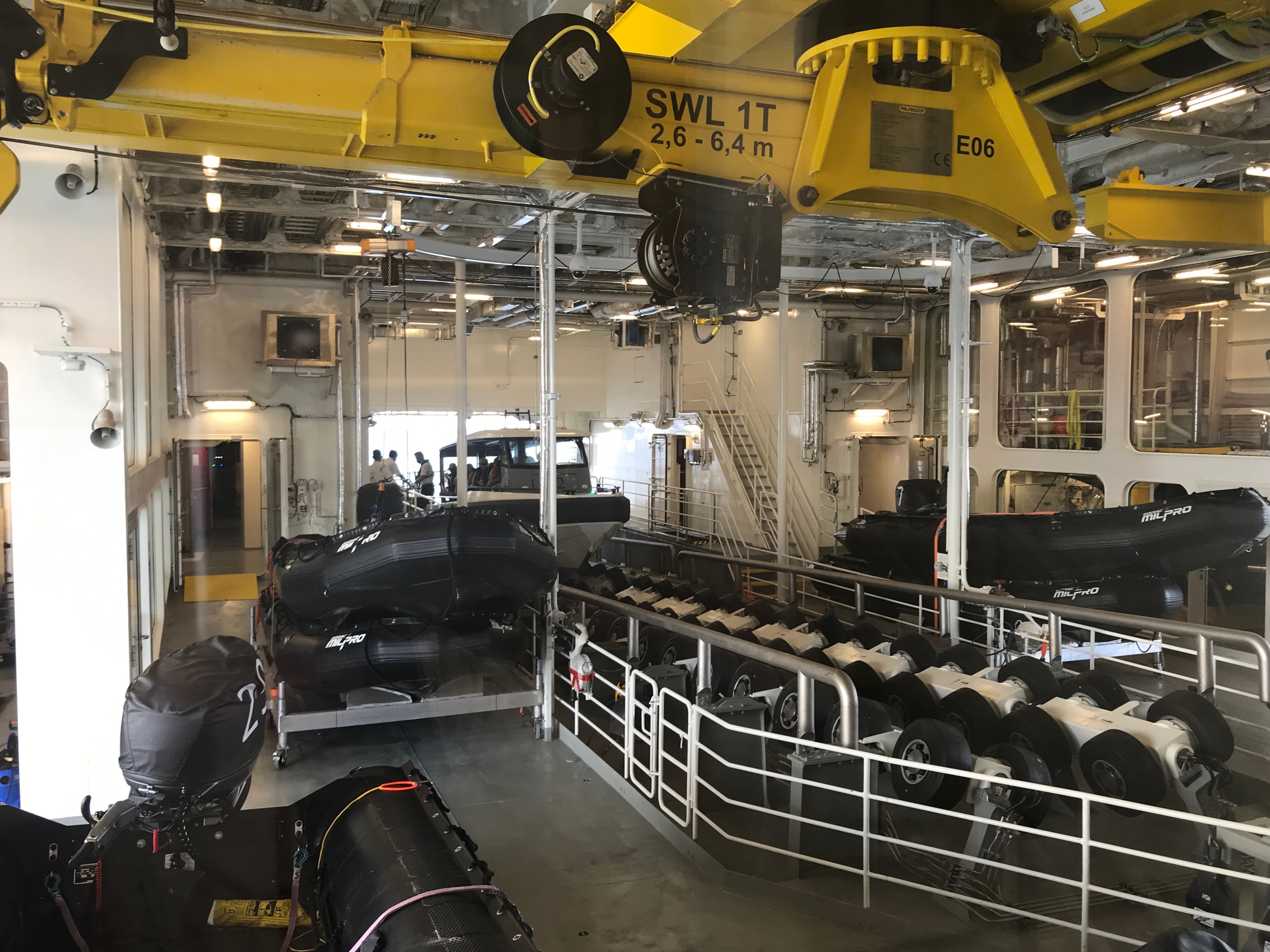
The Hangar for expedition equipment

== History ==
The Viking Octantis is Viking Cruises' first expedition ship; they took delivery of the ship on December 22, 2021. The ship's maiden season was in Antarctica with the first passenger voyage in January 2022. Explorer Liv Arnesen was named the ships's godmother. After the Antarctic season the ship sailed north via the Caribbean Sea to New York City, where it was originally intended to have the ship's official naming ceremony, but was postponed due to the Russian invasion of Ukraine. The ship departed New York City to begin her maiden Great Lakes season, sailing out of such ports as Toronto, Thunder Bay, and Milwaukee. The Viking Octantis was also the first cruise ship to return to Atlantic Canadian ports in over two years since restrictions were put in place, with her first port of call in Charlottetown, Prince Edward Island.

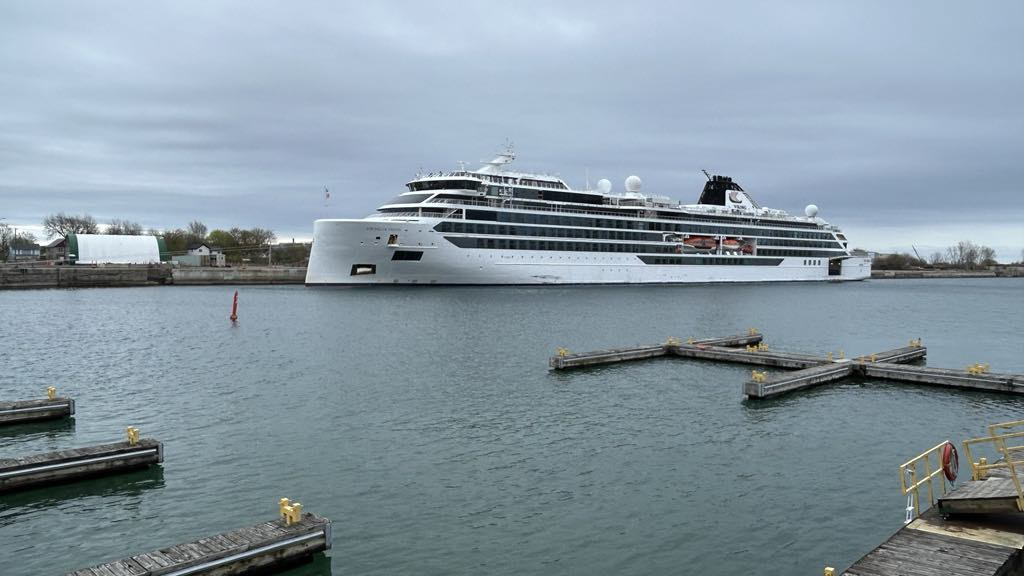
Viking Octantis is docked in Port Colborne on May 4, 2025

The ship was finally named on September 30, 2022, in Toronto, Canada, in a special virtual remote dual christening with her sister ship, Viking Polaris docked in Amsterdam. Liv Arnesen blessed the ship from the bow of the Viking Polaris in Amsterdam, while a crew member in Toronto released the bottle of champagne on the bow.

As of 2025, the Viking Octantis currently sails in the Arctic and Great Lakes in the northern hemisphere summer months before returning to Antarctic summer cruise season.
