= List of ship launches in 2024 =

This is a chronological list of some ships launched in 2024.

Date	Ship	Class / type	Builder	Location	Country	Notes
26 January	Arklow Grace		Ferus Smit	Westerbroek	Netherlands	For Arklow Shipping
25 February	Silver Ray	Nova-class cruise ship	Meyer Werft	Papenburg	Germany	For Silversea Cruises
March	Viking Hathor	River Cruise Ship			Egypt	For Viking Cruises
12 April	Arklow Guard		Ferus Smit	Westerbroek	Netherlands	For Arklow Shipping
April	MSC World America	World-class cruise ship	Chantiers de l'Atlantique	Saint-Nazaire	France	For MSC Cruises
April	Norwegian Aqua	Prima-Plus-class cruise ship	Fincantieri	Marghera	Italy	For Norwegian Cruise Line
3 May	Thun Reliance		Ferus Smit	Leer	Germany	For Thun Tankers
May	Viking Sokeb	River Cruise Ship			Egypt	For Viking Cruises
June	GNV Orion				China	
28 June	Lidan	Lake-Vanern-Max-series	Ferus Smit	Westerbroek	Netherlands	For Erik Thun
July	Viking Vesta	Venice-class cruise ship	Fincantieri	Ancona	Italy	For Viking Ocean Cruises
	Hetman Iwan Wyhowskyj	Ada-class corvette			Turkey	For Ukrainian Navy
3 August	Disney Treasure	Cruise Ship	Meyer Werft	Papenburg	Germany	For Disney Cruise Line
5 September	Luminara				France	
September	Star Princess	Sphere-class cruise ship	Fincantieri	Monfalcone	Italy	For Princess Cruises
3 October	Agamemnon	Astute-class submarine	BAE Systems Submarine Solutions	Barrow-in-Furness	United Kingdom	For Royal Navy.
25 October	Spiken	Lake-Vanern-Max-series	Ferus Smit	Westerbroek	Netherlands	For Erik Thun
Unknown date	Rachel Parsons	Electric boat	Alicat Workboats Ltd.	Great Yarmouth	United Kingdom	For North Star Renewables.
	ML Freyja	ferry	Cantiere Navale Visentini	Porto Viro	Italy	For Mann Lines
November	Star Seeker	Cruise ship			Portugal	For Windstar Cruises
