= MV Viking Sky =

Cruise ship operated by Viking Ocean Cruises

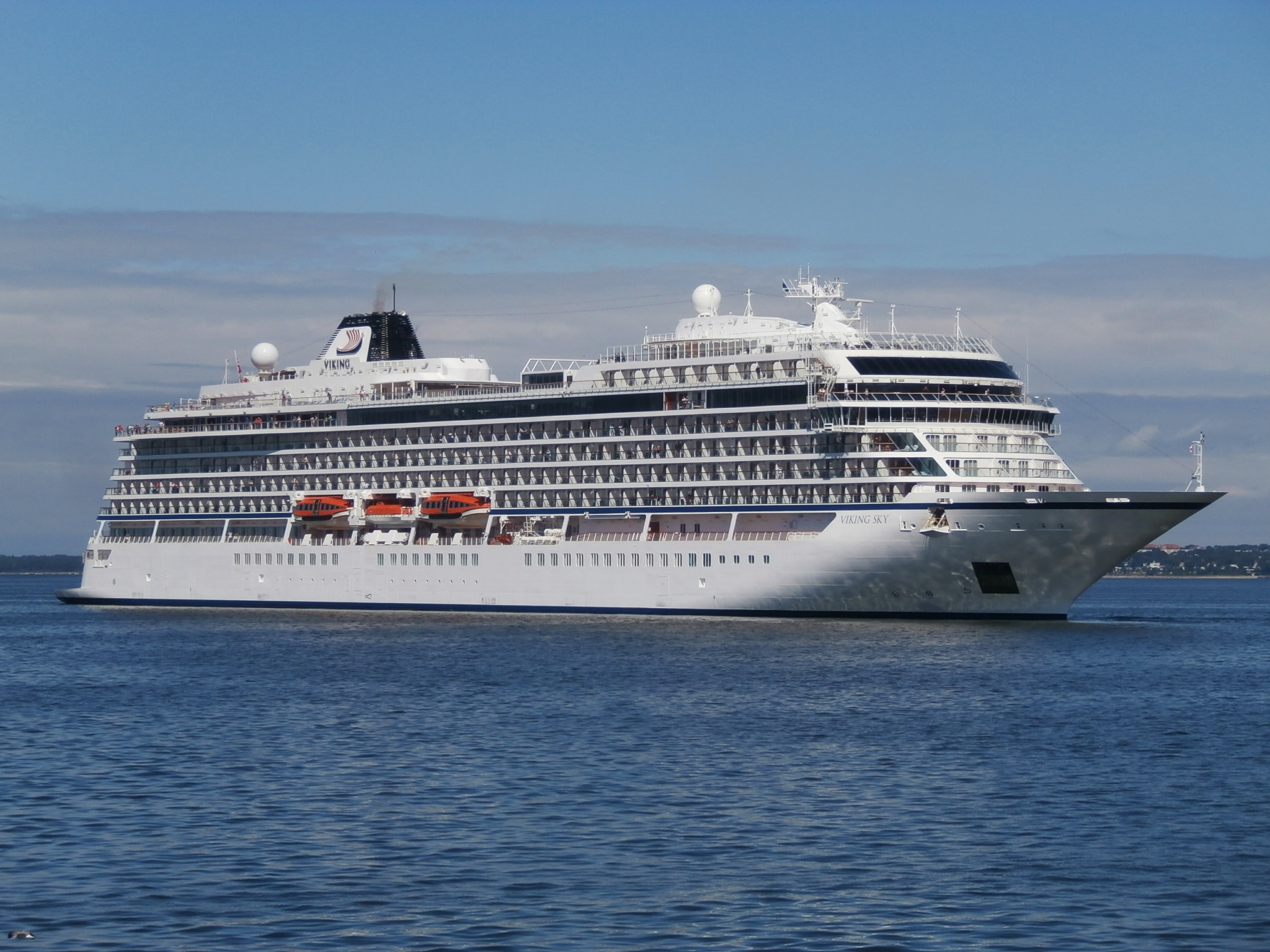
- Viking Sky departing Tallinn, Estonia on 24 July 2017

History

Norway
- Name: Viking Sky
- Namesake: Royal Viking Sky
- Owner: Viking Ocean Cruises
- Operator: Viking Ocean Cruises
- Port of registry: Bergen, Norway
- Route: Mediterranean & Adriatic; Trans Atlantic; Baltic; Norwegian Fjords
- Ordered: July 2012
- Builder: Fincantieri
- Cost: US$ 400 million
- Yard number: 6237
- Laid down: 20 December 2013
- Launched: 23 March 2016
- Christened: June 2017
- Completed: 26 January 2017
- Maiden voyage: 25 February 2017
- In service: 2017–present
- Identification: IMO number: 9650420; MMSI number: 259186000; Call sign: LAYU7
- Status: In service

General characteristics
- Type: Cruise ship
- Tonnage: 47,842 GT; 18,858 NT; 4,826 DWT
- Length: 228.2 m (748 ft 8 in)
- Beam: 28.8 m (94 ft 6 in)
- Draught: 6.45 m (21 ft 2 in)
- Decks: 14
- Ice class: 1C
- Installed power: 2 × MAN 9L32/44CR (2 × 5,040 kW); 2 × MAN 12V32/44CR (2 × 6,720 kW)
- Propulsion: Diesel-electric, two shafts (2 × 7,250 kW)
- Speed: 17 knots (31 km/h; 20 mph) (service); 20 knots (37 km/h; 23 mph) (maximum)
- Capacity: 930 passengers in 465 cabins
- Crew: 550

MV Viking Sky is a cruise ship launched in 2016, operated by Viking Ocean Cruises since 2017. On 23 March 2019, she suffered an engine failure off the coast of Norway, with a partial evacuation by helicopters.

== General characteristics ==
Viking Sky is 228.2 metres (748 ft 8 in) long overall, has a moulded beam of 28.8 metres (94 ft 6 in) and draws 6.45 metres (21 ft 2 in) of water at design draught. Her gross tonnage is 47,842, net tonnage 18,858, and deadweight tonnage 4,826 tonnes. The ship's hull is strengthened for navigation in ice with Finnish-Swedish ice class 1C.

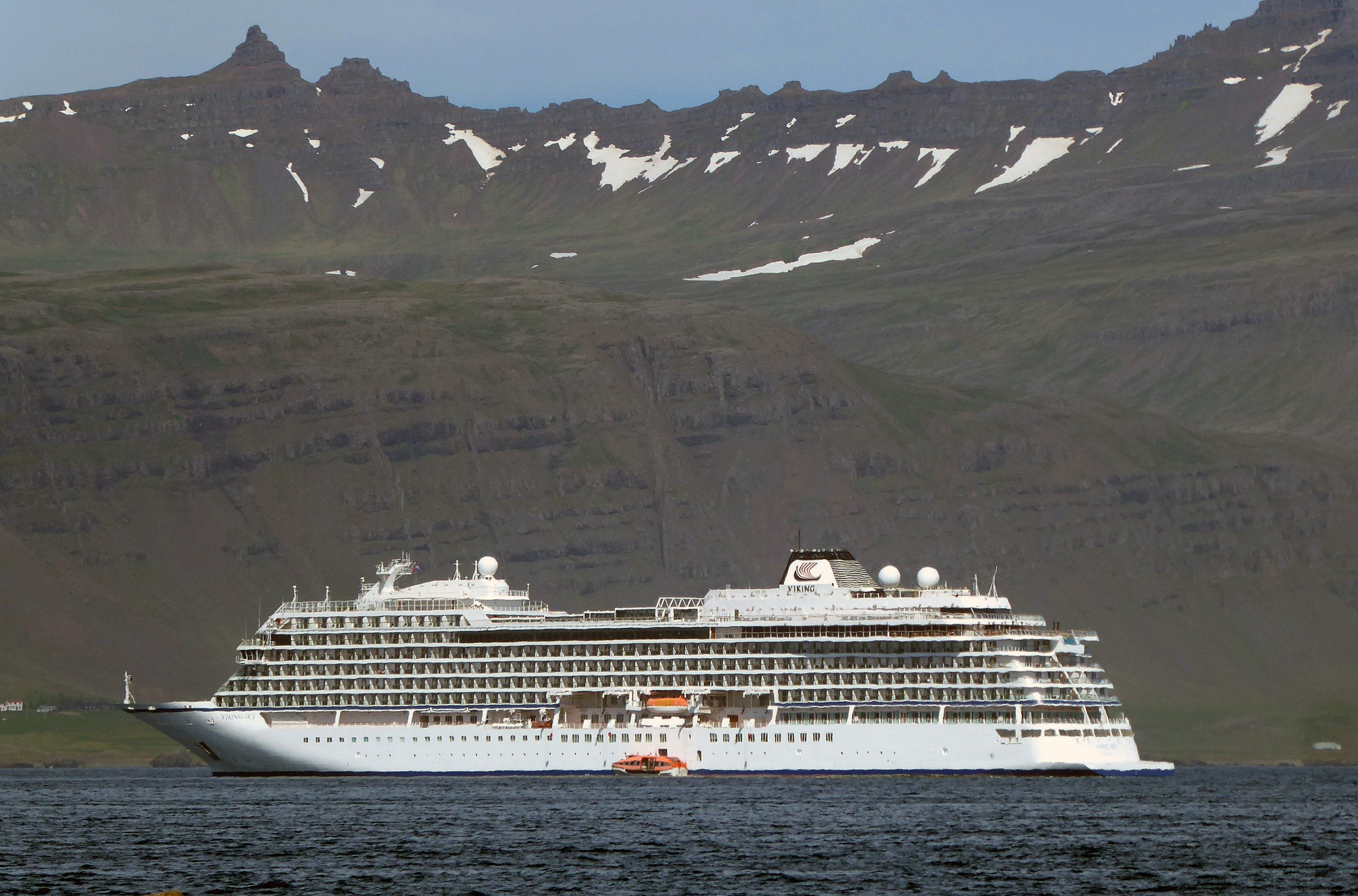
Viking Sky 2021 in Iceland

Viking Sky has 465 cabins for passengers, all outside with balconies. Amenities include two pools, a spa, a fitness center, two restaurants, several lounges and bars, a sports deck, a theatre, and various shops.

Like most modern cruise ships, Viking Sky has a diesel-electric propulsion system where an integrated power plant provides electricity for all onboard consumers ranging from the vessel's twin propellers to hotel functions such as lighting, air conditioning and electrical sockets in the passenger cabins. Her two interconnected but physically separated high-voltage switchboards are supplied by four alternators driven by MAN 32/44CR series medium-speed diesel engines.

In accordance with the Safe Return to Port requirements for passenger ships, the power plant is split to two engine rooms separated by watertight and fireproof bulkheads. Each engine room houses one 9-cylinder 9L32/44CR engine rated at 5,040 kW (6,760 hp) and one 12-cylinder 12V32/44CR engine producing 6,720 kW (9,010 hp) each, a so-called "father and son" configuration. In addition, Viking Sky has a single 1,390 kW (1,860 hp) Isotta Fraschini V1712T3 emergency diesel generator.

For propulsion, electricity from the main switchboards is fed through propulsion transformers and pulse-width modulated variable-frequency drives to two 7,250-kilowatt (9,720 hp) asynchronous electric motors, each driving a six-bladed fixed variable-pitch propellers with a diameter of 4.5 metres (15 ft). This propulsion system gives Viking Sky a service speed of 17 knots (31 km/h; 20 mph) and maximum speed of 20 knots (37 km/h; 23 mph). The ship's twin rudders feature Rolls-Royce's Promas system with streamlined propeller hubcaps and rudders that improve hydrodynamic performance. In addition, she has two 2,800 kW (3,800 hp) bow thrusters and a single 1,400 kW (1,900 hp) stern thruster for manoeuvering in ports.

== Career ==
=== Construction ===
Viking Sky is one of a series of cruise ships built by Fincantieri in Ancona, Italy, for Viking Ocean Cruises. As of 2019, she has five sister ships in operation (Viking Star, Viking Sea, Viking Sun, Viking Orion and Viking Jupiter), one under construction (Viking Venus), five on order (Viking Tellus and four yet unnamed vessels) and four more planned with deliveries spanning to 2027. Viking Sky was laid down on 20 December 2013, launched on 23 March 2016, and delivered on 26 January 2017. The ship was originally planned to set sail in 2016 as Viking Sea, but delivery was delayed until 2017. She was christened in June 2017 at Tromsø. Her port of registry is Bergen.

=== 2019 incident ===
Timeline for 2019 MV Viking Sky incident
23 March 2019
- 13:45: Passes as planned through a 50 m (164 ft) deep section between reefs of 12–20 m (39–66 ft) underwater
- 13:50: All engines shut down, speed 1.4 kn (2.6 km/h; 1.6 mph)
- 14:00: Mayday reported, speed 5.9 kn (10.9 km/h; 6.8 mph) adrift southeast towards land
- 14:05: Both anchors dropped, speed 9.4 kn (17.4 km/h; 10.8 mph)
- 14:36: Anchors catch bottom, a few hundred meters from shallow reefs
- 15:00: Order to evacuate. Speed 0.8 kn (1.5 km/h; 0.9 mph) away from shore
- 14:44 or 15:30: First engine restarted, speed 5.1 kn (9.4 km/h; 5.9 mph) away from shore
- 14:30 or 16: Evacuation starts, using 4–5 helicopters
- 16:30: 87 people put on shore
- 19:00: Freighter Hagland Captain loses engine power, two helicopters diverted and rescues all 9 in water
- night, 24 March: Three engines working
- morning: 300 people evacuated
- 08:00: Tugboats (Ocean Response and Vivax) attached to Viking Sky
- 9:10: Evacuation stopped at 460 passengers, ship is being towed to Molde
- 15:11: Mayday ended
- 16:20: Viking Sky arrives at Molde with 436 passengers and 458 crew

On 23 March 2019, the cruise ship was en route southwest from Tromsø to Stavanger in Norway in strong winds and rough seas with 15-meter (49 ft) high waves. According to pilot(s) on board, the weather was well within the operational capability of the ship. There were 1,373 people on board – 915 passengers and 458 crew.

Around 13:50 in Hustadvika off the coast between Molde and Kristiansund, the ship's engines suffered loss of oil pressure, triggering an automatic shutdown of all engines — which can only run without lubricant at most for several few minutes without incurring major damage. With the ship drifting toward land, the ship's lubricant alarms failed to engage. Rescue boats were dispatched but returned due to the rough conditions. The ship dropped anchors, while tugboats attempted unsuccessfully to attach towlines.

Six rescue helicopters were sent to the scene; pairs of helicopters operated simultaneously, hoisting passengers from the bow and stern of the ship. The crew of Viking Sky managed to restart one engine, but evacuation continued. "The ship only has one working engine and the winds are rather strong. Therefore we would prefer to have the passengers on land rather than on board the ship," police chief Tor Andre Franck said.

After about five hours, 100 passengers had been evacuated, with at least four helicopters involved in the airlift. "It will take time to evacuate everyone," Franck said. The incident occurred mid-afternoon 1.1 nautical miles (2 km) off the Møre og Romsdal area of western Norway. One expert said that the ship had been around 100 metres (330 ft) from grounding.

Around 19:00, two helicopters were diverted to rescue the crew of the cargo ship Hagland Captain, which had been going to the aid of Viking Sky and also suffered an engine failure. The Hagland crew bailed into the sea and were picked up by helicopters in the dark.

Sky's anchors were released (one pulled on board, one left behind) to move the ship further offshore. The concentration of Norwegian helicopters in the Hustadvika area caused rescue responsibility for Skagerrak to be transferred to Denmark and Sweden, and a Danish rescue helicopter was repositioned to Kristiansand in South Norway. Great Britain was ready to supply assistance if needed.

At 00:00 local time, roughly 170 passengers had been evacuated by helicopter. The ship was moving heavily in the storm with furniture sliding back and forth. On 24 March, after three of the four engines had been restarted during the night, evacuation was stopped at 9 Sunday morning, and Viking Sky got under way and headed for Molde. During the 30 helicopter trips, 479 people had been airlifted off the ship. Of the people on board, 16 had been taken to hospital; three of them suffering serious injuries.

Viking Sky went to Molde under her own power but attached to a tug, as Sky's anchors were no longer operable, and reached Molde at 16:30 on 24 March. On 27 March, she arrived at a shipyard in Kristiansund for repairs, and its next cruise was cancelled.

The Accident Investigation Board Norway opened an investigation, including why the ship sailed despite storm warnings having been issued, with the corresponding agencies of the United Kingdom and United States participating. Norwegian police conducted a separate inquiry which included both Lloyd's Register of Shipping and the engine makers. On 27 March, a safety message was issued asking operators to check their lubricating oil systems, stating that the reason for the engine failure was that the lubricating oil pumps stopped running due to boat movement which caused problems with oil flow.

In 2024, media reported on contents in the report from the Accident Investigation Board; the report said that the ship should not have left Tromsø while the ship had technical problems.
