= MV Viking Star =

Cruise ship

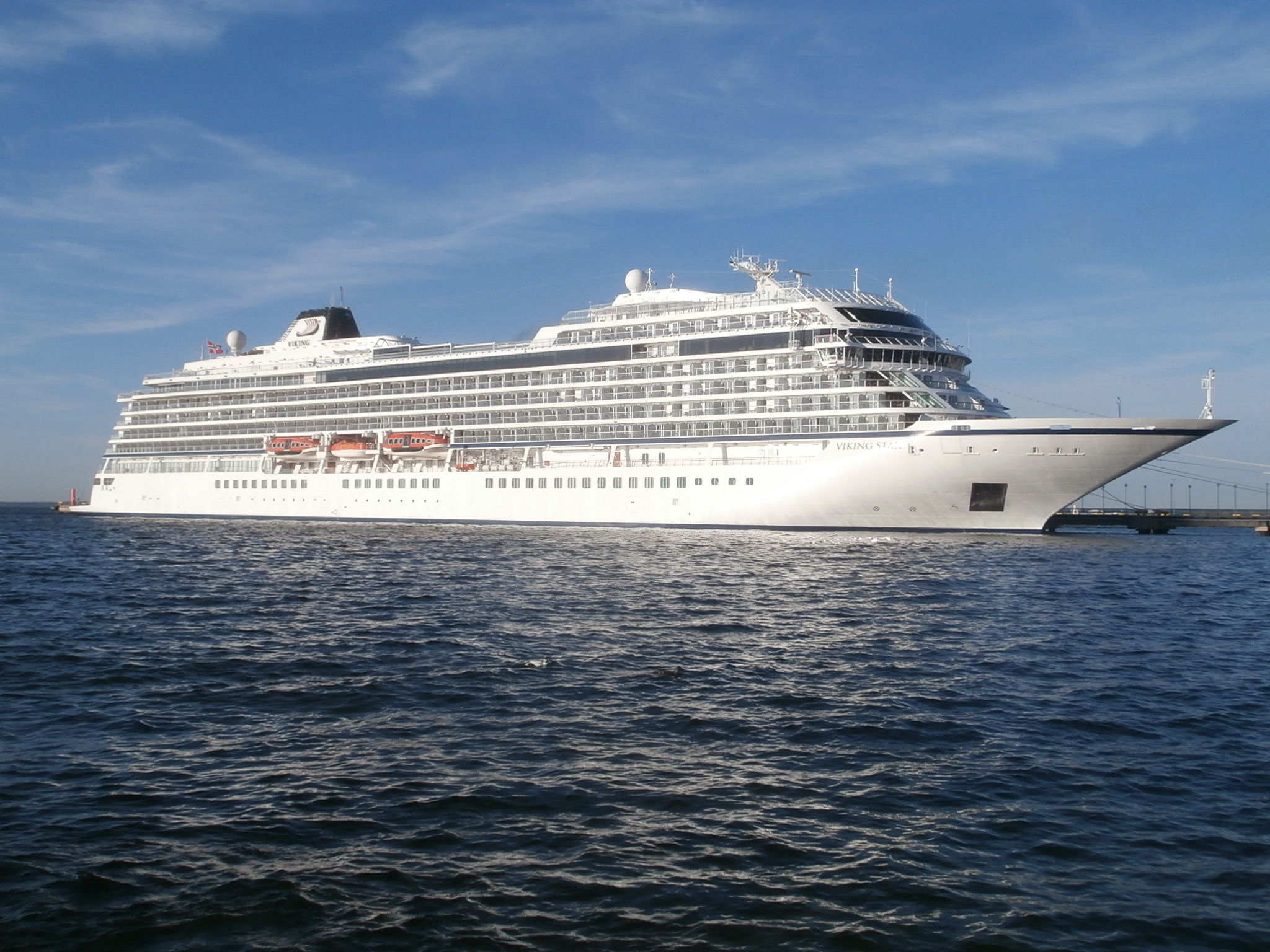
- Viking Star departing Tallinn, Estonia in May 2016

History
- Name: Viking Star
- Namesake: Royal Viking Star
- Owner: Viking Ocean Cruises
- Operator: Viking Ocean Cruises
- Port of registry: Bergen, Norway
- Ordered: July 2012
- Builder: Fincantieri, Marghera, Italy
- Yard number: 6236
- Laid down: 18 December 2013
- Launched: 23 June 2014
- Sponsored by: Trude Drevland
- Christened: 17 May 2015
- Completed: 2015
- Acquired: 28 March 2015
- In service: 11 April 2015
- Identification: IMO number: 9650418; MMSI number: 257903000; Call sign LAIW6
- Status: In service

General characteristics
- Type: Cruise ship
- Tonnage: 47,842 GT; 4,912 DWT
- Length: 228 m (748 ft 0 in)
- Beam: 29 m (95 ft 2 in)
- Height: 44 m (144 ft 4 in)
- Draught: 6.3 m (20 ft 8 in)
- Decks: 14
- Ice class: 1C
- Installed power: 2 × MAN 9L32/44CR (2 × 5,040 kW); 2 × MAN 12V32/44CR (2 × 6,720 kW)
- Propulsion: Diesel-electric, two shafts (2 × 7,250 kW)
- Speed: 17 knots (31 km/h; 20 mph) (service); 20 knots (37 km/h; 23 mph) (maximum)
- Capacity: 930 passengers
- Crew: 602

Viking Star is the lead ship of the Viking Star class of cruise ships, and the first such ship operated by Viking Ocean Cruises, a division of Viking Cruises. She entered service in April 2015. Two Viking Star-class sister ships, Viking Sea and Viking Sky, joined her in the Viking Ocean Cruises fleet in 2016.

== Concept and construction ==
Viking Star was designed by SMC Design of London with exterior styling by Clifford Denn Design, while Rottet Studio in Los Angeles was engaged to design her interior. The vessel's modern Scandinavian design ties in with that of Viking Cruises' river cruisers, and was intended to mix onboard elegance with a focus on destinations. As a relatively small vessel, Viking Star is able to access most ports directly, and thus facilitate efficient and trouble-free embarkation and debarkation processes. She also has a hydro-dynamically optimised streamlined hull and bow for maximum fuel efficiency.

The ship's first plate was cut on 7 June 2013 at the Fincantieri Marghera shipyard in Marghera, Italy. The plate cutting ceremony was attended, among others, by Torstein Hagen, founder and chairman of Viking. The keel was laid on 18 December 2013. Fincantieri launched Viking Star on 23 June 2014, about 20 days earlier than the previously announced launch date in mid-July.

In mid-December 2014, the ship successfully completed a week long period of sea trials in the Aegean Sea, during which she underwent more than 80 different tests. A variety of functions and systems were evaluated, including engine and propulsion performance, the navigation systems, and cabin acoustics.

Viking Ocean Cruises took delivery of Viking Star at the shipyard on 28 March 2015.

== Architecture and equipment ==
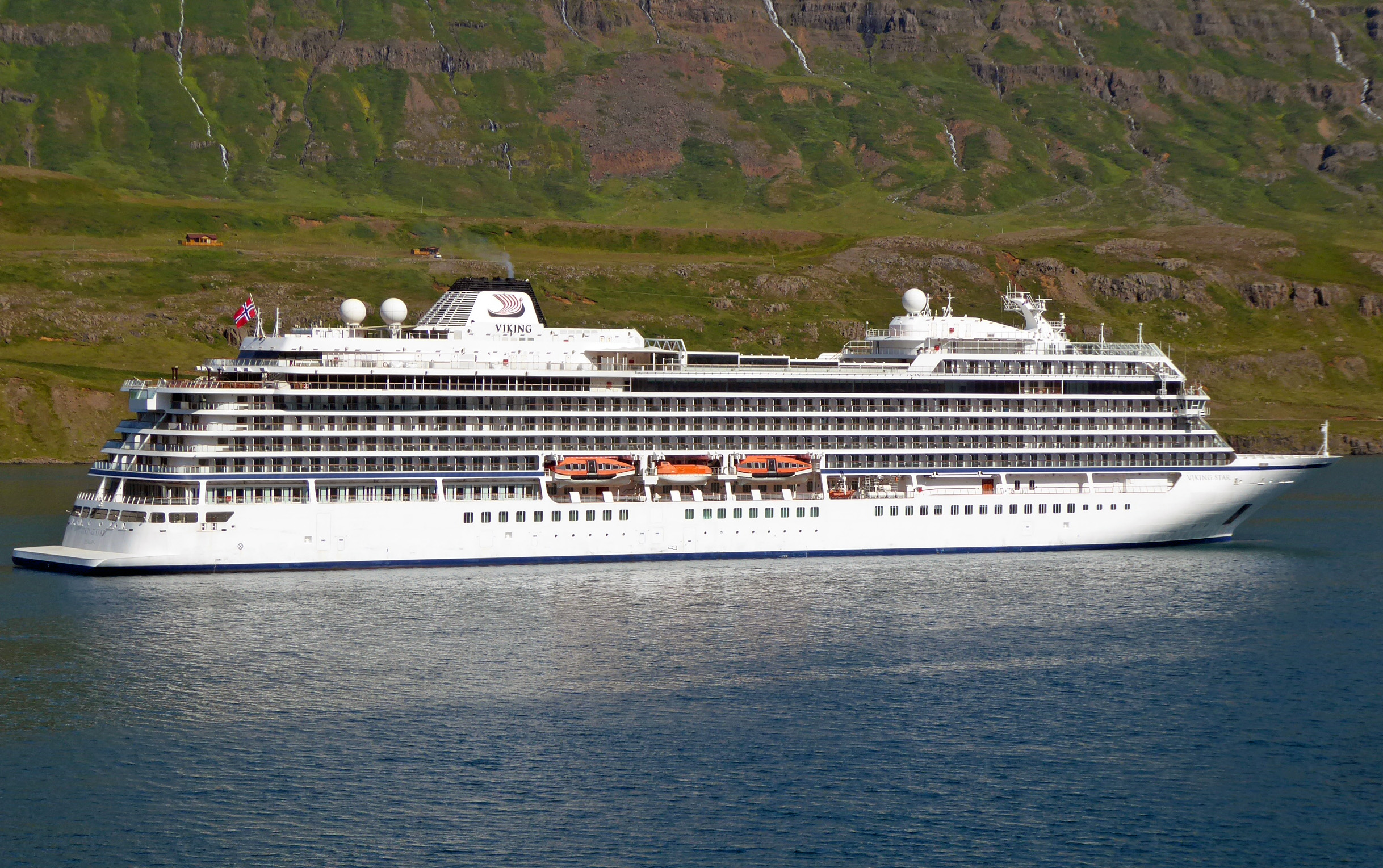
Stern view of Viking Star in 2021

=== Public areas ===
On board, Viking Star features two pools, the main pool and the Infinity Pool, a spa and a fitness center. She also has three restaurants, lounges, the piano lounge and the explorers lounge, the wintergarden, the aquavit terrace and the world cafe. Also, Viking Star has a sports deck, the star theatre and bar, the lobby bar and various shops.

=== Accommodation ===
Viking Star has five stateroom categories, all with private verandas, and 14 Explorer Suites. Up to 930 passengers can be accommodated in her 465 staterooms and suites, all of which are spacious for a cruise ship. The smallest staterooms are 25 m^{2} (270 sq ft) in size; the two-room suites range from 70.3 m^{2} (757 sq ft) to 134.5 m^{2} (1,448 sq ft) in area, and feature wrap-around private balconies offering sweeping views.

=== Machinery ===
The vessel is fitted with energy-efficient hybrid engines, and onboard solar panels and exhaust pollution-minimising equipment to enable her to meet strict environmental regulations. Her COMPAC propeller shaft bearings, manufactured by Thordon Bearings, are lubricated by seawater, which is recycled into the ocean. The use of seawater as a lubricant lowers in-service maintenance costs, by eliminating the requirement for an aft seal. The seawater lubricant also replaces expensive biodegradable oils, which, if used, would need to be stored, sampled and disposed of, and would also create a risk of accidental oil discharge.

=== Entertainment facilities ===
The theatre features live entertainment, as well as new-release films and some old favourites. Additionally, there are port talks and lectures from the on-board cultural enrichment programmes on art, history and culture. The lecture programme includes academic lecturers, local speakers and interactive demonstrations.

== Commercial service ==
=== Cape Cod Canal Railroad Bridge ===
On 12 October 2016, a mast on Viking Star clipped the underside of the Cape Cod Canal Railroad Bridge. Subsequent inspection of the bridge indicated no damage, other than scraped paint.
