= Viking Vesta =

Viking Cruise ship

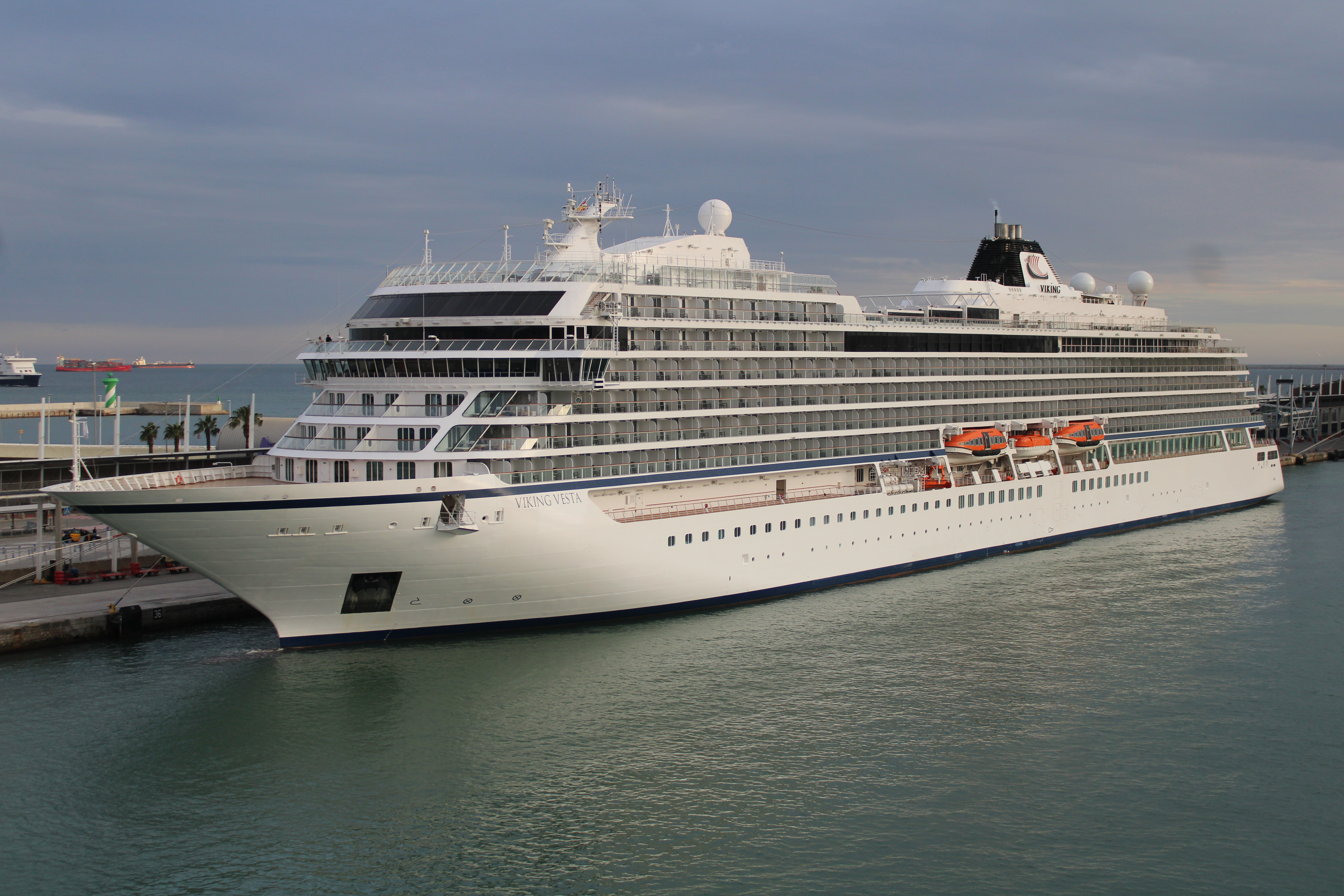
- Viking Vesta in Barcelona, Spain on 28 March 2026

History

Norway
- Name: Viking Vesta
- Operator: Viking Ocean Cruises
- Port of registry: Bergen, Norway
- Ordered: 2022
- Builder: Fincantieri (Ancona, Italy)
- Cost: US$ 446 million
- Yard number: 6318
- Laid down: 20 October 2023
- Launched: July 2024
- Completed: 30 June 2025
- Maiden voyage: 2 July 2025
- In service: 2025–present
- Identification: IMO number: 9852444; MMSI number: 257944000; Call sign: LAUR8
- Status: In service

General characteristics
- Type: Cruise ship
- Tonnage: 53,769 GT; 21,501 NT; 6,103 DWT
- Length: 228 m (748 ft 0 in)
- Beam: 28.8 m (94 ft 6 in)
- Draught: 6.67 m (21 ft 11 in)
- Decks: 14
- Ice class: 1C
- Installed power: 2 × MAN 9L32/44CR (2 × 5,040 kW); 2 × MAN 12V32/44CR (2 × 6,720 kW)
- Propulsion: Diesel-electric with 4.7 MWh battery capacity; two azimuth thrusters
- Speed: 20 knots (37 km/h; 23 mph) (maximum)
- Capacity: 998 passengers in 499 cabins
- Crew: 550

Viking Vesta is a cruise ship that was launched in 2024, christened in June 2025 and entered service in July 2025. She is operated by Viking Ocean Cruises.

== General characteristics ==
Viking Vesta is 784 ft (239 m) long overall, has a moulded beam of 101 ft (31 m) and draws 21 ft 2 in (6.45 m) of water at design draught. Her gross tonnage is 48,000, The ship's hull is strengthened for navigation in ice with Finnish-Swedish ice class 1C.

Viking Vesta has 499 cabins for 998 passengers, all outside with balconies. Amenities include two pools, a spa, a fitness center, two restaurants, several lounges and bars, a sports deck, a theatre, and various shops.

Like most modern cruise ships, Viking Vesta has a diesel-electric propulsion system where an integrated power plant provides electricity for all onboard consumers ranging from the vessel's twin propellers to hotel functions such as lighting, air conditioning and electrical sockets in the passenger cabins. The ship is also designed to ultimately use hydrogen as fuel. Her two interconnected but physically separated high-voltage switchboards are supplied by four alternators driven by MAN 32/44CR series medium-speed diesel engines. Viking Vesta is a sister ship to Viking Libra, the first hydrogen powered cruise ship. Both have 4.7 MWh battery capacity.

In accordance with the Safe Return to Port requirements for passenger ships, the power plant is split to two engine rooms separated by watertight and fireproof bulkheads. Each engine room houses one 9-cylinder 9L32/44CR engine rated at 5,040 kW (6,760 hp) and one 12-cylinder 12V32/44CR engine producing 6,720 kW (9,010 hp) each, a so-called "father and son" configuration.

For propulsion, Viking Vesta is equipped with two azimuth thrusters, which allow for 360-degree rotation for enhanced maneuverability. This propulsion system gives Viking Vesta a service speed of 15 knots (28 km/h; 17 mph) and maximum speed of 20 knots (37 km/h; 23 mph). In addition, she has two 2,800 kW (3,800 hp) bow thrusters for maneuvering in ports.

== Career ==
=== Construction ===
Viking Vesta is one of a series of cruise ships built by Fincantieri in Ancona, Italy, for Viking Ocean Cruises. As of 2025, as second in her class, she has one sister ship in operation (Viking Vela), with others under construction or on order. Viking Vesta was laid down in 2024, launched in July 2024, and delivered on 30 June 2025.

=== Maiden voyage ===
Viking Vesta's maiden voyage departed Venice, Italy, on 2 July 2025 for a 12-night journey in the Mediterranean Sea to Barcelona, Spain, with port stops in Italy, Croatia, Greece, Monaco, and France.

=== Planned itineraries ===
Viking Vesta is planned to sail in the Mediterranean and to destinations in Northern Europe.
