= MV Viking Sea =

Two ships have been named Viking Sea :

- MV Viking Sea (2012), a vehicle carrier launched in 2012
- MV Viking Sea (2015), a cruise ship launched in 2015

== See also ==
- Royal Viking Sea, a cruise ship launched in 1973
