= Viking Orion =

Cruise ship

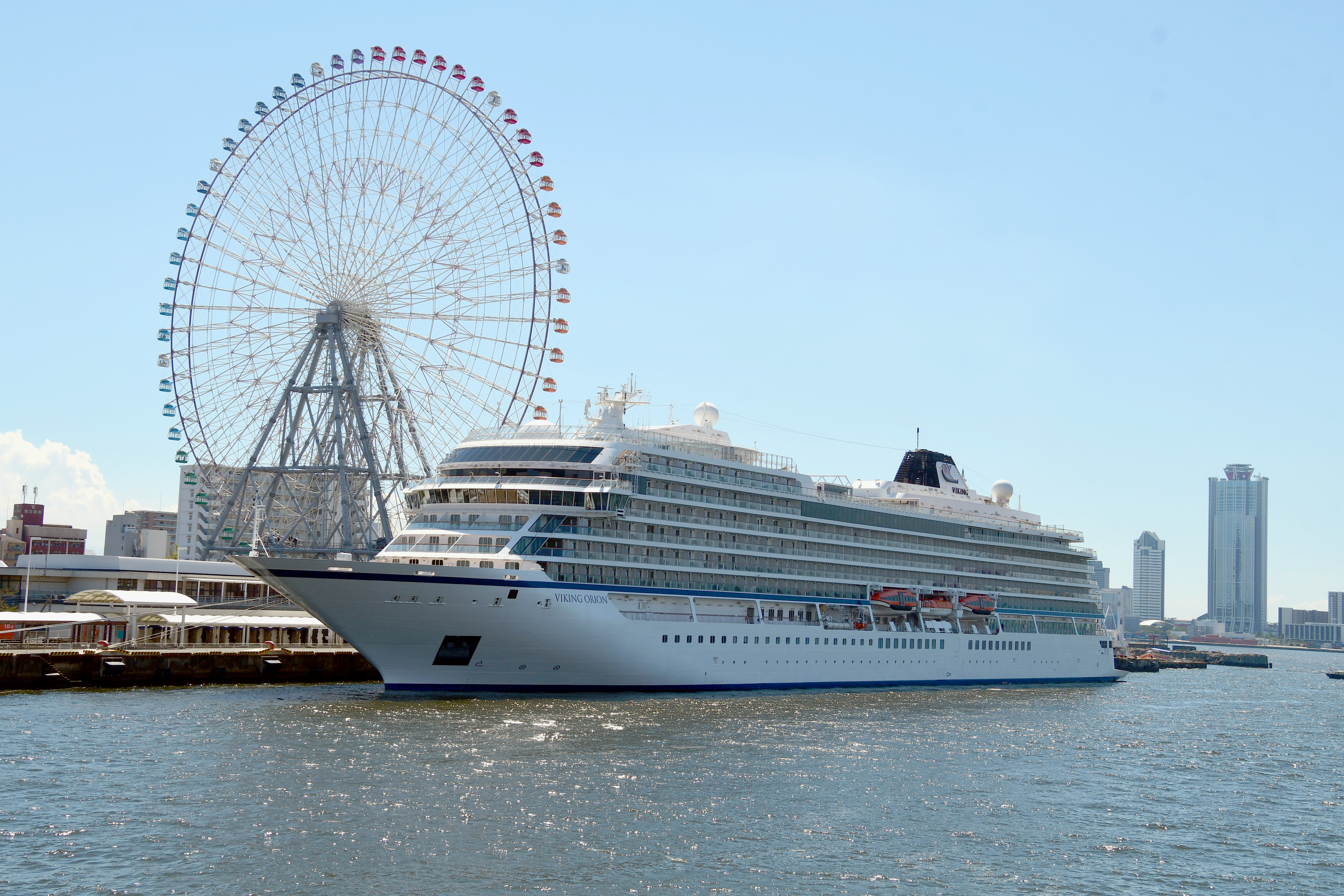
- Viking Orion in Osaka, Japan

History

Norway
- Name: Viking Orion
- Operator: Viking Ocean Cruises
- Port of registry: Bergen, Norway
- Builder: Fincantieri
- Yard number: 6253
- Launched: September 2017
- Christened: 14 June 2018
- Completed: 2018
- Maiden voyage: 14 June 2018
- In service: 2018–present
- Identification: IMO number: 9796250; MMSI number: 257034130; Call sign: LAYQ7

General characteristics
- Type: Cruise ship
- Tonnage: 47,842 GT; 18,858 NT; 4,826 DWT
- Length: 228.2 m (748 ft 8 in)
- Beam: 28.8 m (94 ft 6 in)
- Draught: 6.45 m (21 ft 2 in)
- Decks: 14
- Ice class: 1C
- Propulsion: Propulsion Electric Motors 2 x 7250 kW
- Speed: 17 knots (31 km/h; 20 mph) (service); 20 knots (37 km/h; 23 mph) (maximum)
- Capacity: 930
- Crew: 550

Viking Orion is a cruise ship operated by Viking Ocean Cruises. The ship was built by Fincantieri at its yard in Ancona, Italy. It was delivered to Viking Cruises on 7 June 2018. The ship was christened by NASA astronaut Anna Fisher in a ceremony at Livorno, Italy. The ship was named after Orion the Hunter, a constellation and has the unique feature of a planetarium.

== History ==
Viking Orion was floated out in September 2017. The ship's maiden voyage was a shakedown cruise (not open to the public) which departed from Rome, Italy and ended in Barcelona, Spain. The first commercial voyage departed Barcelona on 19 June 2018.

On 1 January 2023, the ship was asked to leave New Zealand waters due to excess algae and barnacles. The ship was subsequently prohibited from docking in Adelaide, Australia due to the same issues, causing passengers to be stranded on board. Four port stops were missed. The cruise line hired divers to clean the hull whilst it was in international waters.
