= MV Viking Sea (2015) =

Cruise ship

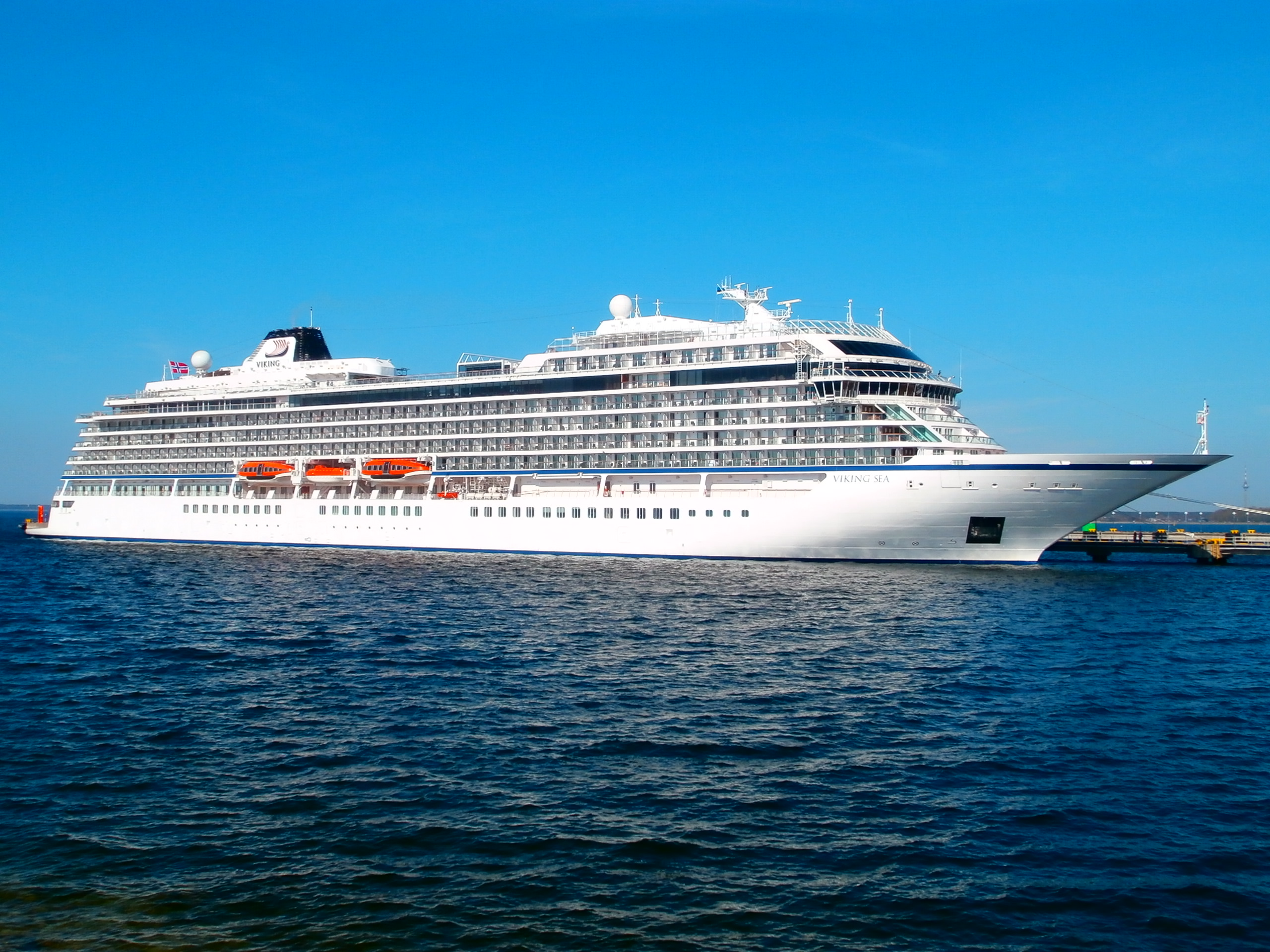
- Viking Sea in the Port of Tallinn, Estonia on May 19, 2017.

History
- Name: Viking Sea
- Namesake: Royal Viking Sea
- Owner: Torstein Hagen
- Operator: Viking Ocean Cruises
- Port of registry: Bergen, Norway
- Ordered: December 2012
- Builder: Fincantieri
- Yard number: 6245
- Laid down: 6 November 2014
- Launched: 25 June 2015
- Christened: 5 May 2016 by Karine Hagen
- Acquired: 24 March 2016
- Maiden voyage: 3 April 2016
- In service: 2016
- Identification: IMO number: 9725421; MMSI number: 258215000; Call sign: LAWP7
- Status: In service

General characteristics
- Type: Cruise ship
- Tonnage: 47,842 GT; 4,870 DWT
- Length: 227.20 m (745.4 ft)
- Beam: 28.80 m (94.5 ft)
- Draught: 6.30 m (20.7 ft)
- Decks: 10
- Installed power: 2 × MAN 9L32/44CR (2 × 5,040 kW); 2 × MAN 12V32/44CR (2 × 6,720 kW)
- Propulsion: Diesel-electric, two shafts (2 × 7,250 kW)
- Speed: 17 knots (31 km/h; 20 mph) (service); 20 knots (37 km/h; 23 mph) (maximum)
- Capacity: 930 passengers
- Crew: 550

MV Viking Sea is a cruise ship built by Italian shipbuilders Fincantieri for Viking Ocean Cruises. It is the second ship to grace the name Viking Sea, the first being Viking Sky which was originally assigned this name.

Viking Sea sailed from Venice to New Capital Quay on the River Thames at Greenwich, London, England, where on 5 May 2016 she became the largest vessel named in London. Viking Sea has 3 sister ships, Viking Star, Viking Sky and Viking Sun.

== Facilities ==
Viking Sea has passenger accommodations, three swimming pools, a spa, a fitness center, four restaurants and a café, lounges, a winter garden, a terrace, a sports deck, theatre and bars, and shops.

== Accidents and incidents ==
In August 2016, Viking Sea lost power in Malta.
