= Viking (cruise line) =

Swiss cruise line

- Type: Public
- Traded as: NYSE: VIK
- Industry: Travel and tourism
- Founded: 5 August 1997; 29 years ago
- Headquarters: Hamilton, Bermuda
- Key people: Torstein Hagen, Founder, Executive Chairman; Leah Talactac, Chief Executive Officer
- Products: River cruises; Ocean cruises; Expedition cruises
- Revenue: $5.3 billion (2024)
- Number of employees: 10,000+ (2023)
- Subsidiaries: Viking River Cruises; Viking Ocean Cruises; Viking Expeditions
- Website: www.viking.com

Viking (formerly Viking Cruises) is a cruise line providing river, ocean, and expedition cruises. Its operating headquarters are in Basel, Switzerland, and its marketing headquarters are in Los Angeles, California.

The company has three divisions, Viking River Cruises, Viking Ocean Cruises, and Viking Expeditions, offering cruises along the rivers and oceans of North and South America, the Caribbean, Antarctica, Great Lakes, Europe, Russia, Egypt, China, and Southeast Asia.

== History ==
=== Development ===
The company was established by Torstein Hagen in St. Petersburg, Russia as Viking River Cruises in 1997. Hagen had become involved in cruising as a McKinsey and Company consultant who helped the Holland America Line survive the 1973 oil crisis, then was CEO of the Royal Viking Line from 1980 to 1984, made money in the Russian private equity markets, then bought a controlling stake in a Dutch shipping company that failed in the mid-1990s, leaving him almost bankrupt. In 1997, Hagen helped some Russian oligarchs buy a shipping company, and in exchange, they sold him four river cruise ships cheaply, which became the founding fleet of Viking River Cruises.

=== 1997–2010: Rapid expansion ===
In 2000, Viking purchased KD River Cruises of Europe, which brought Viking's fleet total to 26, making it the largest river cruising fleet in the world. The company revamped the ships, aiming for its target demographic of older travelers. The lack of frills, like gyms and pools, and the fleet's standardization also maximized the number of people the ships could accommodate and consequently, Viking's profit. The same year, the company partnered with sales agents in the UK and the US, and opened its own sales office in California; led by Rudi Schreiner, who opened Viking's U.S. headquarters and served as president of its U.S. operation before co-founding AmaWaterways in 2002. It hired its first marketing firm the next year, focusing on English language speakers over 55, especially Americans. The company expanded into China in 2004 with Yangtze River cruises. By 2007, it was operating 23 ships in Europe, Russia, and China. In 2009, Viking started to use ships with hybrid diesel-electric engines that the company claims use an estimated 20% less fuel than conventional engines.

=== 2011–2019: Growth and modernization ===
In 2011, the company planned a new phase of growth, started sponsoring PBS's Masterpiece Theatre, and made plans to add 40 ships of a new "longship" design to its fleet over a five-year period. The longship design maximized passenger capacity by squaring the bow and rearranging hallways. It christened 10 ships in one day in 2013, and the 16 ships it christened over two days in 2014 made the Guinness Book of World Records. By 2013, the company had spent around $400 million in marketing through direct mailing, television, the web, and trade marketing. In May 2013, the company modified its name from Viking River Cruises to Viking Cruises as it announced the launch of Viking Ocean Cruises, a division of small, oceangoing vessels.

In October 2017, Viking Cruises revealed it was working on a project to develop the world's first cruise ship powered by liquid hydrogen. Once developed, the ship would measure approximately 230 m (750 ft) long and accommodate 900 passengers and 500 crew members. The ship would share a similar design to the company's existing oceangoing vessels.

By 2018, Viking Cruises had reached $3 billion in revenue and carried 440,000 passengers annually, employing more than 8,000 employees. That year, Viking Cruises announced it was working on its debut in the North American river cruising market after first suggesting the possibility in 2013. The company targeted a possible 2021 debut on the Mississippi River, for a projection of six vessels along the river by 2027. The vessels, built and chartered by Edison Chouest, would be designed five stories tall and accommodate around 400 passengers, at $90 million to $100 million each. Cruises would travel between New Orleans and Memphis, and between St. Louis and Saint Paul.

=== 2020–present: Rebranding and new ventures ===
In January 2020, the company shortened its name to Viking, citing the brand's added emphasis on destination-oriented enrichment and experiences. That same year, Viking also announced the launch of Viking Expeditions with a planned January 2022 debut. It would become the expeditions arm of the brand and operate small-ship trips to exotic destinations. It also finalized its river cruising business' expansion plans into the United States with the announcement of the first vessel's debut in August 2022 on the Mississippi River.

In May 2024, Viking Holdings Ltd completed an initial public offering (IPO) on the New York Stock Exchange under the symbol NYSE: VIK, pricing shares at $24 and raising approximately $1.54 billion from the sale of 64.04 million shares by the company and existing investors.

In May 2026, the company announced that Leah Talactac, President and Chief Financial Officer, has been appointed as Chief Executive Officer. Torstein Hagen, Chairman and CEO, has been appointed as Executive Chairman and will continue to serve as Chairman of Viking’s Board of Directors.

== River cruises ==
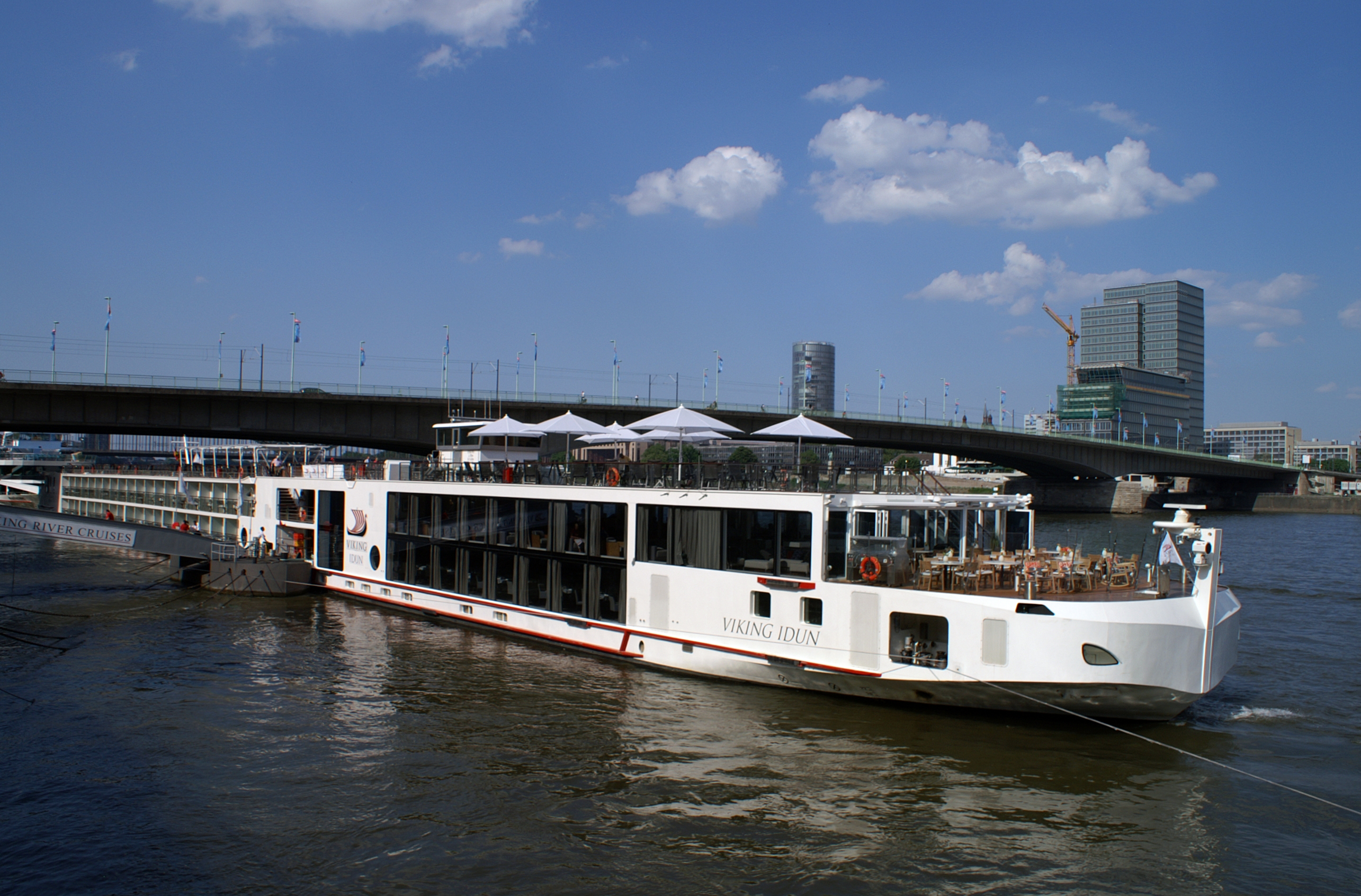
Viking Idun at Köln in 2012

Viking River Cruises offers cruising along the rivers of Europe, Russia, Southeast Asia and Egypt, with plans to expand into the United States of America along the Mississippi River in 2022. Viking's European ships have an average capacity of 190 passengers; its Russian ships' capacity averages just over 200. As of 31 December 2025, Viking reported a fleet of 103 vessels across its river, ocean and expedition operations.

=== Fleet ===
Ship	IMO	Maiden Voyage	Builder	Length	Gross Tonnage	Flag	Staterooms	Passengers
Viking Aegir	8339732	2012	Neptun Werft	135 m / 443 ft	3,138 tons	Switzerland	95	190
Viking Alruna	8352241	2016	Neptun Werft	135 m / 443 ft	3,138 tons	Switzerland	95	190
Viking Alsvin	8339938	2014	Neptun Werft	135 m / 443 ft	3,138 tons	Switzerland	95	190
Viking Astrild	8352277	2015	Neptun Werft	110 m / 361 ft		Switzerland	49	98
Viking Atla	8339794	2013	Neptun Werft	135 m / 443 ft	3,138 tons	Switzerland	95	190
Viking Aton	9911173	2023	Maasara Shipyard	72 m / 236 ft	210 tons	Egypt	41	82
Viking Baldur	8339809	2013	Neptun Werft	135 m / 443 ft	3,138 tons	Switzerland	95	190
Viking Bestla	8339926	2014	Neptun Werft	135 m / 443 ft	3,138 tons	Switzerland	95	190
Viking Beyla	8352265	2015	Neptun Werft	110 m / 361 ft		Switzerland	49	98
Viking Bragi	8339756	2013	Neptun Werft	135 m / 443 ft	3,138 tons	Switzerland	95	190
Viking Buri	8338776	2014	Neptun Werft	135 m / 443 ft	3,138 tons	Switzerland	95	190
Viking Delling	8338805	2014	Neptun Werft	135 m / 443 ft	3,138 tons	Switzerland	95	190
Viking Egdir	9916915	2021	Neptun Werft	135 m / 443 ft	3,138 tons	Switzerland	95	190
Viking Egil	8352253	2016	Neptun Werft	135 m / 443 ft	3,138 tons	Switzerland	95	190
Viking Einar	8338257	2019	Neptun Werft	135 m / 443 ft	3,138 tons	Switzerland	95	190
Viking Eir	8339940	2015	Neptun Werft	135 m / 443 ft	3,138 tons	Switzerland	95	190
Viking Eistla	8339914	2014	Neptun Werft	135 m / 443 ft	3,138 tons	Switzerland	95	190
Viking Embla	8339720	2012	Neptun Werft	135 m / 443 ft	3,138 tons	Switzerland	95	190
Viking Fjorgyn	9916898	2020	Neptun Werft	125 m / 410 ft	2,800 tons	Switzerland	84	168
Viking Forseti	8338764	2013	Neptun Werft	135 m / 443 ft	3,138 tons	Switzerland	95	190
Viking Freya	8339706	2012	Neptun Werft	135 m / 443 ft	3,138 tons	Switzerland	95	190
Viking Gefjon	8339990	2015	Neptun Werft	135 m / 443 ft	3,138 tons	Switzerland	95	190
Viking Gersemi	9916850	2020	Neptun Werft	135 m / 443 ft	3,138 tons	Switzerland	95	190
Viking Gullveig	8339847	2014	Neptun Werft	135 m / 443 ft	3,138 tons	Switzerland	95	190
Viking Hathor	9985576	2024	Maasara Shipyard	72 m / 236 ft	210 tons	Egypt	41	82
Viking Heimdal	8338788	2014	Neptun Werft	135 m / 443 ft	3,138 tons	Switzerland	95	190
Viking Helgrim	9904900	2019	Neptun Werft	80 m / 262 ft	2,212 tons	Portugal	53	106
Viking Hemming	8352289	2014	Neptun Werft	80 m / 262 ft	2,212 tons	Portugal	53	106
Viking Herja	8338233	2016	Neptun Werft	135 m / 443 ft	3,138 tons	Switzerland	95	190
Viking Hermod	8339823	2014	Neptun Werft	135 m / 443 ft	3,138 tons	Switzerland	95	190
Viking Hervor	9916848	2020	Neptun Werft	135 m / 443 ft	3,138 tons	Switzerland	95	190
Viking Hild	8338221	2016	Neptun Werft	135 m / 443 ft	3,138 tons	Switzerland	95	190
Viking Hlin	8339885	2014	Neptun Werft	135 m / 443 ft	3,138 tons	Switzerland	95	190
Viking Idi	8339861	2014	Neptun Werft	135 m / 443 ft	3,138 tons	Switzerland	95	190
Viking Idun	8339691	2012	Neptun Werft	135 m / 443 ft	3,138 tons	Switzerland	95	190
Viking Ingvi	8339902	2014	Neptun Werft	135 m / 443 ft	3,138 tons	Switzerland	95	190
Viking Jarl	8339782	2013	Neptun Werft	135 m / 443 ft	3,138 tons	Switzerland	95	190
Viking Kadlin	8338790	2016	Neptun Werft	135 m / 443 ft	3,138 tons	Switzerland	95	190
Viking Kara	8339873	2014	Neptun Werft	135 m / 443 ft	3,138 tons	Switzerland	95	190
Viking Kari	9916862	2020	Neptun Werft	125 m / 410 ft	2,800 tons	Switzerland	84	168
Viking Kvasir	8339859	2014	Neptun Werft	135 m / 443 ft	3,138 tons	Switzerland	95	190
Viking Lif	8339835	2014	Neptun Werft	135 m / 443 ft	3,138 tons	Switzerland	95	190
Viking Lofn	8339952	2015	Neptun Werft	135 m / 443 ft	3,138 tons	Switzerland	95	190
Viking Magni	8339811	2013	Neptun Werft	135 m / 443 ft	3,138 tons	Switzerland	95	190
Viking Mani	8339897	2015	Neptun Werft	135 m / 443 ft	3,138 tons	Switzerland	95	190
Viking Mimir	8352198	2015	Neptun Werft	135 m / 443 ft	3,138 tons	Switzerland	95	190
Viking Mississippi		2022	Edison Chouest	137 m / 450 ft	12,621 tons	United States	193	386
Viking Modi	8339988	2015	Neptun Werft	135 m / 443 ft	3,138 tons	Switzerland	95	190
Viking Njord	8339718	2012	Neptun Werft	135 m / 443 ft	3,138 tons	Switzerland	95	190
Viking Odin	8339718	2012	Neptun Werft	135 m / 443 ft	3,138 tons	Switzerland	95	190
Viking Osfrid	8338049	2016	Neptun Werft	80 m / 262 ft	2,021 tons	Portugal	53	106
Viking Osiris	9869746	2020	Maasara Shipyard	72 m / 236 ft	210 tons	Egypt	41	82
Viking Prestige		2011	Neptun Werft	135 m / 443 ft	3,138 tons	Switzerland	97	188
Viking Ra		2018	Maasara Shipyard	75 m / 245 ft	210 tons	Egypt	26	52
Viking Radgrid	9916874	2020	Neptun Werft	125 m / 410 ft	2,800 tons	Switzerland	84	168
Viking Rinda	8338752	2013	Neptun Werft	135 m / 443 ft	3,138 tons	Switzerland	95	190
Viking Rolf	8352215	2016	Neptun Werft	135 m / 443 ft	3,138 tons	Switzerland	95	190
Viking Sigrun	8338245	2019	Neptun Werft	135 m / 443 ft	3,138 tons	Switzerland	95	190
Viking Sigyn	8338295	2019	Neptun Werft	135 m / 443 ft	3,138 tons	Switzerland	95	190
Viking Skadi	8339744	2019	Neptun Werft	135 m / 443 ft	3,138 tons	Switzerland	95	190
Viking Skaga	9916886	2020	Neptun Werft	125 m / 410 ft	2,800 tons	Switzerland	84	168
Viking Skirnir	8339976	2015	Neptun Werft	135 m / 443 ft	3,138 tons	Switzerland	95	190
Viking Sobek	9985588	2024	Massara shipyard	72 m / 236 ft	210 tons	Egypt	41	82
Viking Tialfi	8352239	2016	Neptun Werft	135 m / 443 ft	3,138 tons	Switzerland	95	190
Viking Tir	8338269	2019	Neptun Werft	135 m / 443 ft	3,138 tons	Switzerland	95	190
Viking Tor	8339768	2013	Neptun Werft	135 m / 443 ft	3,138 tons	Switzerland	95	190
Viking Torgil	8339768	2014	Neptun Werft	80 m / 262 ft	2,212 tons	Portugal	53	106
Viking Ullur	8338283	2019	Neptun Werft	135 m / 443 ft	3,138 tons	Switzerland	95	190
Viking Vali	8338271	2019	Neptun Werft	135 m / 443 ft	3,138 tons	Switzerland	95	190
Viking Var	8339770	2013	Neptun Werft	135 m / 443 ft	3,138 tons	Switzerland	95	190
Viking Ve	8340004	2015	Neptun Werft	135 m / 443 ft	3,138 tons	Switzerland	95	190
Viking Vidar	8339964	2015	Neptun Werft	135 m / 443 ft	3,138 tons	Switzerland	95	190
Viking Vilhjalm	8352227	2013	Neptun Werft	135 m / 443 ft	3,138 tons	Switzerland	95	190
Viking Vili	8352203	2015	Neptun Werft	135 m / 443 ft	3,138 tons	Switzerland	95	190

In 2023, Viking ordered another ship from Neptun Werft. The delivery is scheduled for March 2025. Nine more ships are ordered at Meyer Werft for delivery in 2025 and 2026.

=== Chartered ships ===
Ship	IMO	Maiden Voyage	Builder	Length	Gross Tonnage	Flag	Staterooms	Passengers	Notes
MS Antares		2017		126 m / 413 ft		Egypt	24	52	Also sailing as Amarco II
Viking Akun	8707707	2014	VEB Elbewerften Boizenburg	129 m / 423 ft	5,475 tons	Russia	102	204	Formerly MS Koshevoy
Viking Emerald		2011	East Wind Co Ltd	110 m / 361 ft	7,100 tons	China	128	256	Leased Century Emerald
Viking Helgi	8422606	2013	VEB Elbewerften Boizenburg	129 m / 423 ft	5,344 tons	Russia	102	204	Formerly Aleksey Surkov
Viking Ingvar	8793249	2013	VEB Elbewerften Boizenburg	129 m / 423 ft	5,475 tons	Russia	102	204	Formerly Narkom Pakhomov
Viking Mekong		2002		55 m / 180 ft	900 tons	Vietnam	28	56	Also sailing as RV Bassac Pandaw
Viking Rurik	7515418	2012	RSW Rosslauer Schiffswerft	125 m / 410 ft	5,640 tons	Russia	98	196	Formerly Peterhof, Mariya Ulyanova
Viking Saigon		2021		80 m / 262 ft		Vietnam	40	80	
Viking Sineus	7823994	2014	RSW Rosslauer Schiffswerft	125 m / 410 ft	5,182 tons	Ukraine	98	196	Formerly Mikhail Lomonosov
Viking Truvor	8707680	2013	VEB Elbewerften Boizenburg	129 m / 423 ft	5,414 tons	Russia	102	204	Formerly Sergey Kirov

=== Former fleet ===
Ship	Maiden voyage	Length	Staterooms	Passengers	Notes
Viking Britannia		110 m / 360 ft	90	180	Retired as MS Britannia
Viking Burgundy	2000	110 m / 360 ft	75	150	Sailing now as MS Crucebelle. Formerly Viking Sky.
Viking Danube	1999	110 m / 360 ft	75	150	
Viking Deustchland	2001	110 m / 360 ft	90	180	
Viking Douro	2011	80 m / 262 ft	65	130	Sailing now as MS Douro Spirit
Viking Eurodiamond		82 m / 269 ft	42	84	Sailing now as MS Johannes Brahms
Viking Europe	2001	114 m / 375 ft	75	150	Sailing now as MS Carmen
Viking Fontane	2010	95 m / 311 ft	56	112	Sailing now as MS Junker Jorg
Viking Helvetia	2002	132 m / 433 ft	99	198	Sailing now as MS Rhein Symphonie
Viking Lavrinenkov	2001	129 m / 423 ft	110	212	Sailing now as MS General Lavrinenkov
Viking Legend	2009	135 m / 443 ft	97	188	Now hostel Dutch Harmony
Viking Mandalay	2002	55 m / 180 ft	28	56	Sailing now as RV Katha Pandaw
Viking Neptune	2001	114 m / 375 ft	75	150	Sailing now as MS Verdi
Viking Normandie	2000	91 m / 300 ft	51	100	Sailing now as Normandie
Viking Orient	2011	55 m / 180 ft	28	56	Sailing now as RV Orient Pandaw
Viking Pride	2001	114 m / 375 ft	75	150	
Viking Primadonna	1998	113 m / 372 ft	74	148	Sailing now as MS Primadonna
Viking Seine	2000	110 m / 360 ft	75	150	Sailing now as MS Crucestar. Formerly Viking Rhône.
Viking Schumann	2011	95 m / 311 ft	56	112	Sailing now as MS De Amsterdam
Viking Spirit	2001	114 m / 375 ft	75	150	
Viking Star	2000	110 m / 360 ft	75	150	
Viking Sun	2006	132 m / 433 ft	99	198	Sailing now as MS Rhein Melodie
Century Sky	2005	127 m / 415 ft	153	306	
Century Star	2003	87 m / 285 ft	93	186	
Century Sun	2006	127 m / 415 ft	153	306	
MS Amadeus Elegant	2010	110 m / 361 ft	76	150	
MS Esplanade	2012	77 m / 253 ft	67	150	
MS Mayfair	2010	75 m / 246 ft	104	148	
MS Omar El Khayam	2008	113 m / 371 ft	88	160	
MS Symphony	1998	110 m / 361 ft	83	146	
MS Vienna	2006	135 m / 443 ft	82	164	
Prince Abbas	2007	59 m /192 ft	65	130	
Road to Mandalay	2008	102 m / 335 ft	43	82	
Royal Lily	1998	74 m / 244 ft	60	120	
Royal Lotus	1998	74 m / 244 ft	60	120	
RV Tonle Pandaw	2002	55 m / 180 ft	38	66	

== Ocean cruises ==
The Viking Ocean Cruises division was formed in 2013. It began operating its first vessel, Viking Star, in 2015, with itineraries in Scandinavia, the British Isles, the Baltic and Mediterranean Sea. Viking Sea joined the fleet in 2016; and its third and fourth ships, Viking Sky and Viking Sun, were added in 2017. Each of Viking Ocean Cruises first four vessels were named after the first four vessels of Royal Viking Line, whom Viking Cruises founder Torstein Hagen was CEO of from 1980 to 1985.

In June 2018, Viking's fifth ocean vessel, Viking Orion, was added to the fleet. Being one-third the size of many cruise ships being built by major cruise lines, this allows the Viking Star-class to enter into smaller ports. Its overall length is 745.4 ft. (227.2 m); its beam is 94.5 ft. (28.8 m); the draft is 20.7 ft. (6.3 m); with a gross tonnage of 47,800 GT. The nine ships were built by Fincantieri shipyard in Ancona, Italy, and the Scandinavian influenced, modernist interior design was developed by London-based SMC Design and Los Angeles–based Rottet Studio.

Viking's itineraries feature travel in Northern Europe, the Baltic, the Americas, the Caribbean, the Mediterranean, Asia, Australia and New Zealand. Their ships spend more time in port than is common at other ocean lines, emphasizing a focus on the culture of their destinations. Viking Ocean Cruises' vessels carry up to 930 passengers and 550 crew.

In 2017–2018, Viking Sun made the company's first round-the-world cruise, which departed from Miami, and sailed south to head through the Panama Canal, and planned to visit five continents, 35 countries and 64 ports before ending its 141-day journey in London. In May 2018, Viking Cruises announced its intention to launch a new package called Ultimate World Cruise, which it claimed to be the longest continuous world cruise itinerary in history. Its most expensive package would cover 245 days on Viking Sun and stop at 59 countries and 113 ports.

=== Fleet ===
Ship	year built	Builder	Length	Gross Tonnage	Flag	Staterooms	Passengers	Christened by	Photo
Viking Star	2015	Fincantieri	227 m / 745 ft	47,842 tons	Norway	465	930	Trude Drevland (Norwegian Politician)	
Viking Sea	2016	Fincantieri	227 m / 745 ft	47,842 tons	Norway	465	930	Karine Hagen (Executive Vice President of Viking)	
Viking Sky	2017	Fincantieri	227 m / 745 ft	47,842 tons	Norway	465	930	Marit Barstad (Chairman's Sister)	
Viking Yidun (built as Viking Sun)	2017 (re-entered in 2026)	Fincantieri	227 m	47,842 tons	Norway	465	930	Yi Loo (Vice President of China Merchant Bank Financial Leasing)	
Viking Orion	2018	Fincantieri	227 m / 745 ft	47,861 tons	Norway	465	930	Anna Fisher (Astronaut)	
Viking Jupiter	2019	Fincantieri	227 m / 745 ft	47,842 tons	Norway	465	930	Sissel Kyrkjebø (Norwegian Singer)	
Viking Venus	2021	Fincantieri	227 m / 745 ft	47,842 tons	Norway	465	930	Anne Diamond (British Journalist)	
Viking Mars	2022	Fincantieri, Ancona	227 m	47,842 tons	Norway	465	930	Lady Fiona Carnarvon (Countess of Carnarvon)	
Viking Neptune	2022	Fincantieri, Ancona	227 m	47,842 tons	Norway	465	930	Nicole Stott (Astronaut)	
Viking Saturn	2023	Fincantieri, Ancona	227 m	47,842 tons	Norway	465	930	Ann Ziff (Metropolitan Opera Chairman)	
Viking Vela	2024	Fincantieri	238 m	53,769 tons	Norway	499	998	Ivana Elice (Vice President and Project Manager, Fincantieri Cruise Business Unit)	
Viking Vesta	2025	Fincantieri, Ancona	238 m	54,300 tons	Norway	499	998	Lene Tangevald-Jensen (Norwegian journalist)	
Viking Mira	2026	Fincantieri	238 m	54,300	Norway	490	998		

=== Future Ocean ships ===
The future Viking Ocean fleet will be slightly enlarged versions of the same class to accommodate new fuel cell technology

Ship	Maiden Voyage	Builder	Length	Gross Tonnage	Planned Flag	Planned Staterooms	Planned Passengers
Enlarged Hydrogen-Fuel Cell Ocean Ships (beginning 2024)
Viking Libra	December 2026	Fincantieri	238 m	54,300	Norway	490	998
Viking Astrea	June 2027	Fincantieri	238 m	54,300	Norway	490	998
Viking Lyra	May 2028	Fincantieri	238 m	TBD	Norway	490	TBD
TBA	May 2029	Fincantieri	238 m	TBD	Norway	490	TBD
TBA	November 2029	Fincantieri	238 m	TBD	Norway	490	TBD
TBA	May 2030	Fincantieri	238 m	TBD	Norway	490	TBD
TBA	November 2030	Fincantieri	238 m	TBD	Norway	490	TBD

In October 2024 Viking ordered two more ships for delivery in 2030 and options for four additional ships for delivery in 2031 and 2032

Viking Mira launched in July

== Expedition cruises ==
In April 2018, Viking Cruises and VARD announced Viking had signed a contract to order two "special" cruise ships from VARD that are expected to enter service in 2021 and 2022, with an option for two more. Planned to be built in Romania and Norway, the value of the contract was estimated to be worth around 5 billion Norwegian krone (about $611 million). The ships were expected to be expedition vessels.

In October 2019, it was first reported that Viking Cruises was planning to launch Viking Expeditions, the expeditions arm to the business, in early 2020, with initial itineraries focusing on the polar regions of the Arctic Circle and Antarctica. In January 2020, Viking officially announced the launch of Viking Expeditions. Expedition trips would be performed on smaller vessels designed to navigate through smaller waterways while also being capable of travelling through sea, and reach destinations such as polar regions and North America's Great Lakes. Scheduled to begin operating its first vessel in January 2022, named Viking Octantis, and its second in August, named Viking Polaris, Viking Expeditions will also partner with scientists from the National Oceanic and Atmospheric Administration (NOAA) to conduct research along with its own expedition team.

=== Fleet ===
Ship	Maiden Voyage	Builder	Length	Gross Tonnage	Flag	Staterooms	Passengers	Christened by	Photo
Viking Octantis	2022	VARD	203 m / 665 ft	30,150 tons	Norway	189	378	Liv Arnsen (Norwegian Explorer and skier)	
Viking Polaris	2022	VARD	203 m / 665 ft	30,150 tons	Norway	189	378	Ann Bancroft (Arctic Explorer & Author)	

== Sponsorships ==
Since 2011, Viking has sponsored programming on PBS's Masterpiece Theatre, including Downton Abbey, Sherlock and Poldark, and is a sponsor of National Geographic's Genius, a scripted series about the life of Albert Einstein. Viking has also sponsored the Los Angeles Philharmonic at The Hollywood Bowl, Metropolitan Opera, BBC, Munch Museum in Oslo, Norway, and Mariinsky Theatre in St. Petersburg, Russia.

== Sustainability ==
In February 2023, Viking announced a commitment to source 100% cage-free eggs across its global operations by 2025, following engagement with the Open Wing Alliance.

In 2023, Viking partnered with Fincantieri to begin development of hydrogen-powered cruise ships. This includes the ordering of new vessels (such as the Viking Libra and Viking Astrea) designed to test hydrogen fuel cells for onboard power, aiming for zero-emission operations in sensitive areas like the Norwegian Fjords.

== Accidents and incidents ==
On 11 September 2016, Viking Freya collided with a bridge near to Erlangen, Germany, crushing the wheelhouse; two crew members died.

On 23 March 2019, Viking Sky put out a mayday call after she suffered an engine failure in the Hustadvika Channel, off the coast of Norway. Six of Norway's fourteen rescue helicopters were sent to the scene, and 460 passengers were evacuated before the ship reached Molde under her own power. The vessel was attached to a tugboat as the anchors were inoperable. On 27 March 2019, Viking Sky arrived at a shipyard in Kristiansund for repairs. The next scheduled cruise was cancelled.

On 1 April 2019, Viking Idun collided with the oil tanker Chemical Marketer (IMO 9304291) in Terneuzen, in the Netherlands, not far from Antwerp. Five passengers were slightly injured; one crew member was taken to a hospital. The Marine Insurance report indicates that the Idun "suffered considerable damage to her bow" while the tanker "suffered several breaches to her hull".

On 29 May 2019, Viking Sigyn, during a sightseeing tour on the Danube, collided with a small tour boat, the Hableány, in Budapest, Hungary. Hableány sank with 35 people on board of whom 28 died. On 11 June 2019, the boat was recovered from the riverbed and deposited on a barge by a floating crane. The captain of the Viking Sigyn, identified as Yuriy C. and later as Yuriy Chaplinsky from Odesa, Ukraine, was arrested and held in custody on suspicion of endangering water transport and causing a mass-casualty incident. He was released on bail on 11 June 2019. According to Viking Cruises, Chaplinsky was also aboard the Viking Idun at the time of 1 April 2019 incident but was not acting as captain of that vessel at the time it collided with the oil tanker. Other reports stated that, according to Hungarian prosecutors he was, in fact, the captain of the Idun during the incident near Terneuzen. The Dutch Safety Board would not reveal the identity of captain of the ship during 1 April incident to the news media. A report from Hungary in mid October stated that the captain of the Sigyn, Yuriy Chaplinsky, was not impaired at the time of the crash and was on the bridge in control of the vessel. The Captain had stated that he "simply did not notice" the tour boat. Although news reports stated that he was not to "blame" for the crash, Captain Chaplinsky remained under pre-trial arrest as a suspect in "endangering water transport resulting in a fatal mass catastrophe and of failing to offer aid at the time of the crash", according to CBS News.

On the evening of 5 June 2019, a Viking ship, initially said to be the Viking Var, damaged the lock of Riedenburg, in the Rhine–Main–Danube Canal. After the impact, the lock could not be properly closed. No one was injured in the accident. The repair was expected to take two to three weeks to complete. Witnesses later indicated the vessel involved in that incident was actually Viking Tir.

On 29 November 2022, the Viking Polaris was hit by a rogue wave during a storm off the coast of Argentina. A glass screen was shattered and a female passenger died from flying glass. Four other people were injured.

On 18 August 2023, a crew member on Viking Mars died after falling overboard in the port of Cromarty Firth in Invergordon.

On 28 July 2026, the Viking Ullur river cruise ship ran fast aground on a sandbar in the Danube River about 15 miles upstream from Vidin. Bulgarian border police rescued the 186 passengers without any reported injuries.

== See also ==
- List of river cruise ships
