= Safe Return to Port requirement =

SOLAS requirement to be able to return to port

The International Maritime Organization is helping members comply with the Safe Return to Port requirement in the 2009 International Safety of Life at Sea treaty.

The requirement was prompted by the increasing size of passenger ships. The more passengers a vessel has the longer it takes to evacuate. The requirement defines thresholds, and how long the vessel should remain safe for evacuation. It defines a threshold where a ship's crew should be able to return to port without requiring passengers to evacuate.
