= MV Viking Sun =

Cruise ship built in 2017

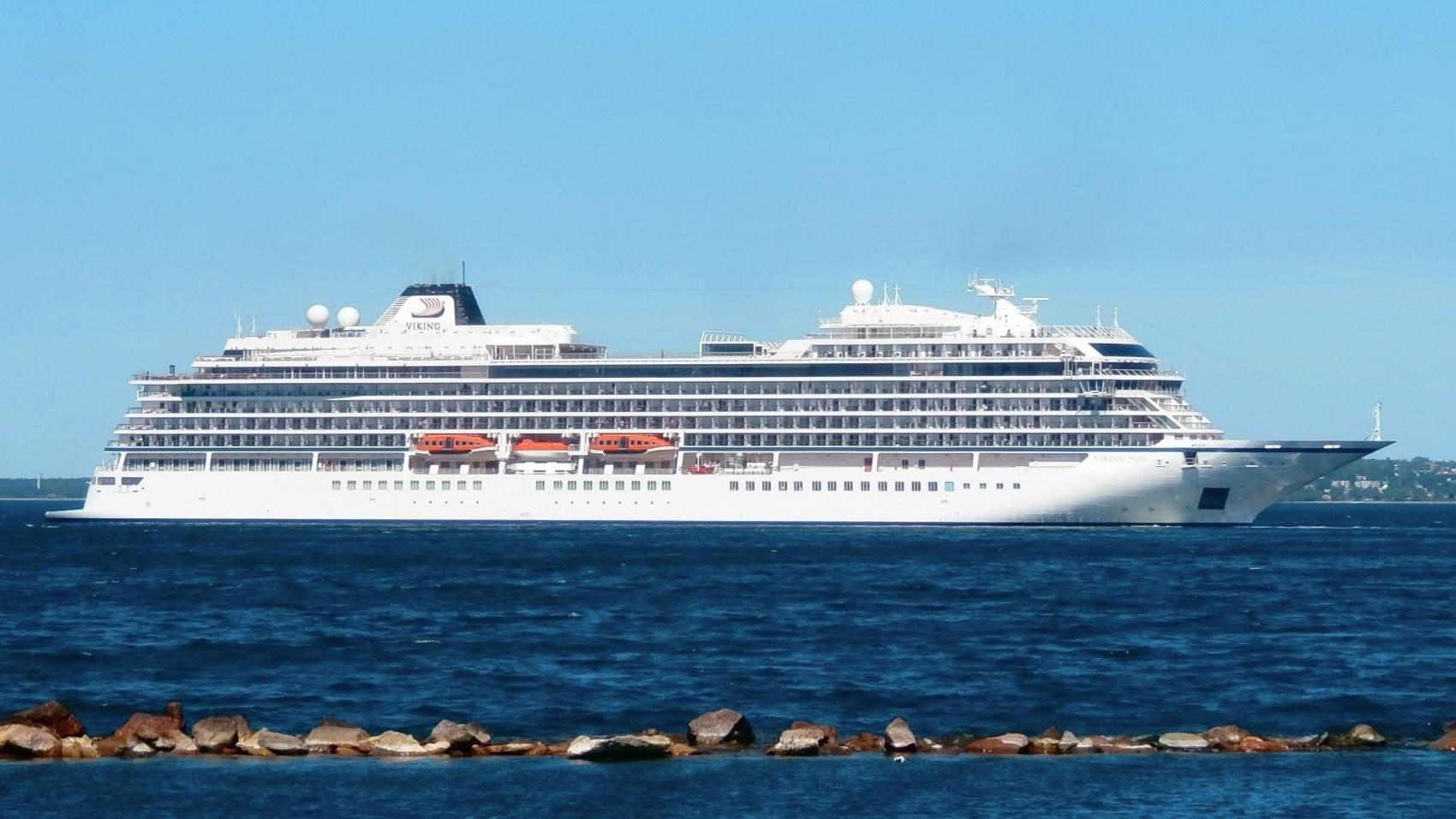
- Viking Sun in Tallinn, Estonia on May 28, 2018.

History
- Name: Viking Sun
- Namesake: Royal Viking Sun
- Operator: Viking Ocean Cruises
- Port of registry: Bergen, Norway
- Builder: Fincantieri
- Yard number: 6246
- Completed: September 2017
- Identification: IMO number: 9725433; MMSI number: 257179000; Call sign: LAYT7

History
- Name: Zhao Shang Yi Dun "招商伊敦"
- Namesake: China Merchants Group's first vessel "Yi Dun" from 1872
- Operator: China Merchants Viking Cruises
- Port of registry: Qianhai China
- Acquired: April 2021
- Identification: MMSI number: 414515000; Call sign: BOPU7

General characteristics
- Type: Cruise ship
- Tonnage: 47,842 GT; 4,797 DWT
- Length: 228.2 m (748 ft 8 in)
- Beam: 28.8 m (94 ft 6 in)
- Draught: 6.45 m (21 ft 2 in)
- Ice class: 1C
- Installed power: 2 × MAN 9L32/44CR (2 × 5,040 kW); 2 × MAN 12V32/44CR (2 × 6,720 kW)
- Propulsion: Diesel-electric, two shafts (2 × 7,250 kW)
- Speed: 17 knots (31 km/h; 20 mph) (service); 20 knots (37 km/h; 23 mph) (maximum)
- Capacity: 930 passengers
- Crew: 480

MV Viking Sun is a cruise ship operated by Viking Ocean Cruises. The fourth in a series of 930-passenger cruise ships to be built by Fincantieri for her operator, she was delivered at Fincantieri's shipyard in Ancona, Italy, on 25 September 2017.

In April 2021, ownership the Viking Sun was transferred to Viking Sun Ltd. of Bermuda, for operation by China Merchants Viking Cruises, a joint venture of Viking Ocean Cruises and China Merchants Shekou Cruises. She was then transferred to Chinese registration, with port of registry Qianhai, Shenzhen, and renamed Zhao Shang Yi Dun.
