= Rottet Studio =

- Industry: Architecture; Design
- Founded: (2008)
- Founder: Lauren Rottet
- Headquarters: Houston, Texas, United States
- Area served: Worldwide
- Website: www.rottetstudio.com

Rottet Studio is an international architecture and design firm based in Houston, Texas. The firm was founded by Lauren Rottet in 2008 and has offices in Los Angeles and New York City, as well as a presence in Asia in Hong Kong and Shanghai, China. The firm is WBE-certified and has designed a variety of corporate and hospitality projects both within the United States and abroad.

== Lauren Rottet ==
Lauren Rottet, Rottet Studio's founding principal, is a member of Interior Design's Hall of Fame and was the first woman to be a fellow of both the International Interior Design Association and the American Institute of Architects. She was also named Designer of the Year by Interiors magazine in 1994 and by Boutique Design in 2012. Rottet was born in Waco, Texas and moved to Houston at age of seven. She went to college at the University of Texas at Austin, where she originally majored in art and pre-med. Rottet's art consisted mostly of drawings and paintings of buildings, so she changed her major to architecture and graduated from the University of Texas with a Bachelor of Architecture.

Rottet began working for Fisher Friedman Architects, a San Francisco, California-based firm, following her graduation from the University of Texas. At Fisher Friedman, she worked with upscale apartments and condominiums. Two years later, in 1980, Rottet moved to the Chicago office of Skidmore, Owings & Merrill. She later worked with the firm's Houston and Los Angeles offices. In 1990, she became a founding partner of Keating Mann Jernigan Rottet and, when the firm was acquired by Daniel, Mann, Johnson & Mendenhall in 1994, Rottet became director of DMJM Rottet's interior design studio.

In 2008, Rottet launched Rottet Studios.

== Notable Projects ==
=== Corporate ===
- Artis Capital Management, San Francisco, CA
- An Asset Management Company, New York, NY
- Johnson Downie, Houston, TX
- Mattel Design Center, El Segundo, CA
- Paul Hastings LLP, Various Locations
- United Talent Agency, Los Angeles, CA

=== Hospitality ===
- The Beverly Hills Presidential Bungalows, Beverly Hills, CA
- Philippe Restaurant + Lounge, Houston, TX
- St Regis Aspen Resort, Aspen, CO
- The Surrey Hotel, New York, NY
- The James Royal Palm, Miami Beach, FL
- Loews Regency Hotel, Manhattan, NY

== Furniture Lines ==
Rottet's interest in furniture design stemmed from a sofa she designed for her personal Los Angeles residence in 1991, entitled the Evaneau sofa. She has since designed custom furniture for many of Rottet Studio's projects. She designed most of the furniture for Paul, Hastings, Janofsky & Walker's Los Angeles offices. In November 2013, Rottet released a 33-piece furniture collection in collaboration with Decca Home.

== Art Selection ==
Rottet has curated artwork for many of the firm's projects as well as some side projects. She collaborated with Katherine Lo of the Langham Hospitality Group to select artwork for the Langham Hotel, in Chicago, IL. She also curated an art collection for the James Royal Palm hotel entitled "An Ocean Apart." Rottet curated an art program for a New York City-based asset management company, which consisted exclusively of photography, including photos from Robert Longo. The art selection for the Surrey Hotel featured work by Jenny Holzer, Rochard Serra. In 2008, Rottet curated an art-inspired furniture exhibition at the Barbara Davis Gallery.

== Select Awards ==
- Designer of the Year, Boutique Design, 2012.
- IIDA Texas - Oklahoma Honor Award, St. Regis Aspen Resort, 2012.
- IIDA Texas - Oklahoma Honor Award, Presidential Bungalows at The Beverly Hills Hotel, 2012.
- Best Hotel Design - Resort, Gold Key Hospitality Design Excellence Awards, The St. Regis Aspen Resort, 2012.
- Ranked #94 for corporate and hospitality Top 100 Design Giants, Interior Design Magazine, 2012
- Interior Design Best of Year Finalist, St. Regis Aspen Resort, 2012
- Interior Design Best of Year Finalist, An Asset Management Company, 2012
- Honorable Mention, Public Spaces, The James Royal Palm, Hospitality Design Awards, 2013
- AIA / Houston Honor Award, Johnson Downie, 2013
- IIDA Texas - Oklahoma Honor Award, The James Royal Palm, 2013.
- CoD+A Awards, Merit Award Winner, United Talent Agency, 2013
- CoD+A Awards, Merit Award Winner, The James Royal Palm, 2013
- International Design Awards, Bronze Award Winner for Conceptual Interior Design, New Hotel Concept, 2013
- International Design Awards, Silver Award Winner for Office Interior Design, An Asset Management Company, 2013
- International Design Awards, Gold Award Winner for Office Interior Design, United Talent Agency, 2013
