= Torstein Hagen =

Norwegian businessman

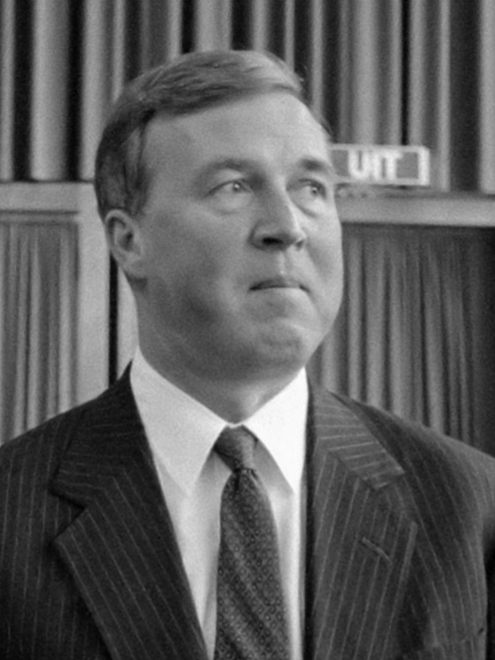
- Hagen in 1988
- Born: 1943 (age 82–83); Norway
- Education: Norwegian Institute of Technology; Harvard University
- Occupations: Founder & Chairman, Viking Cruises
- Years active: 1974–present
- Spouse: Ellen-Karine Hagen (div. 2017)
- Children: 2

Torstein Hagen (born 1943) is a Norwegian billionaire businessman, and the Founder and Chairman of Viking cruise line.

== Early life and education ==
Hagen was born and raised in Norway. He earned a degree in physics at the Norwegian Institute of Technology, where he completed his master thesis on artificial intelligence and machine learning, won a Fulbright grant to study in the United States, and received an MBA from Harvard Business School in 1968.

== Career ==
=== Early years in cruise industry (1974-1996) ===
Hagen was a consultant and later partner for McKinsey & Company in Europe, helping to bring Holland America Line back from near-bankruptcy in 1974. In 1976, he became CEO of Bergen Steamship Company (Bergenske Dampskibsselskab) and then became CEO of Royal Viking Line from 1980 to 1984. After a failed take-over bid, he had to resign in 1984. He joined the board of Holland America Line in 1985, and later was on the board of Kloster Cruise. In the early 1990s, he acquired a 27% stake in Nedlloyd, a Rotterdam-based shipping company, becoming the biggest shareholder. He sold his shares several years later at a loss.

=== Viking Cruises (1997-present) ===
In 1997, Hagen founded Viking River Cruises with the purchase of four river ships, launching the company with four Russian river cruises. Viking focuses on English language speakers over 55, especially Americans, and has more than 70 river cruise ships, which mainly navigate major European waterways. In May 2013, the company announced plans to start an ocean cruise division and changed its name to Viking Cruises. Its first ocean cruise was launched in 2015. As of 2016, Hagen has disposed of 23% of Viking Cruises to TPG Capital and the Canada Pension Plan Investment Board for a total of $672 million. As of 2017, the company has a fleet of over 60 vessels, and four ocean-going ships. At the beginning of 2020, Hagen announced that Viking would begin offering expedition tours. The first tour would be exploring Antarctica and the Great Lakes of North America in January 2022, with a second tour to begin in August 2022, sailing to Antarctica and the Arctic. The inauguration of the company’s first custom vessel is planned for August 2022.

== Personal life ==
Hagen is divorced with two children, and lives in Lucerne, Switzerland. His daughter Karine Hagen works for Viking River Cruises.
