= Fincantieri =

Italian shipbuilding company

Coordinates: 45°38′08.08″N 13°46′32.56″E

Fincantieri S.p.A.

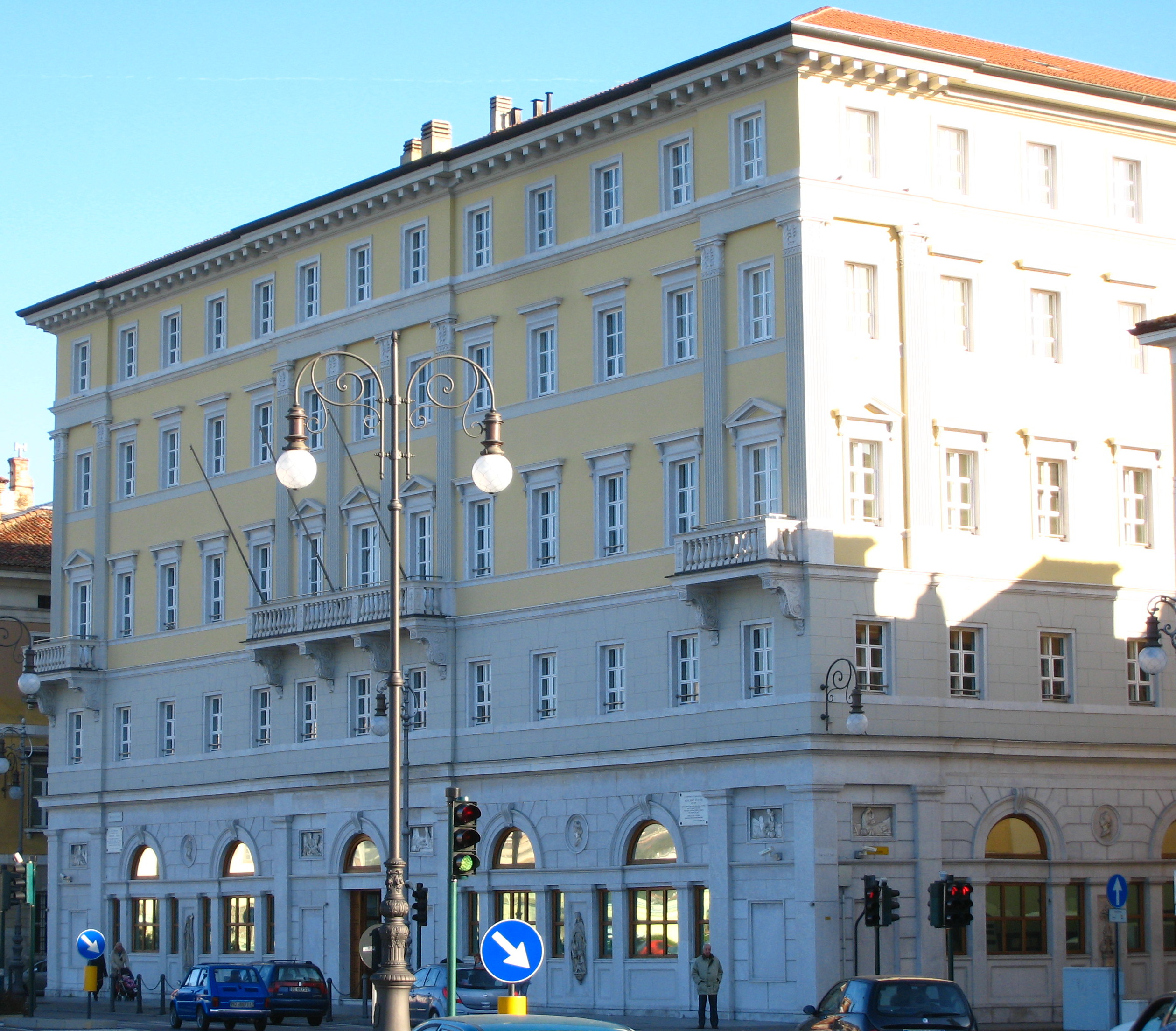
- Fincantieri headquarters in Trieste
- Type: Public
- Traded as: BIT: FCT; FTSE Italia Mid Cap
- ISIN: IT0005599938
- Industry: Shipbuilding; Defence
- Founded: 1959; 67 years ago in Rome
- Headquarters: Trieste, Italy
- Area served: Worldwide
- Key people: Biagio Mazzotta (Chairman); Pierroberto Folgiero (CEO)
- Revenue: ▲€9.194 billion (2025)
- Operating income: ▲€681 million (2025)
- Net income: ▲€117 million (2025)
- Total equity: ▲€987 million (2025)
- Owner: CDP Equity (64.21%)
- Number of employees: 24,370 (2025)
- Website: fincantieri.com

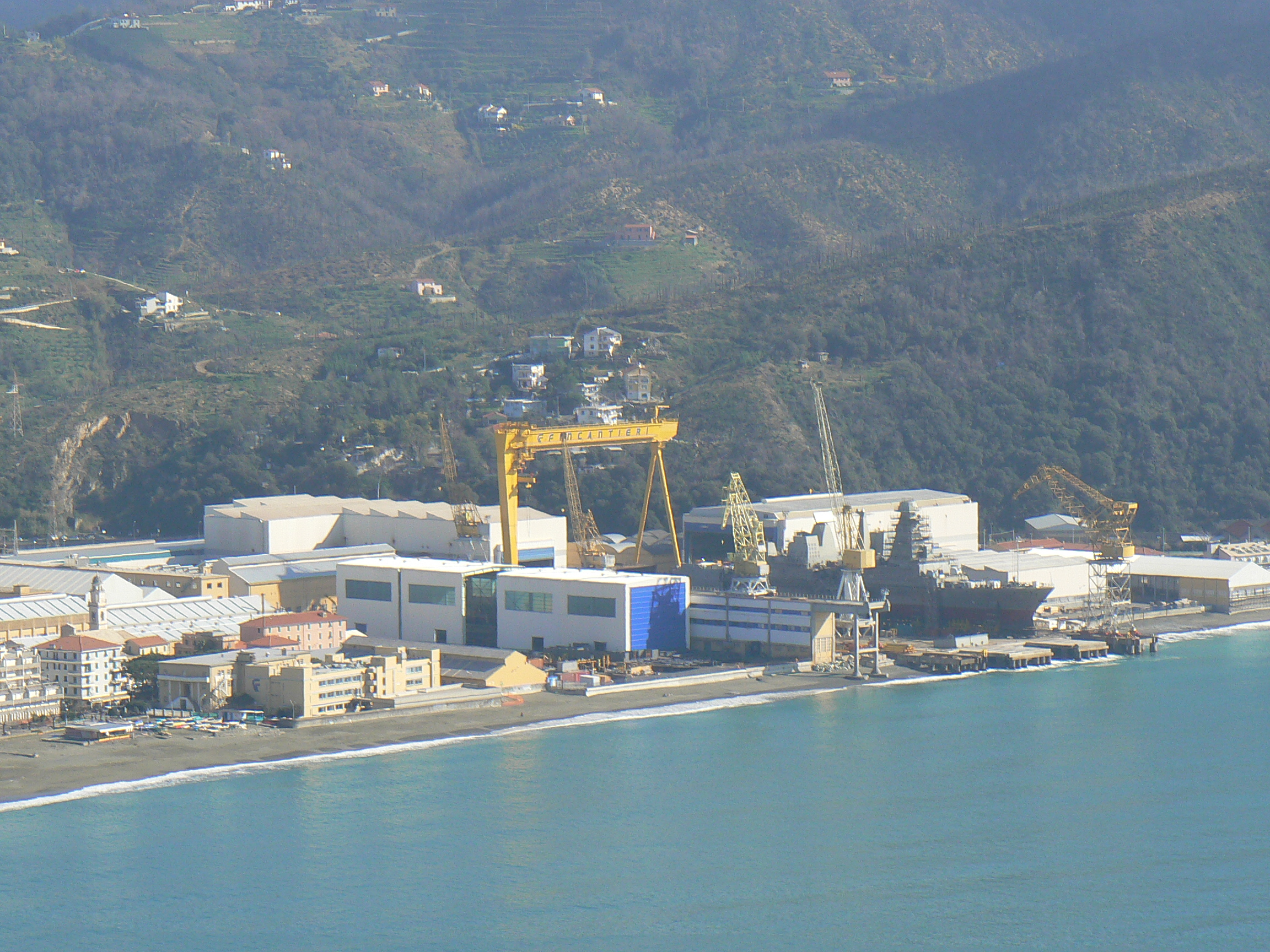
The shipyards of Riva Trigoso seen from Punta Manara. In the docks the Orizzonte-class destroyer Caio Duilio (D 554) nears completion.

Fincantieri S.p.A. (Italian pronunciation: [fiŋkanˈtjɛːri]) is an Italian shipbuilding company based in Trieste, Italy. It is the only operator active in every segment of high-tech shipbuilding: from cruise to naval ships, as well as offshore units and underwater solutions.

Officially established in 1959 as a financial company controlling the main Italian shipyards, bringing together over 230 years of history and more than 7,000 ships built, it is today one of the most important groups in the world and the largest in Europe, with a production network comprising 18 shipyards worldwide and more than 24,000 employees.

Owned by IRI since its foundation, it is currently 64.21% owned by CDP Equity S.p.A., the financial holding company of Cassa Depositi e Prestiti (a company controlled by the Ministry of Economy and Finance). The company is listed on the Borsa Italiana (Milan Stock Exchange) and is a component of FTSE Italia Mid Cap Index.

It is a member of SEA Europe, the association of European shipbuilders, while in Italy it is among the founding members of Assonave, the association of public shipyards, alongside Ancanap, the association of private shipyards.

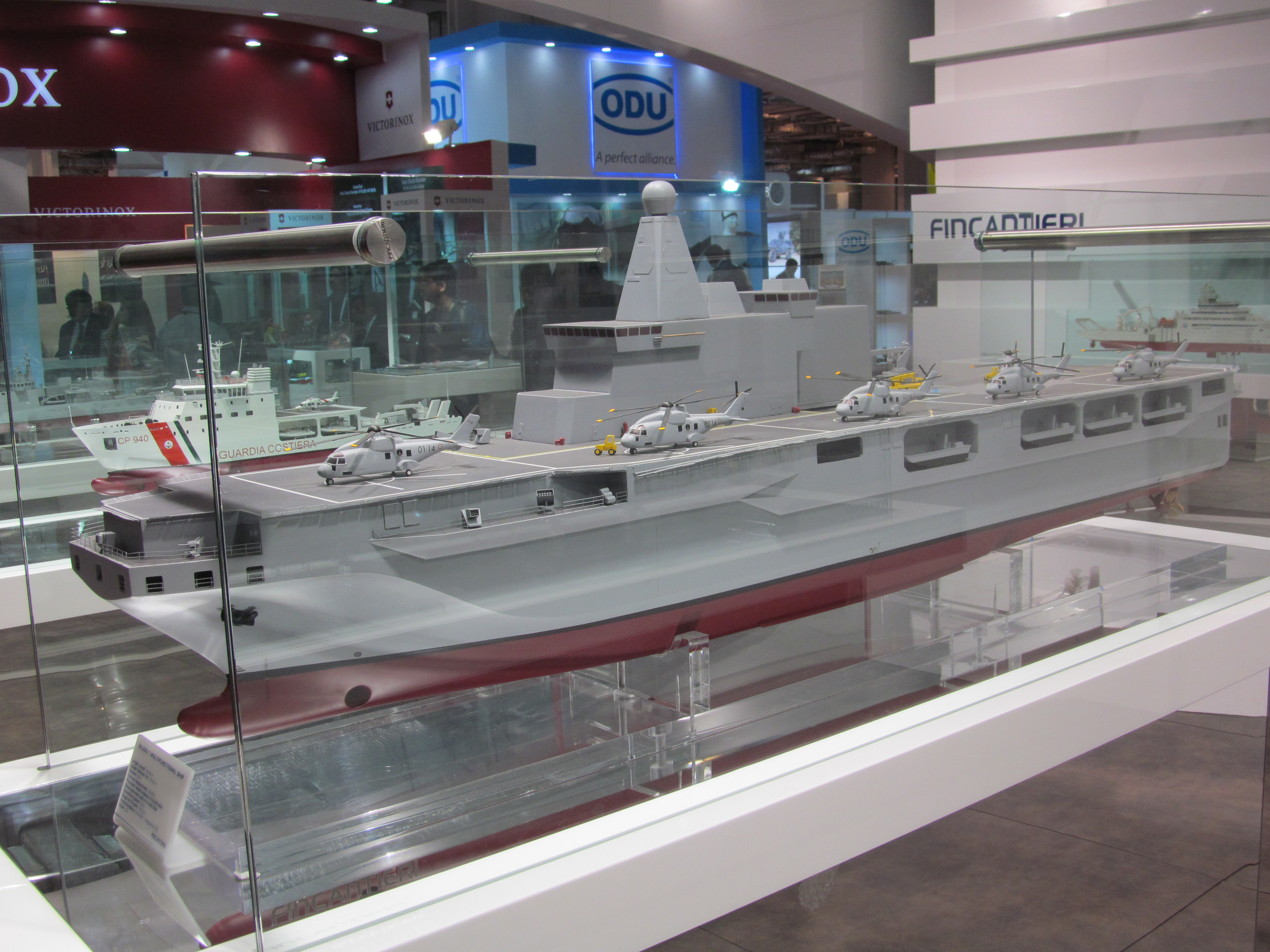
Model of a 20,000 ton navy ship

== History ==
=== From the origins to the restructuring of the 1980s ===
Fincantieri's roots date back to the 1930s, when the Italian State, through IRI, acquired the main shipbuilding centres: Cantieri Riuniti dell'Adriatico (CRDA), Odero-Terni-Orlando (OTO), Navalmeccanica and Ansaldo. In March 1948 these entities were merged into Finmeccanica, with the exception of OTO, which left the shipbuilding sector in 1949, selling its plants in Livorno and Muggiano to Ansaldo.

Fincantieri was officially founded on 29 December 1959 as Società Finanziaria Cantieri Navali – Fincantieri S.p.A., a financial company controlling the main Italian shipyards, bringing together all the IRI shareholdings previously held under Finmeccanica. In 1966 Italcantieri was established to directly manage some shipyards. In 1973 IRI acquired the Cantieri Navali del Tirreno Riuniti of the Piaggio group, with shipyards in Riva Trigoso, Muggiano, Ancona and Palermo. The company also owned Grandi Motori Trieste, which constructed marine diesel engines, but this was sold to Wärtsilä in 1999.

An important step took place in 1984, when Fincantieri ceased to be a mere financial holding company and became an operating company, incorporating its subsidiaries, including Italcantieri. At this stage, the company took the name "Fincantieri-Cantieri navali italiani S.p.A.", with headquarters in Trieste, and its activities were organized into four divisions: merchant shipbuilding, naval vessels, repairs/conversions and engines.

In 1992 the Destriero, a fast aluminium vessel built at the Muggiano shipyard, completed a 3,106-nautical-mile Atlantic crossing without refuelling, travelling at an average speed of 53.09 knots (98.32 km/h) and setting an absolute speed record that remains unbeaten.

=== International expansion and listing on the stock exchange ===
In the mid-1990s the market saw a recovery in shipbuilding, particularly in the cruise ship segment, where Fincantieri became a world leader, with a market share exceeding 25 per cent since 1995. In 2002, following the liquidation of IRI, ownership passed to Fintecna and subsequently to Cassa Depositi e Prestiti. With the disappearance of Intersind, the organization representing companies of the state-owned IRI and EFIM groups, Fincantieri also joined Confindustria.

In 2005 the Mega Yachts division was established, focusing on the design and construction of large luxury vessels, and in 2012 it delivered the first MY Serene, a 134-metre yacht winner of the Superyacht Design Award.

The 2008 Italian Government Economic and Financial Planning also provided for Fincantieri's listing on the Borsa Italiana, but in light of the global financial crisis, the company shelved the project until 2014.

Global expansion accelerated with the acquisition on 1 January 2009 of the US company Manitowoc Marine Group, now Fincantieri Marine Group, from its parent company The Manitowoc Company, Inc., which consisted of two shipyards in Wisconsin, including Marinette Marine, which built the first Freedom-class littoral combat ship. Fincantieri also purchased from Manitowoc Marine Group a topside repair yard in Ohio and one production plant in Wisconsin, making it one of the leading mid-sized shipbuilders in the United States for commercial and government customers, including the U.S. Navy and U.S. Coast Guard.

In December 2012 Fincantieri acquired STX OSV Holdings Ltd, the largest builder of vessels supporting oil and natural gas extraction and production activities, for €900 million. The acquisition, launched by Fincantieri Oil&Gas for a total of €455 million for the purchase of 50.75%, was completed for €900 million when the takeover bid was launched, financed through own funds and a group comprising Banca IMI, BNP Paribas, Banca Carige and UniCredit, Cassa Depositi e Prestiti. The loan was guaranteed by SACE, and the transaction closed in April 2013. This transaction marked Fincantieri's entry into the offshore shipbuilding sector. STX OSV was renamed Vard, from varde, a typical stone tower used in Norway as a navigational beacon along the coast. Through its subsidiary Vard Holdings Limited, Fincantieri acquired the Canadian company STX Canada Marine, specializing in naval design and engineering, for €8 million. Already the largest shipbuilder in Europe, after these acquisitions the group doubled in size to become the fourth largest in the world.

Also in 2013, the company resumed the project to list on the Milan stock exchange and was admitted to the Borsa Italiana on 12 June 2014: the listing process began on 16 June 2014 and ended on 27 June 2014. To celebrate the event, a ship's bow was installed at Palazzo Mezzanotte in Milan, appearing to emerge from the building itself. The debut took place on 3 July 2014.

On 9 October 2014, on the sidelines of the launch of the submarine Pietro Venuti (S 528) at the Muggiano shipyard, Finmeccanica, now Leonardo, and Fincantieri signed an important cooperation agreement for the construction of military vessels. The agreement provided for cooperation in research and innovation activities, as well as the possibility of creating a network of common suppliers for basic products and components.

On 21 November 2014 Fincantieri announced that it had signed major agreements with Carnival Corporation in the cruise ship sector and China State Shipbuilding Corporation in the shipbuilding sector for the construction of cruise ships involving technology transfer. In March 2015, Fincantieri won its biggest ever independent order from Carnival Corporation & plc in a 4 billion euro deal commissioning the company to build five new cruise ships.

=== Strategic acquisitions (2017–2021) ===
In May 2017, in a consortium with Fondazione Cassa di Risparmio di Trieste, Fincantieri won the tender for the sale of 66.66% of STX France, following the bankruptcy of its South Korean parent company Stx Offshore & Shipbuilding, with an offer of €79.5 million. The transaction was opposed by the French Government, which considered the STX France shipyards strategic at national level and declared its intention to proceed with the nationalization of the company, of which it already held the remaining 33.34%, under the pre-emption right provided for in previous agreements with the STX holding company.

After months of negotiations between Chigi Palace and the Élysée Palace, on 27 September 2017 Paolo Gentiloni, Prime Minister of Italy, and Emmanuel Macron, President of France, signed the final agreement in Lyon for the sale to Fincantieri of the majority stake in STX France, confirmed by the purchase agreement signed between Fincantieri and the French State on 2 February 2018. However, the integration was slowed by an investigation by the European antitrust authorities, which were concerned about the group's possible dominant position in the global cruise ship market. Finally, in January 2021, due to the global economic uncertainty caused by the COVID-19 pandemic and the failure to close the regulatory files, the governments of Italy and France jointly announced the cancellation of the transaction.

Despite the failed acquisition, binational cooperation materialized in the defence sector with the creation of Naviris in 2019, an equal joint venture between Fincantieri and Naval Group. Based in Genoa with a research centre in Ollioules, Naviris manages joint projects such as the modernization of Horizon-class vessels and the development of the European Patrol Corvette (EPC).

In 2017 Fincantieri Infrastructure S.p.A. was also established, based in Verona, dedicated to the design, construction and assembly of steel structures for large-scale projects, such as bridges, stadiums and other infrastructure. The division's most significant work was the reconstruction of the Viadotto Genova San Giorgio (formerly the Morandi Bridge), completed between 2019 and 2020. In 2021 the division expanded further with the acquisition of Inland, a company based in Gorizia and specialized in metal carpentry, and with the creation of Fincantieri Infrastructure Opere Marittime, dedicated to the construction of ports, quays and protective barriers.

In March 2018, Fincantieri established Fincantieri Services USA, a subsidiary based in Miami, Florida, USA. In August of the same year, together with MerMec, Fincantieri was close to acquiring 98.54% of Vitrociset: however, the agreement collapsed the following month when Leonardo, a minority shareholder of Vitrociset with 1.46%, decided to exercise the pre-emption right provided for by the company's articles of association, thereby acquiring the company.

In 2020 Fincantieri temporarily suspended its activities at Italian shipyards due to the Coronavirus pandemic. Despite the slowdown caused by the health emergency, the company completed the deliveries scheduled for the year, including that of the cruise ship Enchanted Princess, the 100th for the company.

=== New direction after 2020 ===
In response to changing geopolitical conditions, from 2020 Fincantieri expanded its activities in the defence and underwater sectors, as well as in the study and development of propulsion solutions using alternative energy sources.

In 2023 the company led the creation of the National Underwater Dimension Hub (it:Polo Nazionale della Subacquea) in La Spezia, dedicated to promoting research and development of solutions for the underwater sector. Also with the aim of strengthening itself in this area, Fincantieri launched a number of strategic partnerships and carried out targeted acquisitions. In February 2024 it acquired Remazel, a company operating in the offshore and underwater sectors, while in January 2025, as part of a framework for strengthening European Defence, including naval defence, it took over from Leonardo the naval armaments business of Whitehead Alenia Sistemi Subacquei, renamed WASS Submarine Systems, a historic company active in the construction of advanced underwater defence systems such as torpedoes and sonar.

In April 2024 the new Sun Princess was launched at the Monfalcone shipyard, Fincantieri's first ship powered by liquefied natural gas. The following year Fincantieri, in partnership with the Norwegian company Viking, presented the world's first cruise ship powered entirely by hydrogen stored on board. Construction of the vessel, named Viking Libra, is to be completed by the end of 2026 at the Ancona shipyard. In the following June, the order for the construction of the 4th new generation submarine of the Italian Navy was confirmed, for a total order value of 500 million euros.

On 18 July 2024, Fincantieri announced a partnership with Hera, for the optimized management of industrial waste produced on construction sites. This will allow Fincantieri to achieve ESG objectives within its shipyards. On 5 August, The Italian Navy has ordered a new patrol vessel worth approximately 236 million euros from Orizzonte Sistemi Navali, the joint venture active in the defence business between Fincantieri (51%) and Leonardo (49%).

On 5 February 2025, Fincantieri received from Norwegian Cruise Line a maxi contract worth 9 billion euros for four cruise ships with almost 226 thousand gross tons each to be delivered in 2030, 2032, 2034 and 2036 respectively. Also in 2025 the Minerva project officially began for the production of mini nuclear reactors for ships and military submarines and the construction of further nuclear-powered combat units, in response to a call by the Ministry of Defence and in collaboration with the Italian Navy. Also in 2025 the Navis Sapiens project was presented, combining artificial intelligence, big data and advanced connectivity to create a new generation of ships capable both of autonomously processing all onboard data and of communicating in real time with the shore and other fleet units.

== Activities ==
=== Cruise ships ===
The group's shipyards had a long tradition in the construction of large passenger vessels, including the ocean liner Rex, launched at the Sestri Ponente shipyard, which in 1933 won the prestigious Blue Riband.

In 1985, twenty years after the construction of its last ocean liners, the company officially entered the cruise ship sector with an order from SITMAR Cruises for a pair of sister ships, whose lines were designed by Renzo Piano. In 1990 the first of the two ships, Crown Princess, was delivered. The sustained growth of the market also made it possible to open new sites dedicated to the construction of cruise ships: the Marghera shipyard entered the sector with the delivery of Costa Classica in 1991, while the Sestri Ponente yard followed in 2003 with Costa Fortuna and the Ancona yard in 2009 with Silver Spirit.

Among the most significant ships built were Carnival Destiny (1996), the first cruise ship in the world to exceed 100,000 gross tons, and Grand Princess (1998), which at the time of her launch was the largest and most expensive passenger ship in the world.

In 2024 Sun Princess was delivered, the largest ship ever built in Italy, at approximately 175,500 gross tons, and Fincantieri's first ship powered by liquefied natural gas (LNG).

=== Naval vessels ===
In addition to being the sole supplier for the Italian Navy, Fincantieri also builds surface vessels for the navies of several other countries.

In the defence field, the company is also active in the development of self-driving systems. In particular, the subsidiary Fincantieri NexTech has developed platforms that integrate automation, remote control and interoperability technologies between different types of unmanned vehicles.

Among the most significant projects is the development of the new generation of FREMM frigates through a joint project between Italy and France. The first frigate of the Bergamini class, the designation used by the Italian Navy, was launched in July 2011 at the Riva Trigoso shipyard.

In addition, in 2020 the United States Department of Defense awarded the subsidiary Fincantieri Marinette Marine the contract to build the lead ship of the new Constellation-class FFG(X) multi-role frigates for the US Navy, based on a customized version of the FREMM design. This was the first time the company acted as a US prime contractor.

=== Underwater units ===
In the civilian field, Fincantieri develops solutions for mineral and scientific exploration of the deep ocean and for the construction and maintenance of underwater transmission and communication networks, particularly through the acquisition of Xtera and the partnership with Wsense.

In the military field, the company is the official supplier of underwater units to the Italian Navy, with the U212NFS (Near Future Submarine) programme, and produces defence systems such as underwater drones, torpedoes, electronic countermeasures and sonar through its subsidiary WASS Submarine Systems.

=== Offshore and specialized vessels ===
Following the acquisition of the Norwegian company Vard in 2013, Fincantieri became one of the world leaders in the design and construction of specialized vessels for offshore operations.

It is a market leader in the construction of Commissioning Service Operation Vessels (CSOVs) and Service Operation Vessels (SOVs), specialized in the construction and maintenance of offshore wind farms. These vessels feature hybrid battery propulsion solutions and are designed to be ready for the use of fuels such as hydrogen, ammonia and methanol. Major examples include ships produced for Edda Wind and Norwind Offshore, equipped with motion compensation systems that allow technical personnel to be transferred safely to platforms even in adverse sea and weather conditions.

The Group also operates in the segment of cable-laying vessels and subsea research vessels, building units capable of operating at extreme depths and in adverse conditions for operators such as Prysmian and NKT.

Among its historic and most significant constructions is also Saipem 7000, built at the Monfalcone shipyard, which remains one of the largest semi-submersible crane vessels in the world thanks to an overall lifting capacity of 14,000 tonnes.

=== Ferries ===
Fincantieri has built ro-ro passenger and cargo ships since the 1960s, when this type of vessel became established in Italy. The shipyards mainly involved in their construction are those of Palermo, Ancona and Castellammare di Stabia.

From the 2010s onward, Fincantieri focused on building dual-fuel units, with engines powered by diesel and methane gas, and hybrid units, with electro-thermal propulsion. In particular, in 2014 the ferry F.A. Gauthier was launched, the first gas-powered vessel operating in North America, while in 2026 the Costanza I di Sicilia, intended for connections with the smaller Sicilian islands, is scheduled for completion.

=== Equipment, systems and infrastructure ===
The division supports all other areas, from cruise ships to defence, managing the entire life cycle of critical onboard systems and handling the design and construction of integrated equipment for propulsion, manoeuvrability and stabilization, as well as the generation of electrical and thermal energy for both maritime uses and large industrial plants. Fincantieri's activities are organized into three hubs: Electronics and Digital Products, Mechanical Systems and Components, and Infrastructure, integrating ship production with proprietary technological solutions.

The Infrastructure Hub is instead dedicated to the construction of major civil and maritime works, from bridges and industrial buildings to hydraulic and port infrastructure, such as breakwaters and quays.

Among the main infrastructure projects carried out was the construction of the Viadotto Genova San Giorgio, awarded in 2018 to a consortium including Fincantieri Infrastructure, Webuild and Italferr. The metal decks of the new bridge were built at the Castellammare di Stabia and Sestri Ponente plants, after which the sections were transported to Genoa for assembly. In 2020, the subsidiary Fincantieri Infrastructure Opere Marittime was also awarded the reconstruction of the marina in Rapallo, destroyed after the storm surge of October 2018, and the construction of the new breakwater at the port of Vado Ligure.

Internationally, among the main contracts awarded to the company were:

- the design and construction, between 2018 and 2020, of eight steel bridges over the Albert Canal in Belgium, as part of a modernization plan to allow the passage of larger ships;
- the construction in 2021 of a new cruise terminal in Miami;
- the construction of the steel deck for the Brăila Bridge over the Danube in Romania, inaugurated in 2023 and currently the second-longest suspension bridge in continental Europe.

Fincantieri also contributed to the construction of the aeronautical aluminium structures of the Olympic cauldrons for Milano-Cortina 2026.

== Ships built at Fincantieri (selection) ==
- 1967 – Vittorio Veneto (550), a cruiser, for the Italian Navy
- 1983 – Giuseppe Garibaldi, an aircraft carrier for the Italian Navy
- 1990 – Pacific Jewel (69,845 GT) for P&O Cruises Australia
- 1991 – Pacific Dawn (70,285 GT) for P&O Cruises Australia
- 1993 – MS Statendam (55,451 GT) for Holland America Line
- 1993 – MS Maasdam (55,575 GT) for Holland America Line
- 1994 – MS Ryndam (55,819 GT) for Holland America Line
- 1995 – Sun Princess (77,499 GT) for Princess Cruises
- 1995 – Carnival Destiny (101,353 GT) for Carnival Cruise Lines
- 1996 – MS Veendam (57,092 GT) for Holland America Line
- 1996 – Dawn Princess (77,499 GT) for Princess Cruises
- 1997 – MS Rotterdam (61,849 GT) for Holland America Line
- 1998 – Sea Princess (77,499 GT) for Princess Cruises
- 1998 – Disney Magic (83,000 GT) for Disney Cruise Line
- 1999 – MS Volendam (60,906 GT) for Holland America Line
- 1999 – Carnival Triumph (101,509 GT) for Carnival Cruise Lines
- 1999 – Disney Wonder (83,000 GT) for Disney Cruise Line
- 2000 – MS Zaandam (61,396 GT) for Holland America Line
- 2000 – MS Amsterdam (62,735 GT) for Holland America Line
- 2000 – MV Oceana (77,499 GT) for P&O Cruises
- 2000 – Carnival Victory (101,509 GT) for Carnival Cruise Lines
- 2001 – MS Zuiderdam (81,769 GT) for Holland America Line
- 2002 – Carnival Conquest (110,000 GT) for Carnival Cruise Lines
- 2002 – MS Oosterdam (82,000 GT) for Holland America Line
- 2003 - Caribbean Princess (113,000 GT) for Princess Cruises
- 2003 – RV Petrel (3,371 GT) for Uksnoy & Co A/S
- 2003 – Carnival Glory (110,000 GT) for Carnival Cruise Lines
- 2003 – Costa Fortuna (102,587 GT) for Costa Crociere
- 2003 – Costa Magica (102,587 GT) for Costa Crociere
- 2004 – MS Westerdam (81,811 GT) for Holland America Line
- 2004 – Carnival Valor (110,000 GT) for Carnival Cruise Lines
- 2004 – Cavour (550), an aircraft carrier, for the Italian Navy
- 2005 – Andrea Doria (D 553), a destroyer, for the Italian Navy
- 2005 – Costa Concordia (114,137 GT) for Costa Crociere
- 2005 – Carnival Liberty (110,000 GT) for Carnival Cruise Lines
- 2006 – MS Noordam (82,500 GT) for Holland America Line
- 2006 – Costa Serena (114,147 GT) for Costa Crociere
- 2006 – Carnival Freedom (110,000 GT) for Carnival Cruise Lines
- 2007 – Caio Duilio (D 554), a destroyer, for the Italian Navy
- 2007 – MS Eurodam (86,700 GT) for Holland America Line
- 2007 – MS Queen Victoria (90,000 GT) for Cunard Line
- 2007 – Carnival Splendor (110,000 GT) for Carnival Cruise Lines
- 2007 – MV Ventura (116,017 GT) for P&O Cruises
- 2008 – Ruby Princess (113,000 GT) for Princess Cruises
- 2008 – Costa Luminosa (92,700 GT) for Costa Crociere
- 2008 – Costa Pacifica (114,500 GT) for Costa Crociere
- 2009 – Carnival Dream (130,000 GT) for Carnival Cruise Lines
- 2009 – MS Nieuw Amsterdam (86,700 GT) for Holland America Line
- 2009 – Costa Deliziosa (92,700 GT) for Costa Crociere
- 2009 – MS Azura (115,055 GT) for P&O Cruises
- 2010 – MS Queen Elizabeth (90,901 GT) for Cunard Line
- 2010 – Costa Favolosa (114,500 GT) for Costa Crociere
- 2010 – Carnival Magic (130,000 GT) for Carnival Cruise Lines
- 2011 – Costa Fascinosa (114,500 GT) for Costa Crociere
- 2012 – Carnival Breeze (130,000 GT) for Carnival Cruise Lines
- 2013 – MS Royal Princess (143,700 GT) for Princess Cruises
- 2014 – MS Regal Princess (143,700 GT) for Princess Cruises
- 2014 – Costa Diadema (132,500 GT) for Costa Crociere
- 2015 – MV Britannia (145,000 GT) for P&O Cruises
- 2015 – Le Lyrial (10,944 GT) for Compagnie du Ponant
- 2015 – MV Viking Star (47,800 GT) for Viking Ocean Cruises
- 2016 – MV Seabourn Encore (40,350 GT) for Seabourn
- 2016 – Seven Seas Explorer (54,000 GT) for Regent Seven Seas Cruises
- 2016 – MV Viking Sea (47,800 GT) for Viking Ocean Cruises
- 2016 – MS Koningsdam (99,500 GT) for Holland America Line
- 2016 – Carnival Vista (135,500 GT) for Carnival Cruise Lines
- 2017 – MV Viking Sky (47,800 GT) for Viking Ocean Cruises
- 2017 – Majestic Princess (143,700 GT) for Princess Cruises
- 2017 – MSC Seaside (153,516 GT) for MSC Cruises
- 2017 – MV Viking Sun (47,800 GT) for Viking Ocean Cruises
- 2018 – MV Seabourn Ovation (40,350 GT) for Seabourn
- 2018 – MS Nieuw Statendam (99,500 GT) for Holland America Line
- 2018 – Carnival Horizon (135,500 GT) for Carnival Cruise Lines
- 2018 – MV Viking Orion (47,800 GT) for Viking Ocean Cruises
- 2018 – MSC Seaview (153,516 GT) for MSC Cruises
- 2019 – Sky Princess (143,700 GT) for Princess Cruises
- 2019 – Carnival Panorama (133,500 GT) for Carnival Cruise Line
- 2019 – MV Viking Jupiter (47,800 GT) for Viking Ocean Cruises
- 2020 – Costa Firenze (135,500 GT) for Costa Crociere
- 2020 – Enchanted Princess (143.700 GT) for Princess Cruises
- 2020 – Scarlet Lady (110,000 GT) for Virgin Voyages
- 2021 – MSC Seashore (169,380 GT) for MSC Cruises
- 2021 – MV Viking Venus (47,800 GT) for Viking Ocean Cruises
- 2021 – Valiant Lady (110,000 GT) for Virgin Voyages
- 2021 – MS Rotterdam (2020) (99,000 GT) Holland America Line
- 2022 – MV Mark W. Barker (26,000 GT) Interlake Steamship Company
- 2022 – Resilient Lady (110,000 GT) for Virgin Voyages
- 2022 – MSC Seascape (169,380 GT) for MSC Cruises
- 2022 – MV Viking Mars (47,800 GT) for Viking Ocean Cruises
- 2022 – Norwegian Prima (140,000 GT) for Norwegian Cruise Line
- 2022 – MV Viking Neptune (47,800 GT) for Viking Ocean Cruises
- 2023 – Norwegian Viva (140,000 GT) for Norwegian Cruise Line
- 2023 – MV Viking Saturn (47,800 GT) for Viking Ocean Cruises
- 2023 – Vista (67,000 GT) for Oceania Cruises
- 2023 – Explora I (63,000 GT) for Explora Journeys
- 2024 – Sun Princess (178,000 GT) for Princess Cruises
- 2024 – MV Viking Vela (53,700 GT) for Viking Ocean Cruises
- 2024 – Queen Anne (113,000 GT) for Cunard Line
- 2024 – Explora II (63,000 GT) for Explora Journeys
- 2025 – Mein Schiff Relax (160,000 GT) for TUI Cruises
- 2025 – Star Princess (178,000 GT) for Princess Cruises
- 2026 – Mein Schiff Flow (160,000 GT) for TUI Cruises

== List of shipyards ==
As of 2025, Fincantieri operates the following shipyards and dry docks:

- (Italy) Trieste shipyards (located at Trieste)
- (Italy) Monfalcone shipyards (located at Monfalcone, Gorizia)
- (Italy) Marghera shipyards (located at Marghera, Venice)
- (Italy) Muggiano shipyards (located at La Spezia)
- (Italy) Riva Trigoso shipyards (located at Sestri Levante, Genova)
- (Italy) Sestri Ponente shipyards (located at Genova)
- (Italy) Ancona shipyards (located at Ancona)
- (Italy) Castellammare di Stabia shipyards (located at Castellammare di Stabia, Napoli)
- (Italy) Palermo shipyards (located at Palermo)
- (Norway) VARD Brattvåg shipyard
- (Norway) VARD Langsten shipyards
- (Norway) VARD Søviknes Shipyard
- (Romania) VARD Brăila shipyards
- (Romania) VARD Tulcea shipyards
- (Brazil) VARD Promar shipyard
- (Vietnam) VARD Vũng Tàu shipyard
- (United States) Marinette Marine (located at Marinette, Wisconsin)
- (United States) Bay Shipbuilding Company (located at Sturgeon Bay, Wisconsin)
- (United States) ACE Marine (located at Green Bay, Wisconsin)

== Group structure ==
The Fincantieri Group mainly consists of the following companies, organized by business area:

=== Cruise and ferry ===
- Fincantieri S.p.A.
- Fincantieri Services USA LLC (100%)
- ACE Marine LLC (87.44%)
- Fincantieri India Pte Ltd. (100%)
- Fincantieri USA Inc. (100%)
- Fincantieri Arabia for Naval Services LLC (100%)
- Fincantieri (Shanghai) Trading Co. Ltd. (100%)
- Etihad Ship Building LLC (35%)
- Fincantieri Naval Services – Sole Proprietorship LLC (100%)
- MTM S.c.a.r.l. (41%)

=== Military ships ===
- Fincantieri S.p.A.
- Orizzonte Sistemi Navali S.p.A. (51%)
- Fincantieri Marine Group Holdings Inc. (87.44%)
- Fincantieri Marine Group LLC (87.44%)
- Marinette Marine Corporation LLC (87.44%)
- Naviris S.p.A. (50%)
- Fincantieri Services Doha LLC (100%)
- Maestral (50%)

=== Ship interiors ===
- Marine Interiors Cabins S.p.A. (100%)
- Marine Interiors S.p.A. (100%)
- Seanergy a Marine Interiors company S.r.l. (80%)
- MI S.p.A. (100%)
- OPERAE a Marine Interiors Company S.r.l. (85%)
- Vard Interiors AS (98.38%)

=== Offshore and specialized vessels ===
- Fincantieri S.p.A.
- Fincantieri Oil&Gas S.p.A. (100%)
- Vard Group AS (98.38%)
- Vard Promar SA (98.38%)
- Vard Vung Tau Ltd. (98.38%)
- Vard Shipyards Romania SA (98.38%)
- Vard Design AS (98.38%)
- Vard Marine Inc. (98.38%)

=== Underwater ===
- Fincantieri S.p.A.
- Remazel Engineering S.p.A. (100%)
- WASS Submaryne Systems (100%)

=== Equipment, systems and infrastructure ===
- Fincantieri S.p.A.
- Fincantieri NexTech S.p.A. (100%)
- Issel Nord S.r.l. (100%)
- Cetena S.p.A. (86,10%)
- E-PHORS S.p.A. (100%)
- IDS Ingegneria Dei Sistemi S.p.A. (100%)
- HMS IT S.p.A. (100%)
- S.L.S. - Support Logistic Services S.r.l. (100%)
- Vard Electro AS (98,38%)
- Isotta Fraschini Motori S.p.A. (100%)
- Fincantieri SI S.p.A. (100%)
- Power4Future S.p.A. (52%)
- FINMESA S.c.a.r.l. (50%)
- Seaonics AS (98.38%)
- Team Turbo Machines S.A.S. (100%)
- BOP6 S.c.a.r.l. (100%)
- Fincantieri Infrastructure S.p.A. (100%)
- Fincantieri Infrastructure Opere Marittime S.p.A. (100%)
- Fincantieri Infrastructure Florida Inc. (100%)
- Fincantieri Infrastrutture Sociali S.p.A. (90%)
- SOF S.p.A. (90%)

== Financial data ==
Year	Revenue (millions of €)	EBITDA (millions of €)	Net income (millions of €)	Net financial position (millions of €)	Equity (millions of €)	Investments (millions of €)	Order backlog (millions of €)	Ships delivered	Employees
2025	9,194	681	117	1,872	987	389	54,849	24	24,370
2024	8,128	509	33	1,281	845	263	43,522	26	22,588
2023	7,651	397	−53	2,271	434	258	34,629	26	21,215
2022	7,482	221	−309	2,531	587	295	34,591	19	20,792
2021	6,911	495	22	−859	834	358	36,339	19	20,774
2020	5,879	314	−240	−1,062	777	309	36,770	19	20,150
2019	5,849	320	−141	−736	1,050	279	37,127	26	19,823
2018	5,474	414	72	−494	1,253	161	32,743	35	19,274
2017	5,020	341	57	−314	1,309	163	28,482	25	19,545
2016	4,429	267	25	−615	1,241	224	24,003	26	19,181
2015	4,183	−26	−175	−438	1,266	161	22,061	21	20,019

== Shareholders ==
The main shareholders as of 2025 are:

- CDP Equity S.p.A. - 64.24%
- Market - 35.62%
- Treasury shares - 0.14%

== See also ==
- List of ships built by Fincantieri
- Isotta Fraschini
- Cantieri Riuniti dell'Adriatico
- WASS Submarine Systems
