= Italian ship San Giorgio (L 9892) =

San Giorgio-class landing platform dock

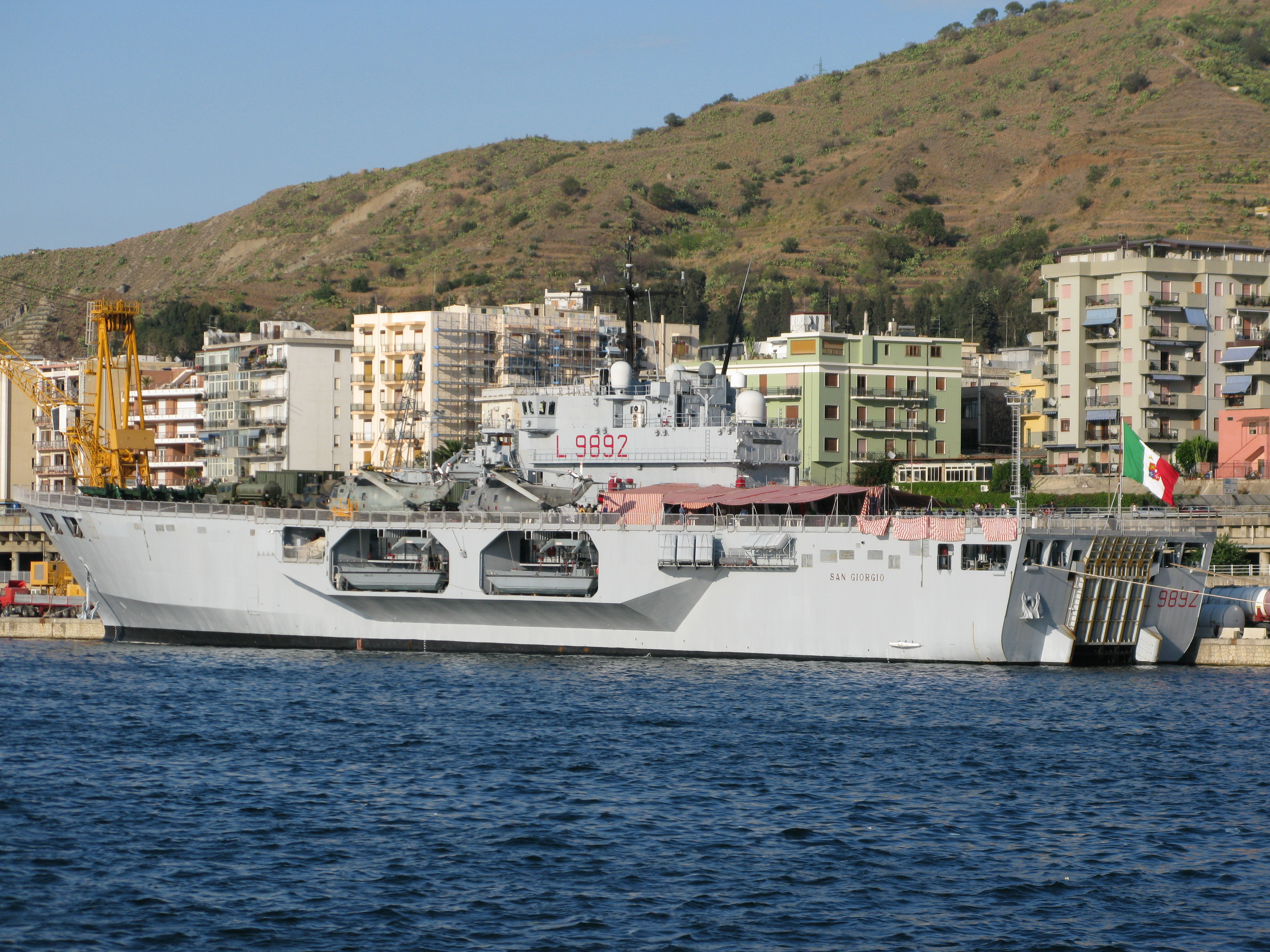
- San Giorgio on 28 September 2008

History

Italy
- Name: San Giorgio
- Namesake: San Giorgio
- Builder: Fincantieri, Riva Trigoso
- Laid down: 27 May 1985
- Launched: 21 February 1987
- Commissioned: 13 February 1988
- Home port: Brindisi
- Identification: MMSI number: 247971000; Callsign: IARG; Pennant number: L 9892
- Motto: Arremba San Zorzo
- Status: Active

General characteristics
- Class & type: San Giorgio-class amphibious transport dock
- Displacement: 8,000 t (7,900 long tons) for San Giusto (full load)
- Length: 133 m (436 ft 4 in)
- Beam: 20.5 m (67 ft 3 in)
- Propulsion: - 2 × diesel engines Grandi Motori Trieste GMT A 420.12, 6,264 kW (8,400 hp) each; - 4 × diesel engine generators Grandi Motori Trieste GMT B230.6, 770 kW (1,030 hp) each
- Speed: 21 knots (39 km/h; 24 mph)
- Range: 7,500 nmi (13,900 km; 8,600 mi) at 16 knots (30 km/h; 18 mph)
- Boats & landing craft carried: - 3 × LCM62-class LCM; - 3 × MTP96-class LCVP; - 1 × patrol craft
- Capacity: 350 troops with 30 medium tanks or 36 tracked armoured vehicles
- Complement: 17 officers, 163 ratings
- Sensors & processing systems: - SMA MM/SPQ 702 search radar; - GEM Elettronica navigation radar: MM/SPN-748 then MM/SPN-753(V)9 and now dual band radar (X/Ka) MM/SPN-760(V)1; - Selex ES RTN-10X fire control radar
- Electronic warfare & decoys: Elettronica SpA INS-3 ECM/ESM suite
- Armament: 2 × OTO Melara KBA 25/80 mm guns
- Aircraft carried: 3 × AW-101, 5 × Agusta Bell AB-212 helicopters or 18 SH90A
- Aviation facilities: Flight deck

San Giorgio (L 9892) is the lead ship of the San Giorgio-class amphibious transport dock of the Italian Navy.

== Development and design ==
The San Giorgio class of the Italian Navy, also known as the Santi class (since the three units that compose it have the names of three saints), consists of three amphibious warships of the amphibious transport dock type: the San Giorgio, the San Marco and lastly, with a slightly different design, the San Giusto, specialized in landing operations that replaced the Grado and Caorle which were disarmed at the end of the 1980s. They are included in the Projection Force from the Sea, the amphibious component of the Italian Armed Forces.

== Construction and career ==
San Giorgio was laid down on 27 May 1985 and launched on 21 February 1987 by Fincantieri at Riva Trigoso. She was commissioned on 13 February 1988.

Starting from December 1992 the San Giorgio, San Marco and the men of the San Marco Battalion took part in Somalia in the Ibis I and Ibis II missions with the 24th Naval Group together with Vittorio Veneto, Vesuvius and Grecale and with the 25th Naval Group together with the Giuseppe Garibaldi, the Stromboli and Scirocco.

In mid-2006, the Italian Navy was one of the first to intervene in the Lebanon War. Participating in Operation Mimosa '06 and subsequently in Operation Leonte with the San Giusto, San Marco and San Giorgio in the front row together with Aliseo, Luigi Durand de la Penne and the aircraft carrier Giuseppe Garibaldi. The ships landed in the port of Beirut, under the control of the 1st San Marco Regiment, tons of material intended for the population, field kitchens, ambulances, generators for the production of electricity, pneumatic tents, tons of medicines and tons of food. The food intended for the non-combatant civilian population was made available by the Ministry of Foreign Affairs, the Civil Protection, the Italian Red Cross and the United Nations World Food Program.

In December 2014, she took part in the rescue operations of the Norman Atlantic, playing a decisive role in the success of the rescue operation.

On 3 August 2016, in addition to fighting smugglers and human traffickers, they have received two additional tasks: the training of the Libyan Coast Guard, the Libyan Navy and the control of the arms embargo towards Libya in accordance with the resolutions of the UN Security Council. Italy will play a decisive role, since the training will be under Italian guidance and will take place onboard San Giorgio, where the first stages of the training of the Libyan Navy will take place already in September.

Rear Admiral Frumento replaced his Greek counterpart Theodoros Mikropoulos who had been in command since October 19, 2020. He operated aboard the San Giorgio which became the new flagship.

== Gallery ==
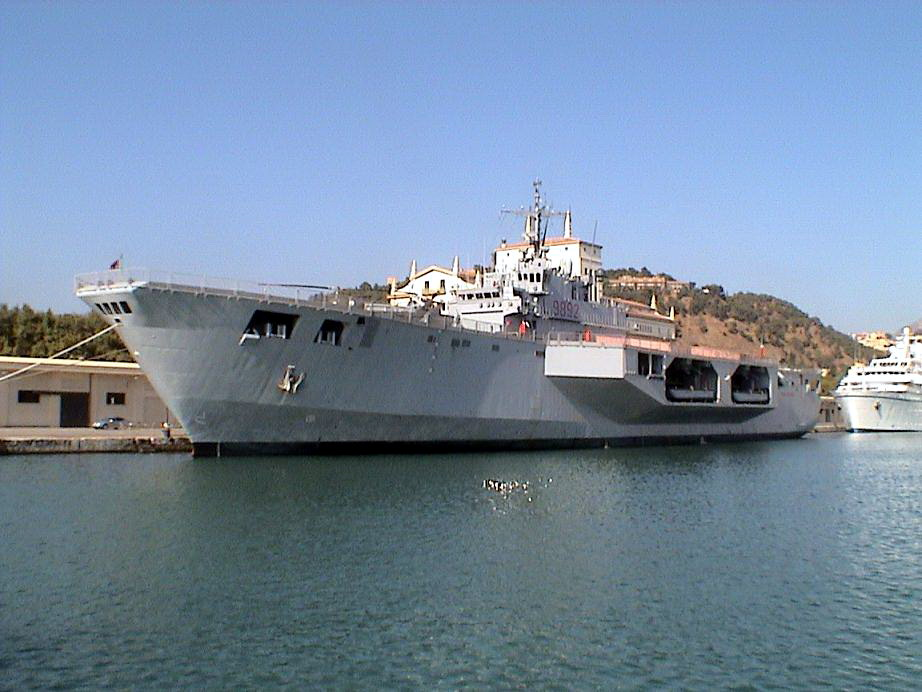
San Giorgio in Málaga in 2003.

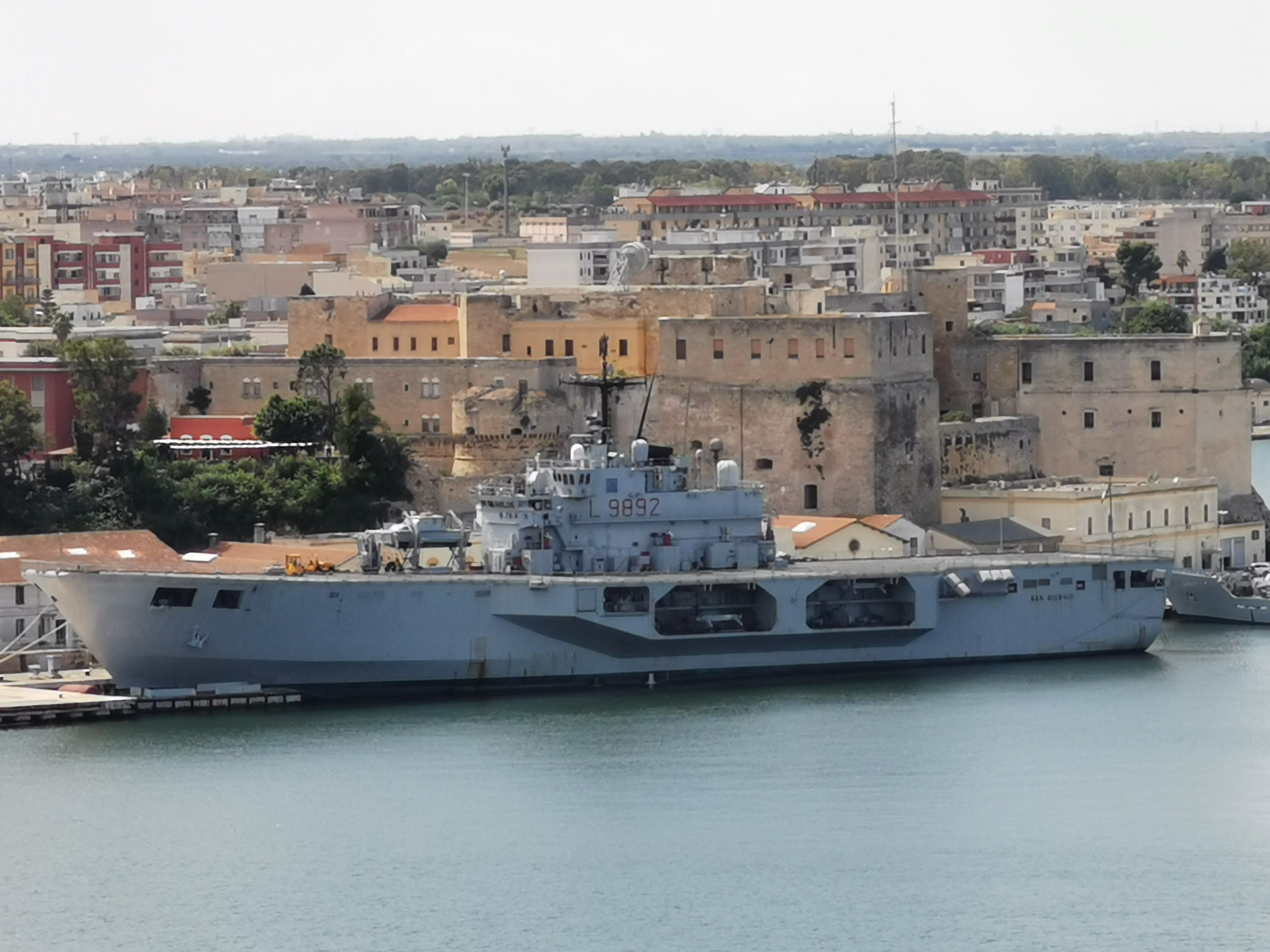
San Giorgio in Brindisi on 3 September 2020.
