= Italian ship San Marco (L 9893) =

San Giorgio-class landing platform dock

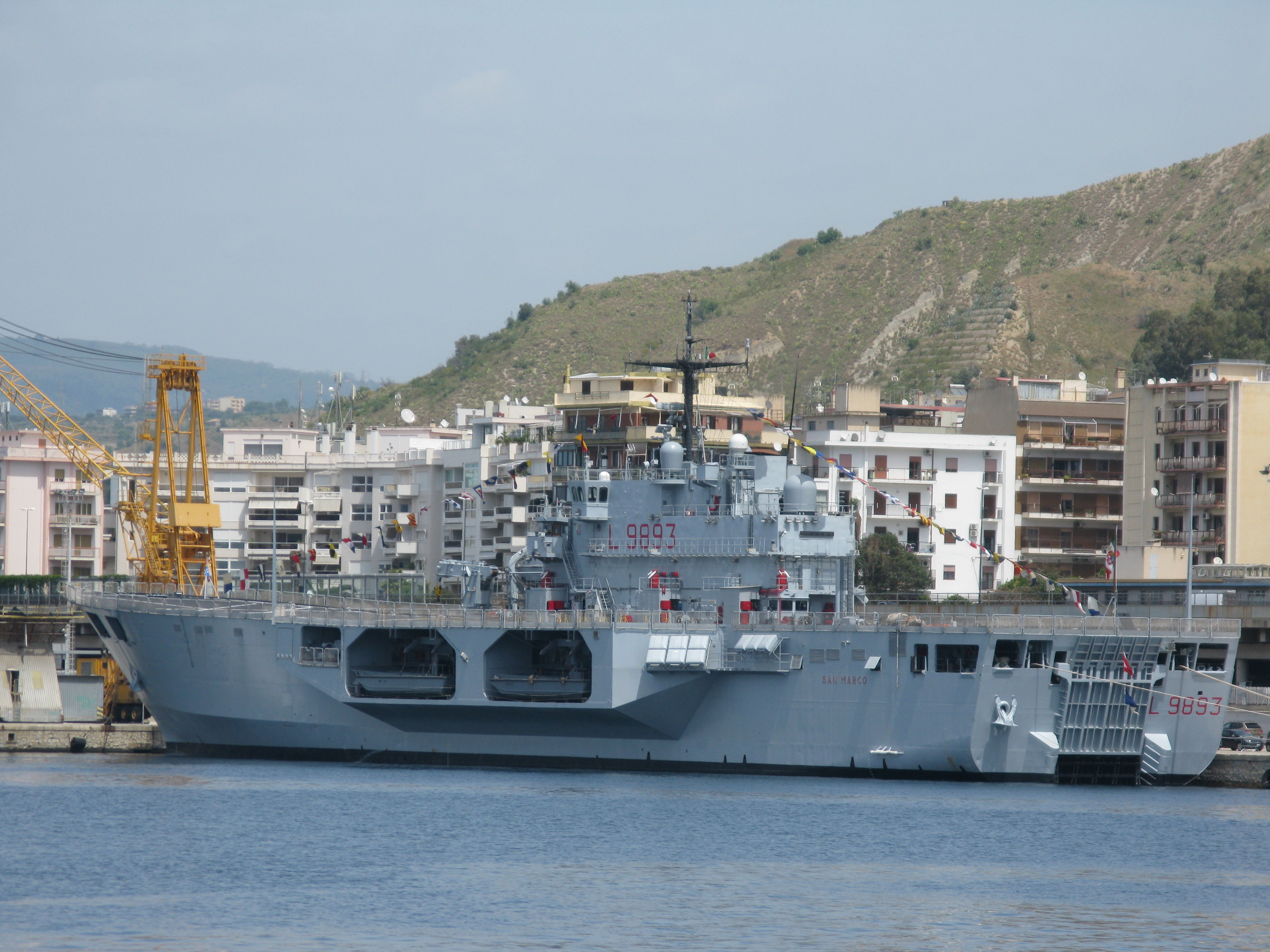
- San Marco on 22 April 2016

History

Italy
- Name: San Marco
- Namesake: San Marco
- Builder: Fincantieri, Riva Trigoso
- Laid down: 26 March 1985
- Launched: 10 October 1987
- Commissioned: 14 May 1988
- Home port: Brindisi
- Identification: Callsign: IARM; Pennant number: L 9893
- Motto: Ti con nu, nu con ti
- Status: Active

General characteristics
- Class & type: San Giorgio-class landing helicopter dock
- Displacement: - 7.960 t (7.834 long tons) full load; - 8.000 t (7.874 long tons) for San Giusto (full load)
- Length: 133 m (436 ft)
- Beam: 20.5 m (67 ft)
- Propulsion: - 2 × diesel engines Grandi Motori Trieste GMT A 420.12, 6,264 kW (8,400 hp) each; - 4 × diesel engine generators Grandi Motori Trieste GMT B230.6, 770 kW (1,030 hp) each
- Speed: 21 knots (39 km/h; 24 mph)
- Range: 7,500 nautical miles (13,900 km; 8,600 mi) at 16 knots (30 km/h; 18 mph)
- Boats & landing craft carried: - 3 × LCM62-class LCM; - 3 × MTP96-class LCVP; - 1 × patrol craft
- Capacity: 350 troops with 30 C1 Ariete or 36 Dardo IFV
- Complement: 17 officers, 163 ratings
- Sensors & processing systems: - SMA MM/SPQ 702 search radar; - GEM Elettronica navigation radar: MM/SPN-748 then MM/SPN-753(V)9 and now dual band radar (X/Ka) MM/SPN-760(V)1; - Selex ES RTN-10X fire control radar
- Electronic warfare & decoys: Elettronica SpA INS-3 ECM/ESM suite
- Armament: 2 × OTO Melara KBA 25/80 mm guns
- Aircraft carried: 3 × AW-101, 5 × Bell 212 helicopters or 18 NH90
- Aviation facilities: Flight deck

San Marco (L 9893) is the second ship of the San Giorgio-class landing platform dock of the Italian Navy.

== Development and design ==
The San Giorgio class of the Italian Navy, also known as the Santi class (since the three units that compose it have the names of three saints), consists of three amphibious warships of the landing platform dock (LPD) type: the San Giorgio, the San Marco and lastly, with a slightly different design, the San Giusto, specialized in landing operations that replaced the Grado and Caorle which were disarmed at the end of the 1980s. They are included in the Projection Force from the Sea, the amphibious component of the Italian Armed Forces.

== Construction and career ==
San Marco was laid down on 26 March 1985 and launched on 10 October 1987 by Fincantieri at Riva Trigoso. She was commissioned on 14 May 1988.

Starting from December 1992 the San Giorgio, San Marco and the men of the San Marco Battalion took part in Somalia in the Ibis I and Ibis II missions with the 24th Naval Group together with Vittorio Veneto, Vesuvius and Grecale and with the 25th Naval Group together with the Giuseppe Garibaldi, the Stromboli and Scirocco.

In the summer of 2006, the Navy was one of the first to intervene in the Lebanon War. Participating in Operation Mimosa '06 and subsequently in Operation Leonte with the San Giusto, San Marco and San Giorgio in the front row together with Aliseo, Luigi Durand de la Penne and the aircraft carrier Giuseppe Garibaldi. The ships have landed, in the port of Beirut, under the control of the 1st San Marco Regiment, tons of material intended for the population, field kitchens, ambulances, generators for the production of electricity, pneumatic tents, tons of medicines and tons of food. food intended for the non-combatant civilian population made available by the Ministry of Foreign Affairs, the Civil Protection, the Italian Red Cross and the United Nations World Food Program.

On 16 June 2016, San Marco, Bersagliere, Cigala Fulgosi, Andrea Doria, Carlo Margottini, Etna and Stromboli participated in the Flotta Verde exercise as part of the Great Green Fleet initiative. Operated alongside USS Dwight D. Eisenhower, USS San Jacinto and USS Roosevelt.

== Gallery ==
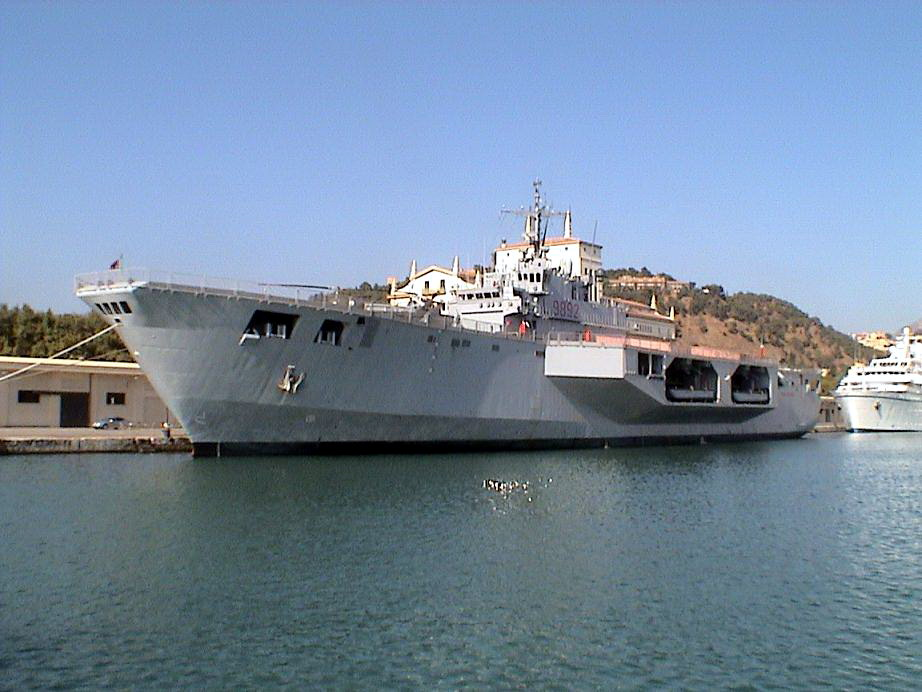
San Giorgio in Malaga in 2003.

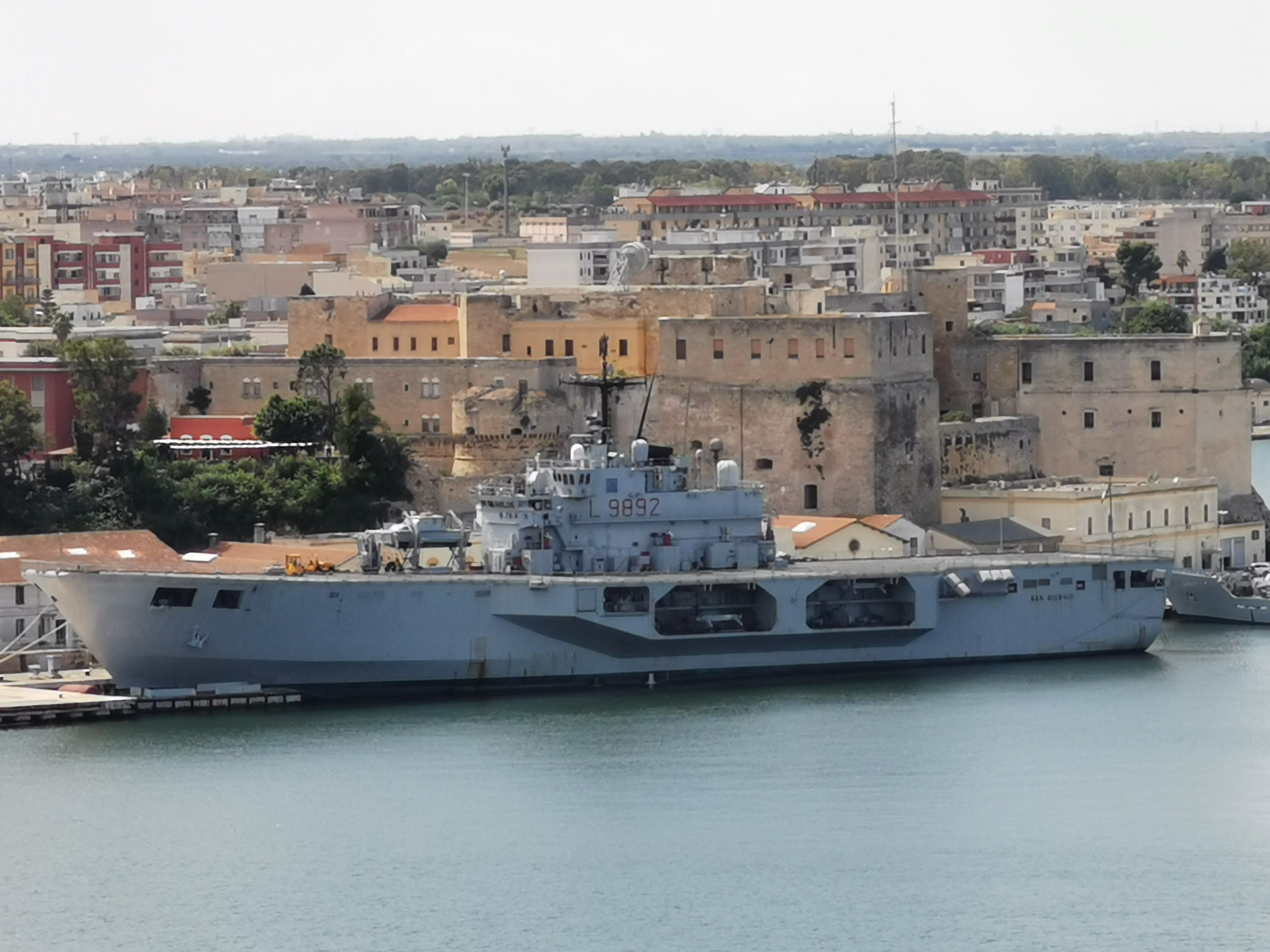
San Giorgio in Brindisi on 3 September 2020.
