= Italian ship Maestrale =

Maestrale has been borne by at least two ships of the Italian Navy and may refer to:

- Italian destroyer Maestrale, a Maestrale-class destroyer launched in 1934 and scuttled in 1943. Salved and partially repaired by Germany but scuttled again in 1945.
- Italian frigate Maestrale (F 570), a Maestrale-class frigate launched in 1981 and decommissioned in 2015.
