= Italian ship Aliseo =

Aliseo has been borne by at least three ships of the Italian Navy and may refer to:

- Italian patrol boat Aliseo, previously the Brazilian SS Voador purchased in 1916. She was discarded in 1920.
- Italian torpedo boat Aliseo, a Ciclone-class torpedo boat launched in 1942 and transferred to Yugoslavia as Biokovo in 1949.
- Italian frigate Aliseo (F 574), a Maestrale-class frigate launched in 1982.
