= Italian ship Grecale =

Grecale has been borne by at least two ships of the Italian Navy and may refer to:

- Italian destroyer Grecale, a Maestrale-class destroyer launched in 1934 and stricken in 1964.
- Italian frigate Grecale (F 571), a Maestrale-class frigate launched in 1981.
