= Italian ship Libeccio =

Libeccio has been borne by at least two ships of the Italian Navy and may refer to:

- Italian destroyer Libeccio, a Maestrale-class destroyer launched in 1934 and sunk in 1941.
- Italian frigate Libeccio (F 572), a Maestrale-class frigate launched in 1981.
