= Maurizio Gimignani =

Italian Navy officer

- Born: Grosseto, Italy
- Military career
- Allegiance: Italy
- Branch: Italian Navy
- Rank: Vice Admiral
- Commands: Deputy Chief of Staff of the Navy; 7th Frigate Squadron; Zeffiro; Longobardo; Romeo Romei; Nazario Sauro
- Conflicts: Operation Enduring Freedom

Vice Admiral Maurizio Gimignani is an Italian Navy officer, currently serving as Deputy Chief of Staff of the Italian Navy.

He qualified in submarines and commanded the submarines Longobardo, Romeo Romei and Nazario Sauro as well as the 1st Submarine Squadron. On promotion to captain he commanded the Maestrale-class frigate Zeffiro and the 7th Frigate Squadron.

He served as Commander of the Italian Navy Maritime Training Center as a rear admiral (lower half) and in 2001 led the Italian Naval group (COMGRUPNAVIT) supporting Operation Enduring Freedom.

He was promoted to rear admiral and appointed Commander of the High Sea Forces (COMFORAL) as well as Commander, Italian Maritime Forces (COMITMARFOR), part of NATO Force Maritime HQ. From 2005 to 2008 he served as Chief of Staff of the Italian Operational Joint Force Command (COIDIFESA).

He was promoted to vice admiral from 1 January 2008 and appointed Commander of Allied Maritime Component Command Naples (MARCOM) in June 2008. In 2011 he was appointed Deputy Chief of Staff of the Navy.
