= Surface warfare =

Military operations involving the use of surface warships

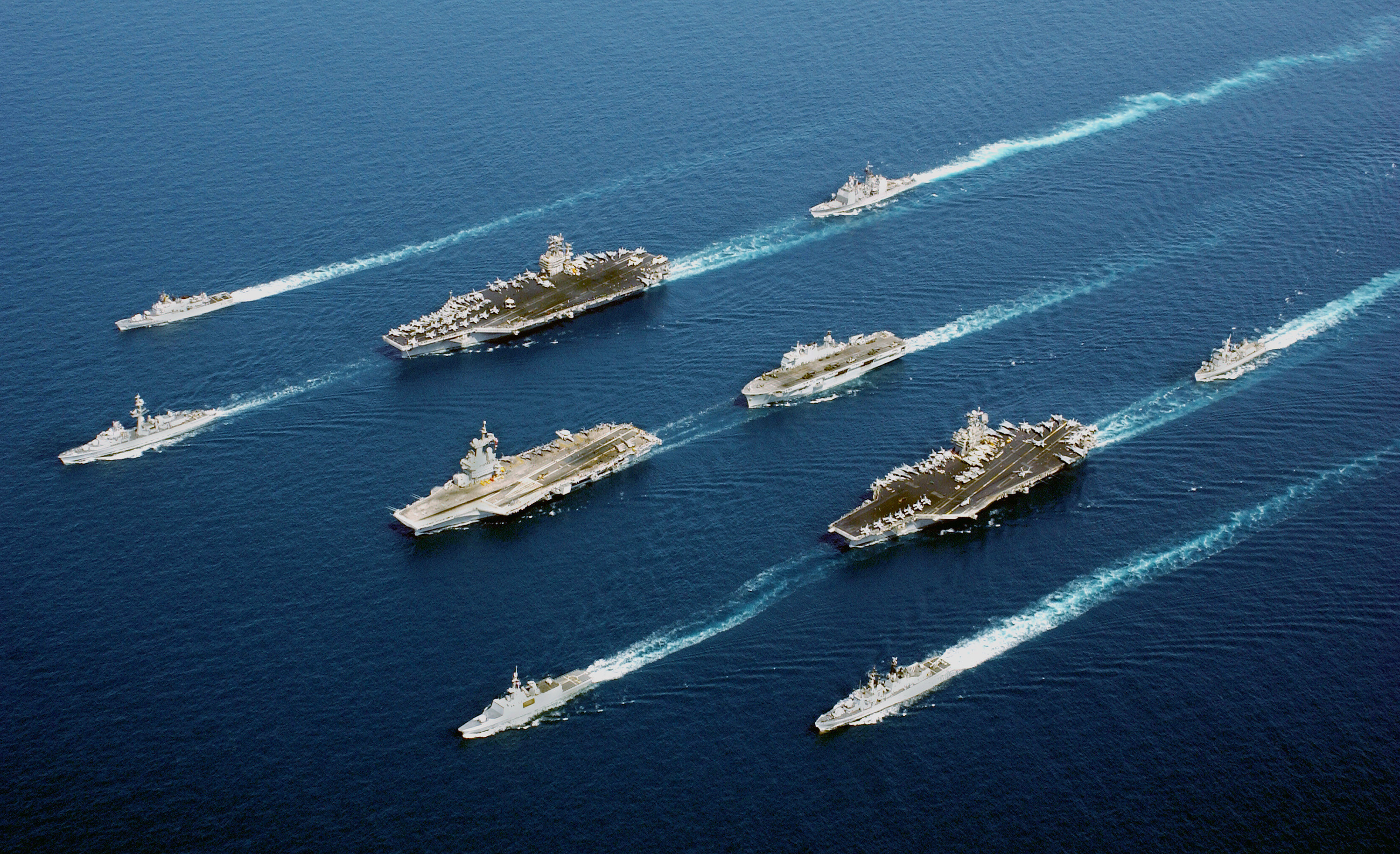
A rare occurrence of a 5-country multinational surface fleet, during Operation Enduring Freedom in the Oman Sea. In four descending columns, from left to right: Maestrale, De Grasse; USS John C. Stennis, Charles de Gaulle, Surcouf; USS Port Royal, HMS Ocean, USS John F. Kennedy, HNLMS Van Amstel; and Luigi Durand de la Penne.

Surface warfare is naval warfare involving surface ships. It is one of the four operational areas of naval warfare, the others being underwater warfare, aerial warfare, and information warfare. Surface warfare is the oldest and most basic form of naval warfare, though modern surface warfare doctrine originated in the mid-20th century.

== Description ==
Modern surface warfare dates from the mid-20th century, when surface, air, and submarine warfare components were blended together as a tactical unit to achieve strategic objectives. In United States Navy doctrine, the two most important strategic objectives are interdiction and sea control.

- Interdiction is the process of intercepting an enemy transiting through a location. For example, German naval objectives against Britain during World War II's Battle of the Atlantic were primarily focused on preventing ships from arriving intact with their cargoes.
- Sea control is the dominance of force over a given area that prevents other naval forces from operating successfully. For example, the mission of the Allied navies in the Atlantic during World War II was to maintain sea control and prevent Axis naval forces from operating. The Anti-access/area denial is an opposition to enemy's sea control without itself being an attempt to gain sea control.

Surface warfare (SuW) is conducted by a surface ship to eliminate a threat, which may include Anti-surface warfare (ASuW), anti-air warfare (AAW), anti-submarine warfare (ASW), naval gunfire support (NGFS), riverine operations, mine warfare, and electronic warfare.

In the second half of the 20th century, the importance of naval surface power was reduced as air and submarine warfare platforms demonstrated their capabilities, as in the Battle of Taranto, the Battle of Pearl Harbor, and the sinking of Prince of Wales and Repulse.

Following World War II, guided anti-ship missiles required new tactics and doctrines. Small, fast, relatively cheap missile boats became a threat for large ships, much more serious than previous torpedo boats, as in the War of Attrition, when Egyptian missile boats struck and sank the Israeli destroyer Eilat on 20 October 1967.

== Ships ==
Surface combatant ships include battleships, aircraft carriers, cruisers, destroyers, frigates, and others. Surface combatants also include mine warfare ships, amphibious command ships, coastal defense ships, amphibious assault ships, and many others. An important facet of naval warfare are however the support ships (that is, non-combat ships): freighters, oilers, hospital ships, tugs, troop transports, and other auxiliary ships. In the U.S. Navy model, now widespread in the world, various types of ships would be primarily organized into the carrier battle group.

== See also ==
- Naval warfare
- Naval tactics
