= Italian frigate Libeccio (F 572) =

Maestrale-class frigate

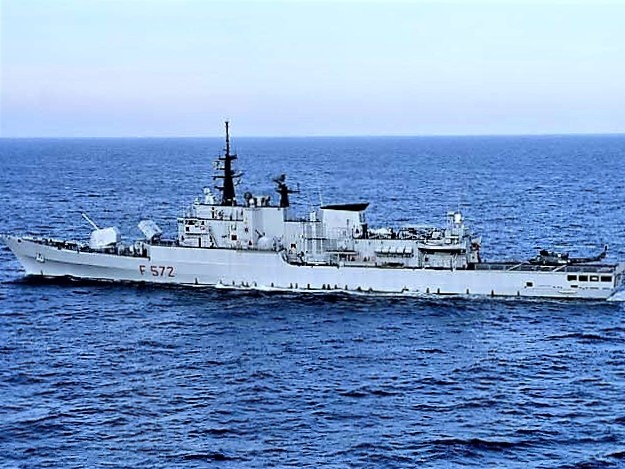
- Libeccio underway in 1980s.

History

Italy
- Name: Libeccio
- Namesake: Libeccio
- Operator: Italian Navy
- Builder: Fincantieri, Riva Trigoso shipyards
- Laid down: 1 August 1979
- Launched: 7 September 1981
- Commissioned: 5 February 1983
- Identification: Pennant number: F 572
- Motto: Paveant turbinem hostes; (Fear before the enemies of a whirlwind)
- Status: Decommissioned 2024

General characteristics
- Class & type: Maestrale-class frigate
- Displacement: 3.040 t (2.992 long tons), full load
- Length: - 122.7 m (403 ft) LOA; - 114 m (374 ft) LPP
- Beam: 12.9 m (42 ft)
- Draught: 4.2 m (14 ft)
- Propulsion: - CODOG scheme; - 2 × GE/Avio General Electric LM2500 gas turbines 18.380 kW (24.648 hp) each; - 2 × diesel engines Grandi Motori Trieste BL-230-20-DVM, 4.044 kW (5.423 hp) each; - 4 × diesel engine generators Grandi Motori Trieste A-236-SS, 780 kW (1,050 hp) each with Ansaldo generators; - 2 × 5-blade propellers
- Speed: 33 kn (61 km/h; 38 mph) (21 kn (39 km/h; 24 mph) on diesel)
- Range: 6,000 nmi (11,000 km; 6,900 mi) at 15 kn (28 km/h; 17 mph)
- Complement: 24 officers; 201 sailors
- Sensors & processing systems: - 1 × Selenia RAN-10S/SPS-774 surface and air surveillance radar; - 1 × Selenia SMA SPS-702 surface search radar; - 1 × Selenia SMA SPS-703 navigation radar (then replaced by one GEM Elettronica MM-SPN 753 Arpa); - 1 × Selenia SPG-75 fire control radar; - 2 × Selenia SPG-74 fire control radar (for Dardo); - 1 × Raytheon DE 1164, VDS sonar; - 1 × Raytheon DE 1160B, hull mounted sonar
- Electronic warfare & decoys: - (Elettronica Spa MM/SLQ-746) 2 × SLQ-D jammers; - 1 × ARBG-1A Saigon radio interceptor; - 1 × SLR-4 Newton intercept; - 2 × 20-round OTO Melara/Breda SCLAR decoy RL (Dagaie on Grecale); - 1 × AN/SLQ-25 Nixie towed acoustic torpedo system; - Prairie/Masker air-bubbler noise-suppression system
- Armament: - 4 × TESEO Mk-2 anti-ship missiles, double launchers; - 1 × Albatross octuple Aspide SAM launchers; - 1 × Otobreda 127 mm/54 gun; - 2 × Oto Melara Twin 40L70 DARDO CIWS; - 2 × Browning HB2B 12.7 mm; - 2 × MG 42/59 7.62 mm; - 2 × 533 mm torpedo tubes (Whitehead B-516, with Whitehead A-184 torpedoes: then removed); - 2 × 324 mm triple torpedo tubes (Whitehead ILAS-3) with Mk-46 Mod.2 torpedoes
- Aircraft carried: - flight deck 27 m (89 ft) x 12 m (39 ft) m; - 2 x AB-212 helicopters

Libeccio (F 572) is the third ship of the Maestrale-class frigate of the Italian Navy.

== Development ==
The Maestrale-class frigates were primarily designed for anti-submarine warfare (ASW), however the ships are highly flexible so they are also capable of anti-air and anti-surface operations. Ships of this class have been widely used in various international missions, either under NATO or UN flag, and during normal operations of the Italian Navy.

The first of these ships entered in service in early 1982. The rest of the fleet was launched over the next three years. The ships of the Maestrale class will be replaced by the Bergamini class.

== Construction and career ==
She was laid down on 1 August 1979 and launched on 7 September 1981 by Fincantieri shipyards. Commissioned on 5 February 1983 with the hull number F 572.

Libeccio underwent modernization in 2007 and again in 2010.

== Gallery ==
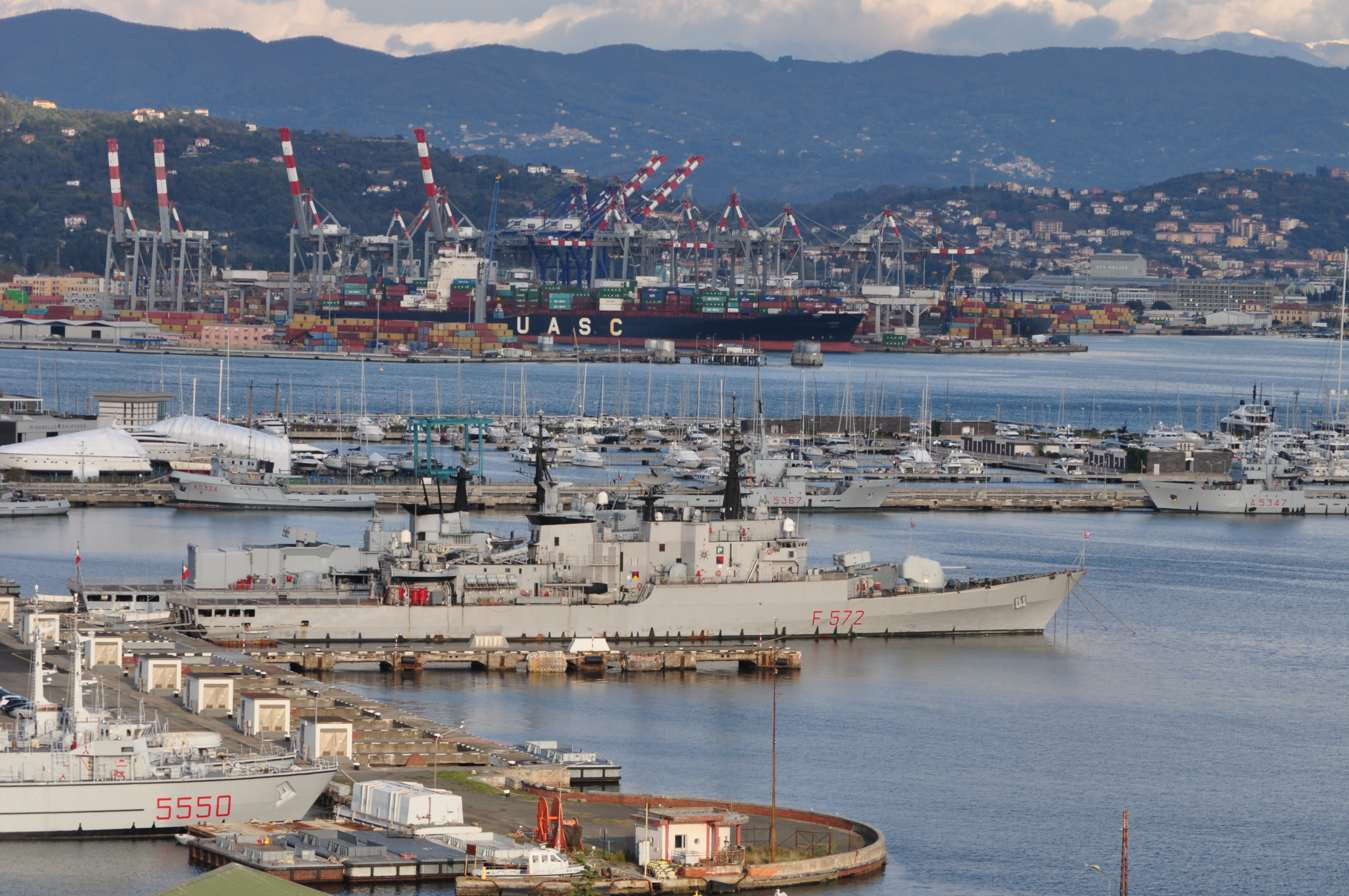
Libeccio docked at La Spezia naval base on 26 November 2015.

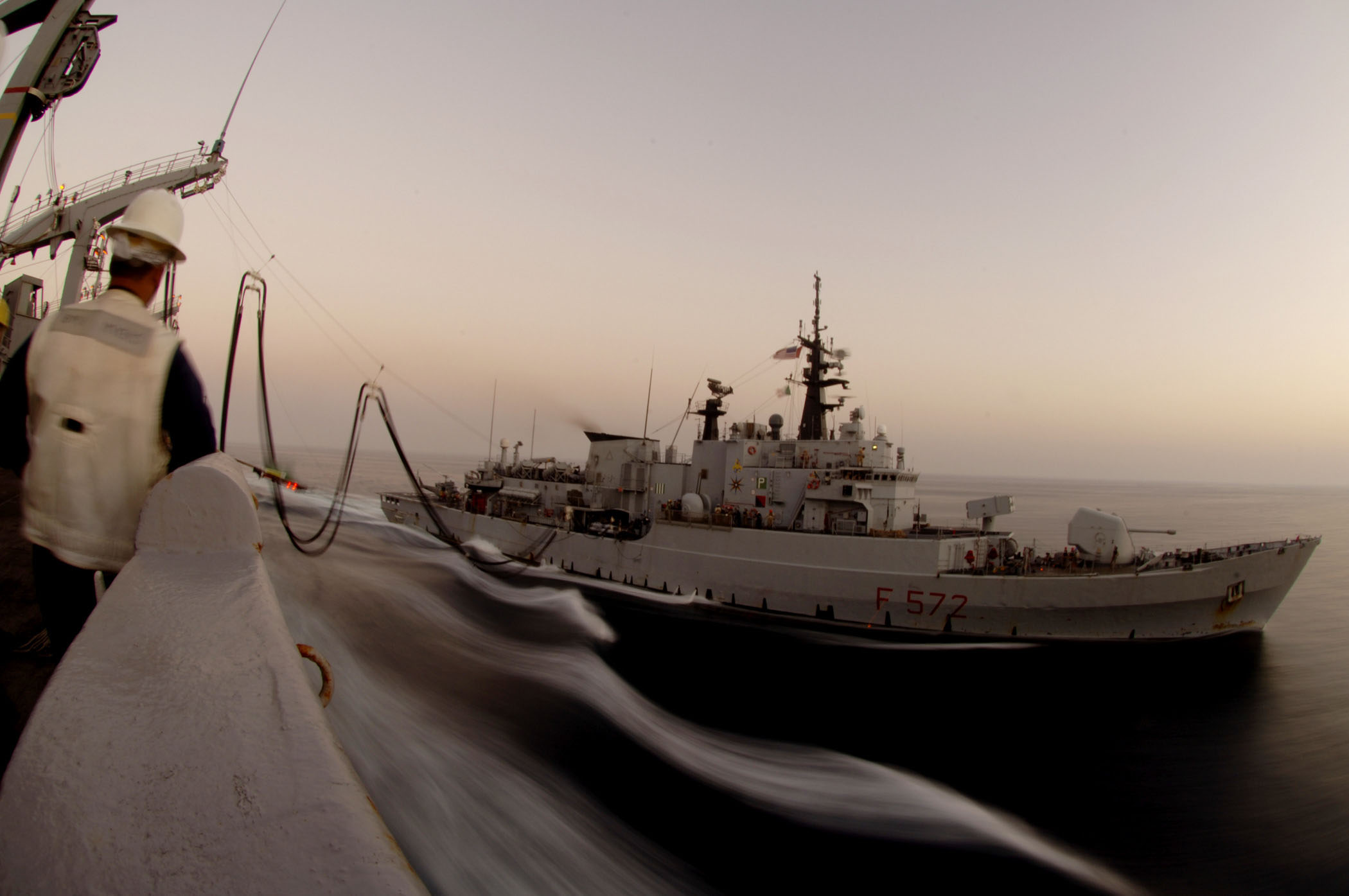
Libeccio replenish alongside USS Camden at Persian Gulf on 6 June 2005.

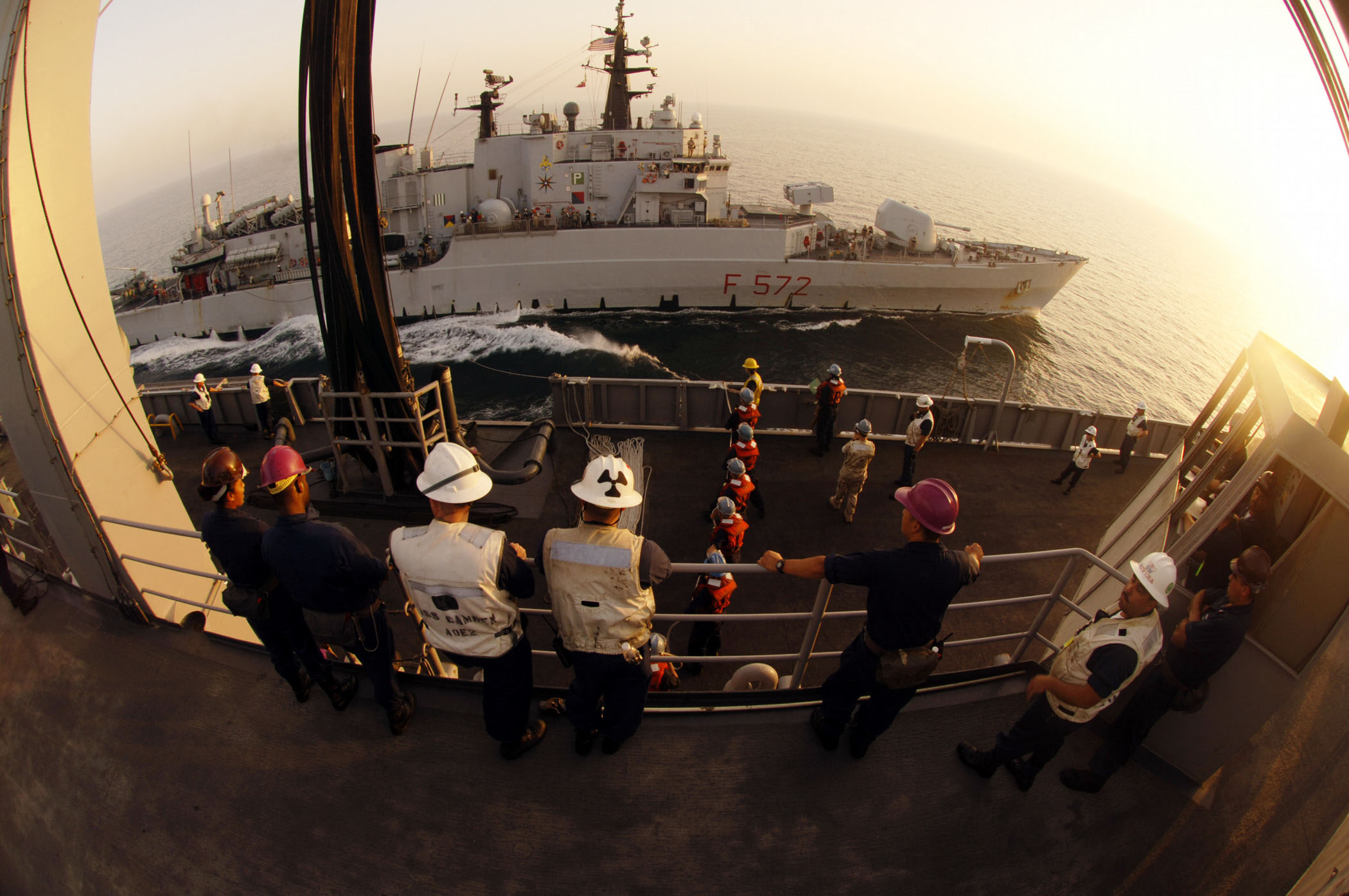
Libeccio replenish alongside USS Camden at Persian Gulf on 6 June 2005.

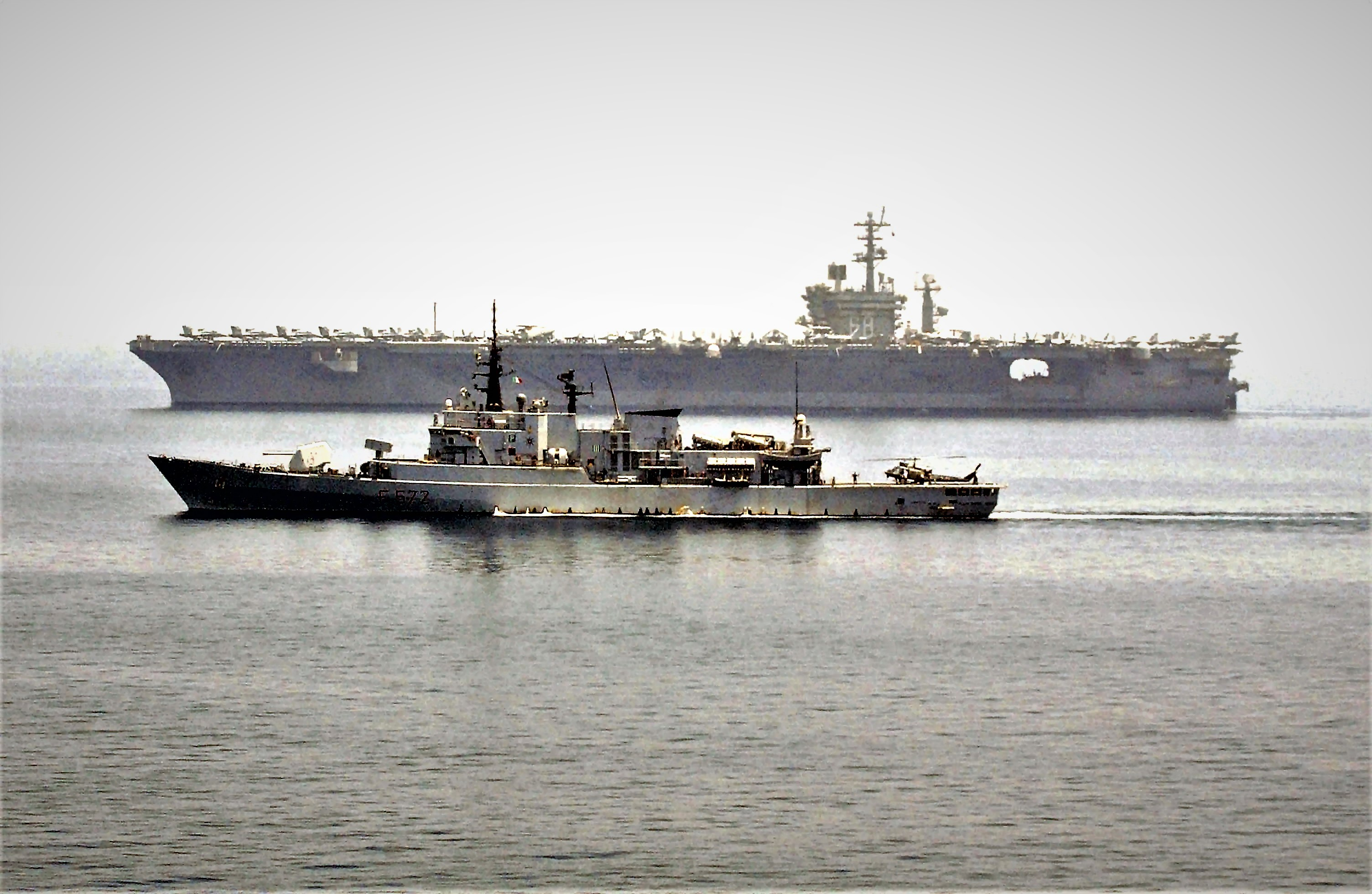
Libeccio alongside USS Nimitz 29 July 2005.
