= Italian frigate Scirocco =

Maestrale-class frigate

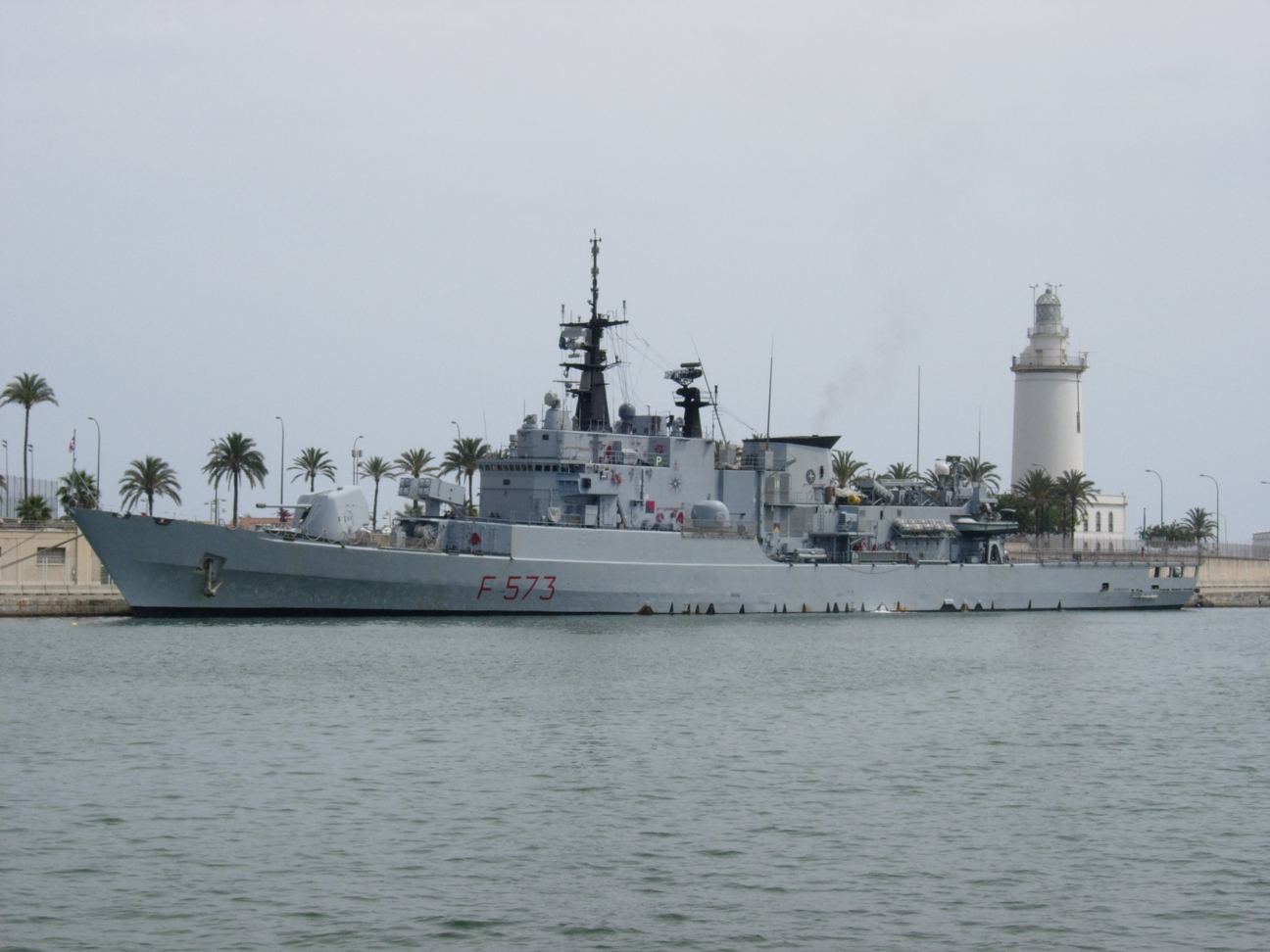
- Scirocco docked at Malaga in 2008.

History

Italy
- Name: Scirocco
- Namesake: Scirocco
- Operator: Italian Navy
- Builder: Fincantieri, Riva Trigoso shipyards
- Laid down: 26 February 1980
- Launched: 17 April 1982
- Commissioned: 20 September 1983
- Decommissioned: 20 February 2020
- Identification: Pennant number: F 573
- Motto: Acriter in hostes; (Harshly into the enemies)
- Fate: Scrapped in Aliaga Turkey 2024

General characteristics
- Class & type: Maestrale-class frigate
- Displacement: 3.040 t (2.992 long tons), full load
- Length: - 122.7 m (403 ft) LOA; - 114 m (374 ft) LPP
- Beam: 12.9 m (42 ft)
- Draught: 4.2 m (14 ft)
- Propulsion: - CODOG scheme; - 2 × GE/Avio General Electric LM2500 gas turbines 18.380 kW (24.648 hp) each; - 2 × diesel engines Grandi Motori Trieste BL-230-20-DVM, 4.044 kW (5.423 hp) each; - 4 × diesel engine generators Grandi Motori Trieste A-236-SS, 780 kW (1,050 hp) each with Ansaldo generators; - 2 × 5-blade propellers
- Speed: 33 kn (61 km/h; 38 mph) (21 kn (39 km/h; 24 mph) on diesel)
- Range: 6,000 nmi (11,000 km; 6,900 mi) at 15 kn (28 km/h; 17 mph)
- Complement: 24 officers; 201 sailors
- Sensors & processing systems: - 1 × Selenia RAN-10S/SPS-774 surface and air surveillance radar; - 1 × Selenia SMA SPS-702 surface search radar; - 1 × Selenia SMA SPS-703 navigation radar (then replaced by one GEM Elettronica MM-SPN 753 Arpa); - 1 × Selenia SPG-75 fire control radar; - 2 × Selenia SPG-74 fire control radar (for Dardo); - 1 × Raytheon DE 1164, VDS sonar; - 1 × Raytheon DE 1160B, hull mounted sonar
- Electronic warfare & decoys: - (Elettronica Spa MM/SLQ-746) 2 × SLQ-D jammers; - 1 × ARBG-1A Saigon radio interceptor; - 1 × SLR-4 Newton intercept; - 2 × 20-round OTO Melara/Breda SCLAR decoy RL (Dagaie on Grecale); - 1 × AN/SLQ-25 Nixie towed acoustic torpedo system; - Prairie/Masker air-bubbler noise-suppression system
- Armament: - 4 × TESEO Mk-2 anti-ship missiles, double launchers; - 1 × Albatross octuple Aspide SAM launchers; - 1 × Otobreda 127 mm/54 gun; - 2 × Oto Melara Twin 40L70 DARDO CIWS; - 2 × Browning HB2B 12.7 mm; - 2 × MG 42/59 7.62 mm; - 2 × 533 mm torpedo tubes (Whitehead B-516, with Whitehead A-184 torpedoes: then removed); - 2 × 324 mm triple torpedo tubes (Whitehead ILAS-3) with Mk-46 Mod.2 torpedoes
- Aircraft carried: - flight deck 27 m (89 ft) x 12 m (39 ft) m; - 2 x AB-212 helicopters

Scirocco (F 573) is the fourth ship of the Maestrale-class frigate of the Italian Navy.

== Development ==
The Maestrale-class frigates were primarily designed for anti-submarine warfare (ASW), however the ships are highly flexible so they are also capable of anti-air and anti-surface operations. Ships of this class have been widely used in various international missions, either under NATO or UN flag, and during normal operations of the Italian Navy.

The first of these ships entered in service in early 1982. The rest of the fleet was launched over the next three years. The ships of the Maestrale class will be replaced by the Bergamini class.

== Construction and career ==
She was laid down on 26 February 1980 and launched on 17 April 1982 by Fincantieri shipyards. Commissioned on 20 September 1983 with the hull number F 573. She was decommissioned on 20 February 2020 and scrapped in Aliaga Turkey in 2024.

== Gallery ==
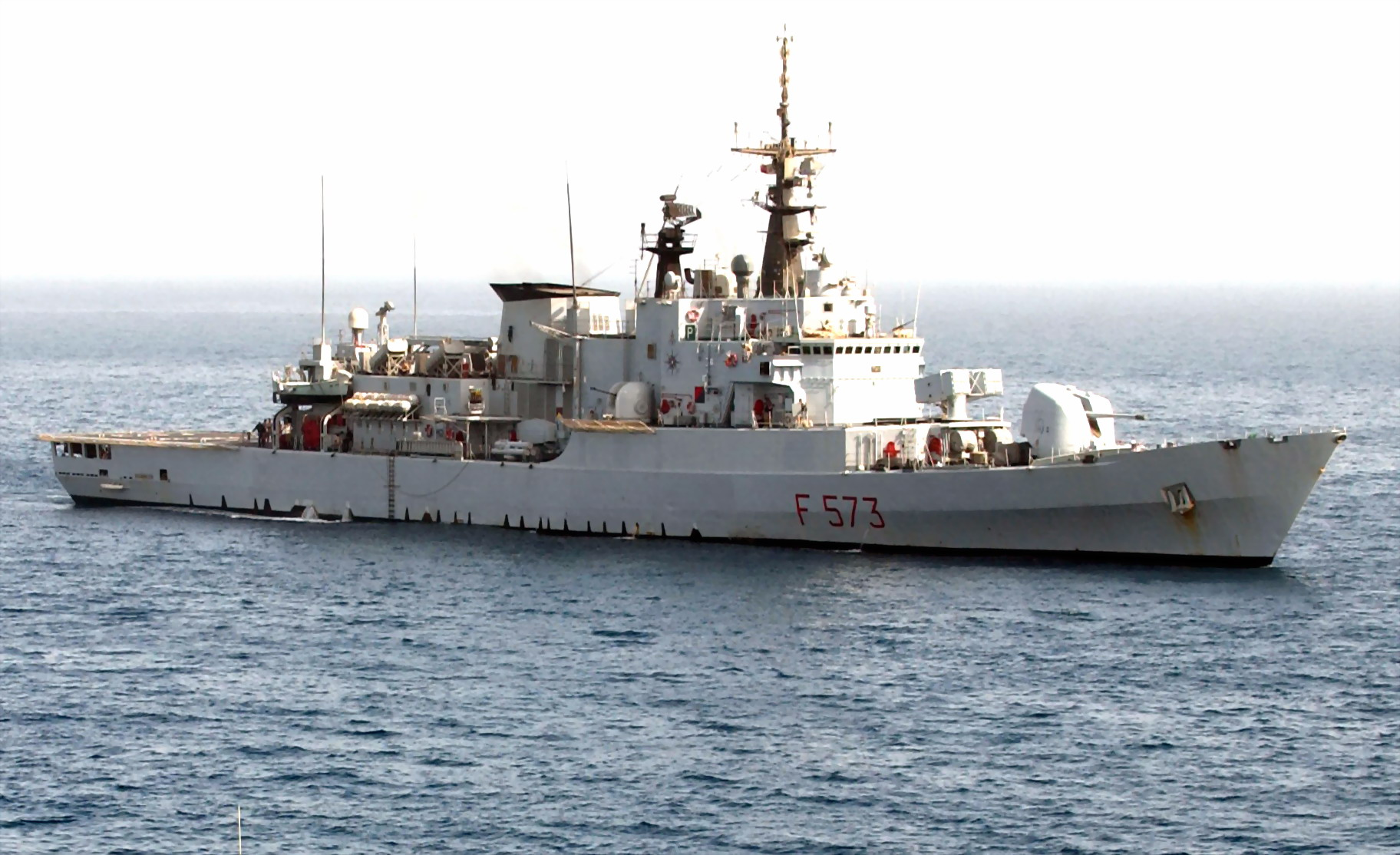
Scirocco off the Gulf of Oman on 3 May 2004.

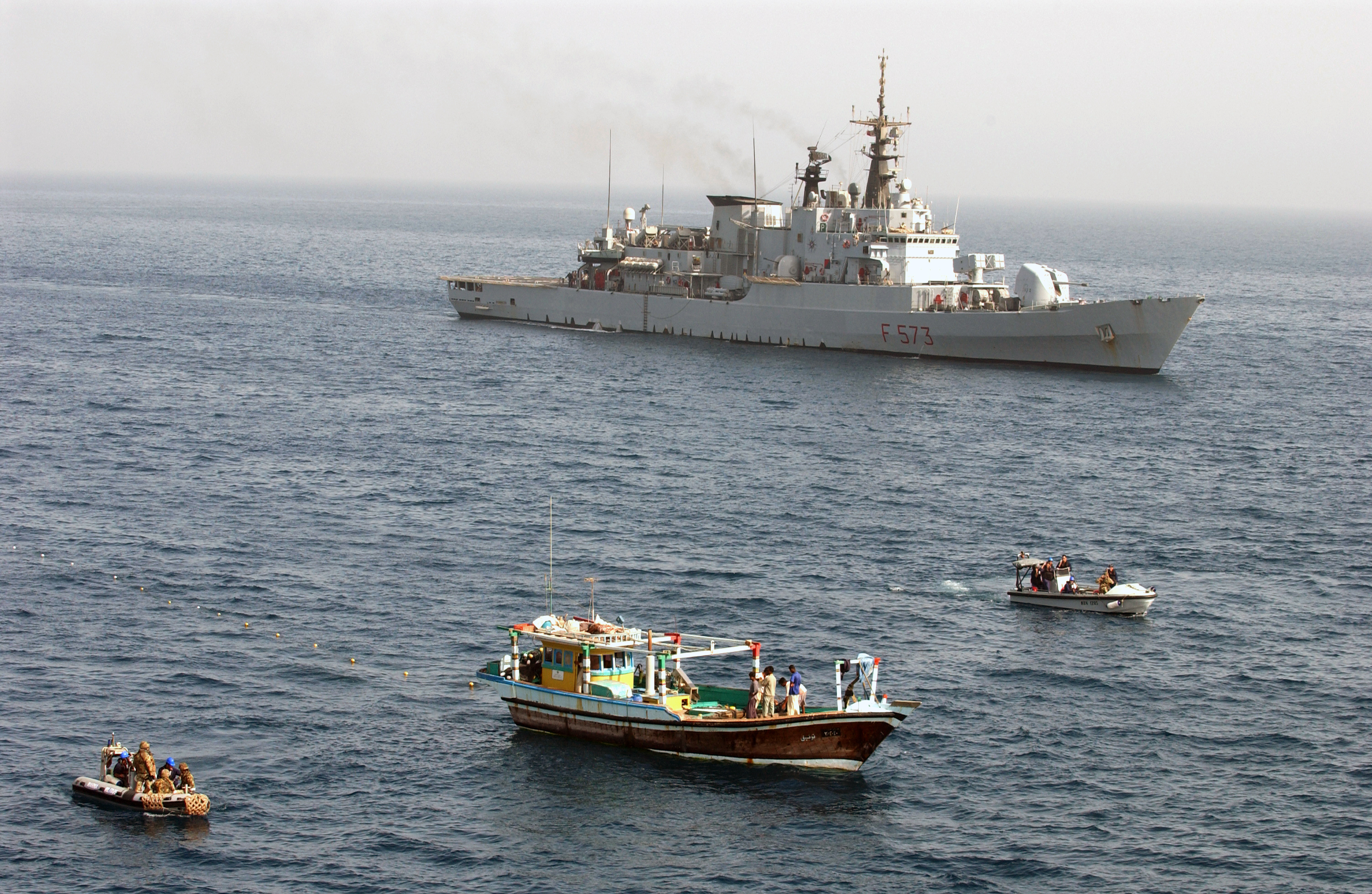
Scirocco off the Gulf of Oman on 3 May 2004.

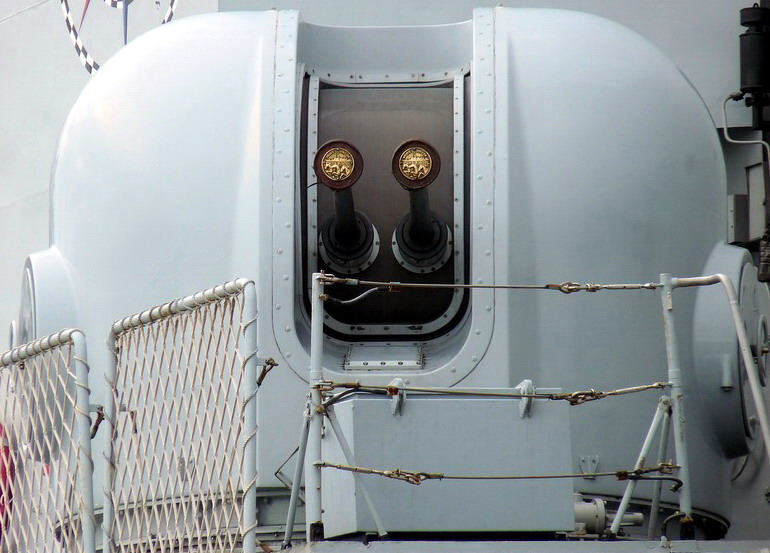
Scirocco’s Dardo CIWS on 9 November 2008.
