= Italian ship San Giusto =

1993 San Giorgio-class warship

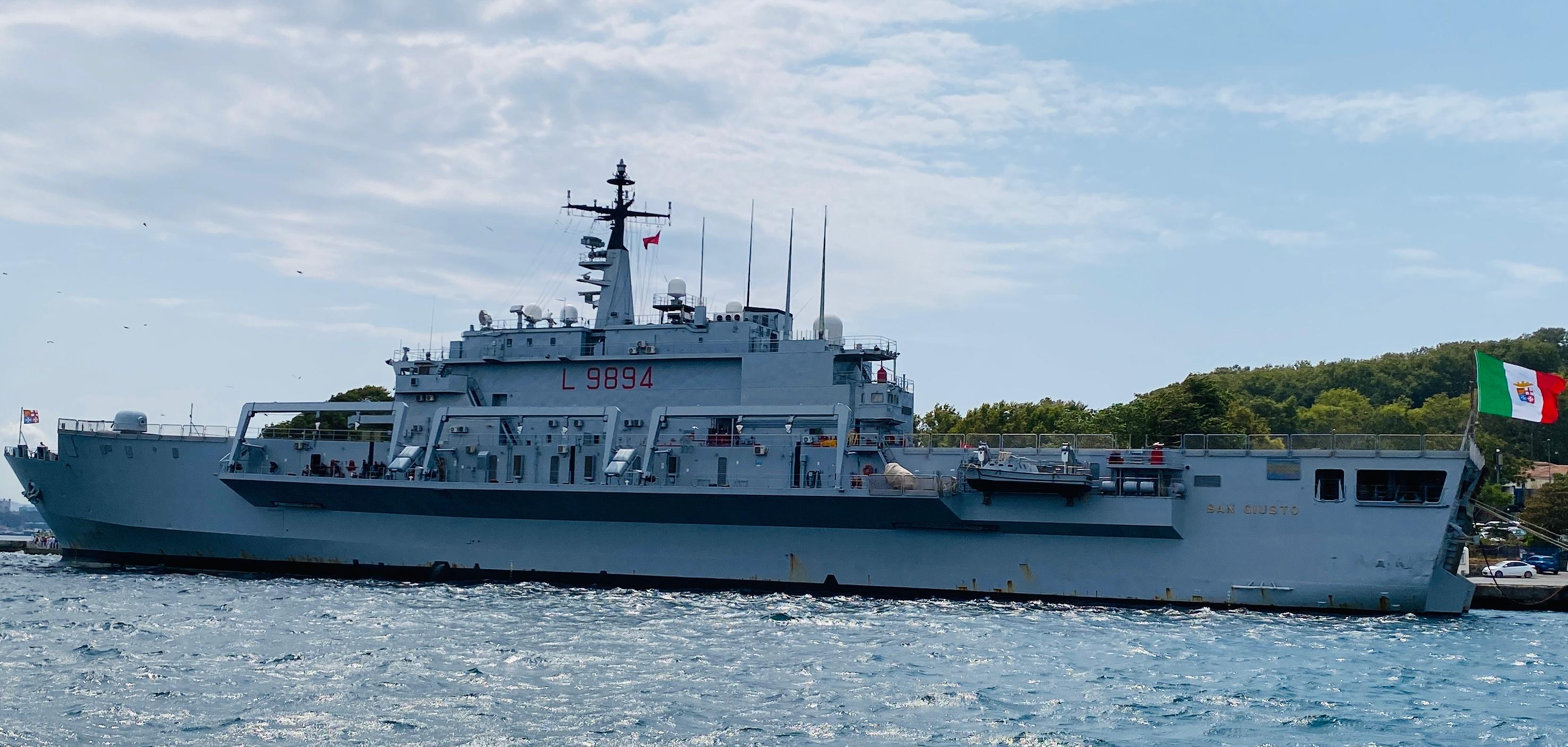
- San Giusto alongside at Istanbul in 2025

History

Italy
- Name: San Giusto
- Namesake: St. Justus
- Builder: Fincantieri-Cantieri Navali SpA, Riva Trigoso
- Laid down: 19 August 1991
- Launched: 2 December 1993
- Commissioned: 14 April 1994
- Home port: Brindisi
- Motto: Coragio no manca co' semo nel giusto
- Status: Active
- Notes: Pennant number L 9894

General characteristics
- Class & type: San Giorgio-class amphibious transport dock
- Displacement: 7,650-8,300 tons
- Length: 133 m (436 ft)
- Beam: 20.5 m (67 ft)
- Propulsion: 2 × Grandi Motori Trieste GMT A 420.12 diesel engines (12.426 kW)
- Speed: 21 knots (39 km/h; 24 mph)
- Range: 7,500 nautical miles (13,900 km; 8,600 mi) at 16 knots (30 km/h; 18 mph)
- Boats & landing craft carried: Three LCM, three LCVP and a patrol craft
- Capacity: 350 men with 30 medium tanks or 36 tracked armoured vehicles
- Complement: 17 officers, 163 ratings
- Sensors & processing systems: - SMA MM/SPQ 702 search radar; - GEM Elettronica SPN-748 navigation radar; - Selex ES RTN-10X fire control radar
- Electronic warfare & decoys: Elettronica SpA INS-3 ECM/ESM suite
- Armament: 1 × OTO Melara 76/62 mm Compatto gun; 2 × OTO Melara KBA 25/80 mm guns.
- Aircraft carried: 3 × AW-101 or 5 × Agusta Bell AB-212 helicopters
- Aviation facilities: Flight deck with three landing spots; Helicopter lifts; Vehicle deck

San Giusto (L 9894) is a San Giorgio-class amphibious transport dock of the Italian Navy. The ship was built by Fincantieri-Cantieri Navali SpA at Riva Trigoso, laid down on 19 August 1991, and launched on 23 October 1993.

== Operations ==
- 1997: Operation Alba, during the Albanian unrest
- 1999/2000: the ship was deployed to East Timor as part of the Australian-led INTERFET peacekeeping taskforce from 26 October 1999 to 15 February 2000.
- 2003: Operation Ancient Babylon/Operation Iraqi Freedom, support to Italian and coalition forces in Iraq
- June 2005: San Giusto was the flagship of Admiral Jonathon Band RN, during "Exercise Sorbet Royal", a NATO exercise in which ships from ten countries carried out simulated rescues from submerged submarines.
- 2008: DEEP BLUE/LONG KNIFE international exercise
- 2009: LOYAL MARINER 09 international exercise
- 2011: Operation Unified Protector, to support Libya coalition campaign
- 2012: flagship of Task Force Atalanta in Indian Ocean for anti-piracy rules
- 2014: Operation Mare Nostrum, to rescue refugees in Mediterranean Sea.
