= Maestrale-class frigate =

Ship class

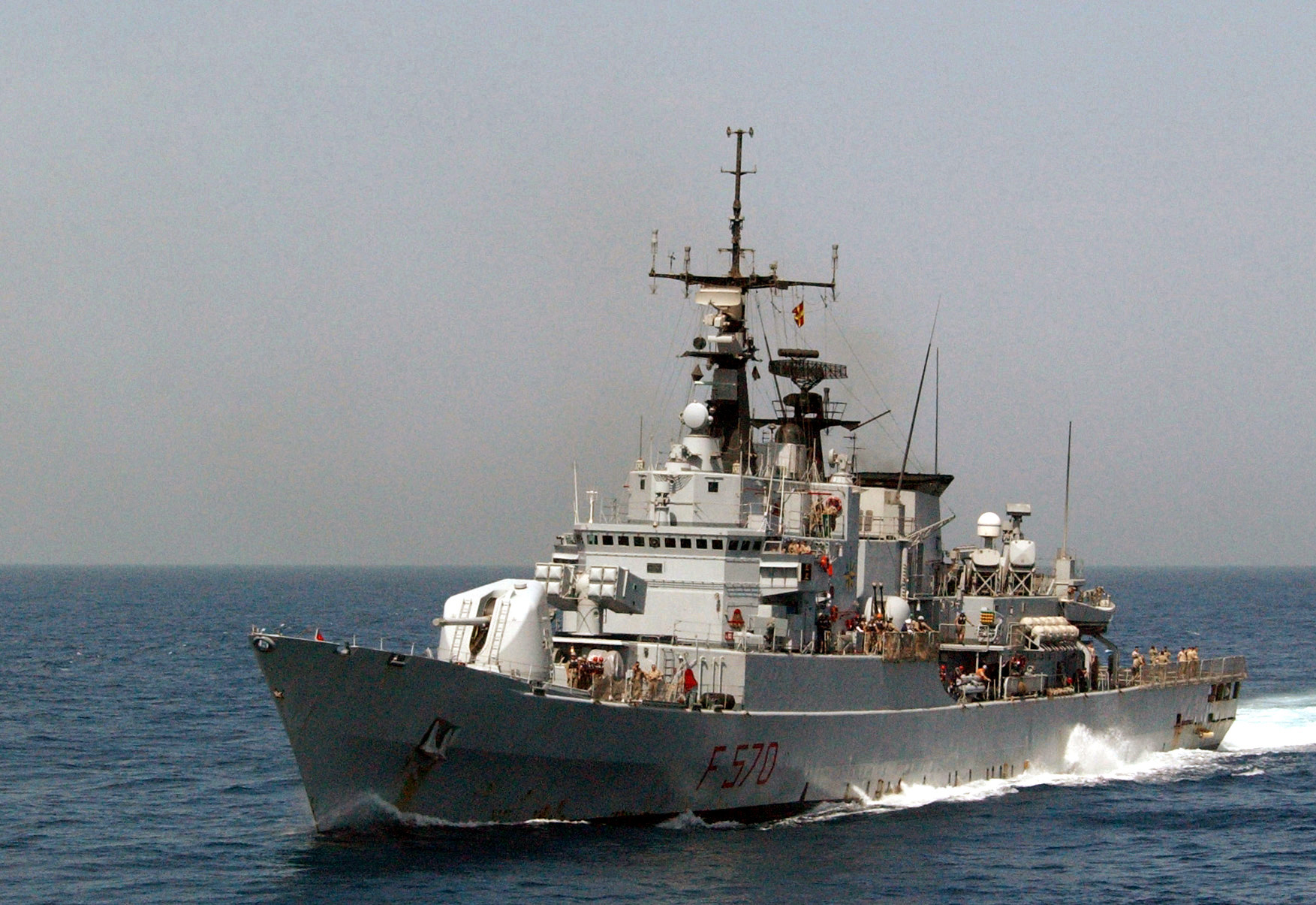
- Maestrale underway, 2002

Class overview
- Name: Maestrale class
- Builders: Cantieri Navali del Tirreno e Riuniti; Muggiano Shipyard; Riva Trigoso Shipyard
- Operators: Italian Navy
- Preceded by: Lupo class
- Succeeded by: Bergamini class
- Built: 1978–1982
- In commission: 1981–2024
- Completed: 8
- Retired: 8

General characteristics
- Displacement: 3,040 t (2,990 long tons) full load
- Length: - 122.7 m (403 ft) LOA; - 114 m (374 ft) LPP
- Beam: 12.9 m (42 ft)
- Draught: 4.2 m (14 ft)
- Propulsion: - CODOG scheme; - 2 × GE/Avio General Electric LM2500 gas turbines 18.380 MW (24,648 hp) each; - 2 × diesel engines Grandi Motori Trieste BL-230-20-DVM, 4.044 MW (5,423 hp) each; - 4 × diesel engine generators Grandi Motori Trieste A-236-SS, 780 kW (1,050 hp) each with Ansaldo generators; - 2 × 5-blade propellers
- Speed: 33 kn (61 km/h; 38 mph) (21 kn (39 km/h; 24 mph) on diesel)
- Range: 6,000 nmi (11,000 km; 6,900 mi) at 15 kn (28 km/h; 17 mph)
- Complement: 24 officers; 201 sailors
- Sensors & processing systems: - 1 × Selenia RAN-10S/SPS-774 surface and air surveillance radar; - 1 × Selenia SMA SPS-702 surface search radar; - 1 × Selenia SMA SPS-703 navigation radar (then replaced by one GEM Elettronica MM-SPN 753 Arpa); - 1 × Selenia SPG-75 fire control radar; - 2 × Selenia SPG-74 fire control radar (for Dardo); - 1 × Raytheon DE 1164, VDS sonar; - 1 × Raytheon DE 1160B, hull mounted sonar
- Electronic warfare & decoys: - (Elettronica Spa MM/SLQ-746) 2 × SLQ-D jammers; - 1 × ARBG-1A Saigon radio interceptor; - 1 × SLR-4 Newton intercept; - 2 × 20-round OTO Melara/Breda SCLAR decoy RL (Dagaie on Grecale); - 1 × AN/SLQ-25 Nixie towed acoustic torpedo system; - Prairie/Masker air-bubbler noise-suppression system
- Armament: - 4 × TESEO Mk-2 anti-ship missiles, double launchers; - 1 × Albatross octuple Aspide SAM launchers; - 1 × Otobreda 127 mm/54 gun; - 2 × Oto Melara Twin 40L70 DARDO CIWS; - 2 × Browning HB2B 12.7 mm; - 2 × MG 42/59 7.62 mm; - 2 × 533 mm torpedo tubes (Whitehead B-516, with Whitehead A-184 torpedoes: then removed); - 2 × 324 mm triple torpedo tubes (Whitehead ILAS-3) with Mk-46 Mod.2 torpedoes
- Aircraft carried: - flight deck 27 m (89 ft) x 12 m (39 ft) m; - 2 x AB-212 helicopters

The Maestrale class was a class of frigates of the Italian Navy. The class is composed of eight vessels, all of which were built by Fincantieri S.p.A., Riva Trigoso, except for Grecale, which was built by Fincantieri S.p.A. – Muggiano, La Spezia.

The Maestrale-class frigates were primarily designed for anti-submarine warfare (ASW), however the ships are highly flexible so they are also capable of anti-air and anti-surface operations. Ships of this class have been widely used in various international missions, either under NATO or UN flag, and during normal operations of the Italian Navy.

The first of these ships entered in service in early 1982. The rest of the fleet was launched over the next three years. The ships of the Maestrale class will be replaced by the Bergamini class.

== Design ==
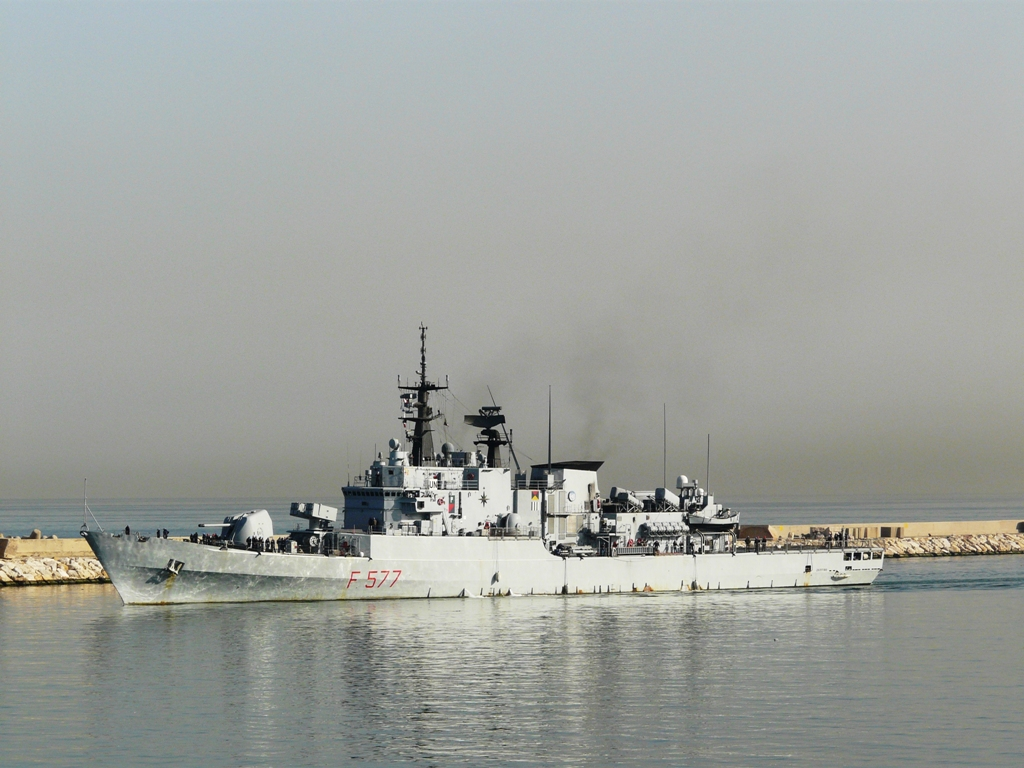
Zeffiro, Beirut 2010

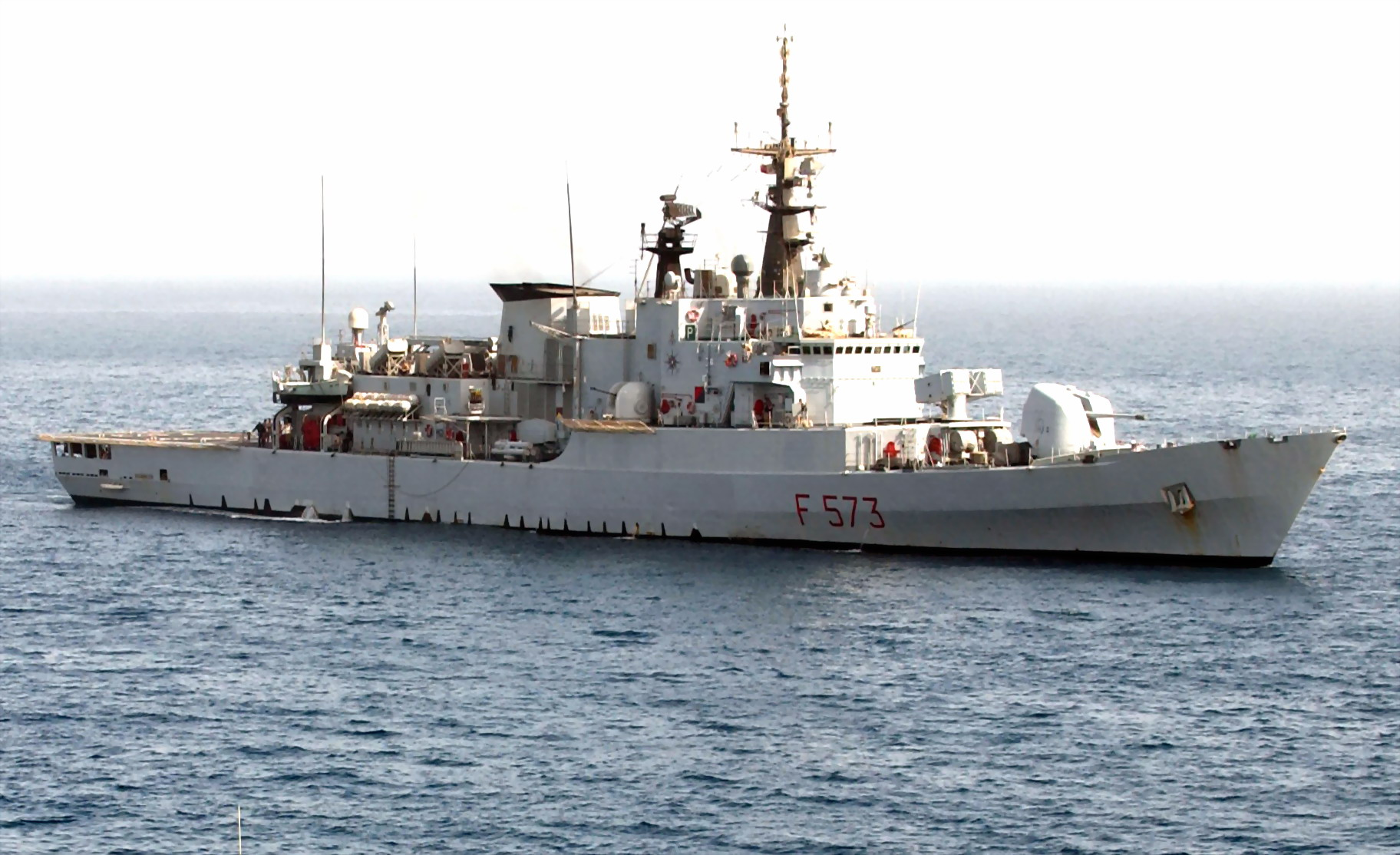
Scirocco, Persian Gulf during Iraqi Freedom 2004

These ships were built with the experience and the technology already developed for the previous Lupo class. The Maestrales were quite bigger and heavier, so they were slower, but still capable of around 32 knots (59 km/h; 37 mph). The ships have a large superstructure, with one large turret and only one funnel. There are two enclosed pyramid masts, one of which is quite low, the other much taller. The superstructure continues without interruption until the hangar, and is made, as usual, with light alloys.

The propulsion system is based on two gas-turbine GE-Avio LM-2500 and two diesel engines, in a combined diesel or gas configuration, that make use of diesel for cruising and turbines for high speed. The only problem with this configuration, which is highly economical, is to make the diesel engines powerful enough to achieve sufficient cruising speed without overloading them, or assist them with a continuous use (at low, uneconomical power) of the turbines. In this case, the solution, already developed for the Lupo-class ships, was successful. The ships have a maximum range of 6,000 nautical miles (11,000 km; 6,900 mi) at 15 knots (28 km/h; 17 mph).

=== Armament ===
The Maestrale class ships are armed with an array of systems. Mounted on the foredeck is an Oto Melara 127 mm/54 gun, capable of shooting 40 rounds per minute. Despite its large size, it was possible to fit it in the relatively small hull, since the Lupo-class ships were fitted with the same weapon. It has 66 shells on three ready-fire carousels. It also had low reaction times and high elevation, with a 32-kilogram (71 lb) shells and 23-kilometre (14 mi) range.

The ships also carry the Albatross missile system, with an octuple cell capable of firing Sea Sparrow or Aspide missiles. This modern weapon contains a monopulse guide and a powerful rocket-engine, and advanced flight controls. The ships carry a supply of 24 missiles, and the system is reloaded by a Riva-Calzoni Automatic Handling System, which is capable of loading up to four missiles at once, making virtually all the missiles in the magazine ready to be launched.

After the turret there are two CIWS DARDO, with two 40 mm/L70 Bofors guns. They have very rapid mechanical systems, and depots with over 700 shells, and can fire around 600 rounds per minute. The proximity fuses and the fire control systems help this unmanned turret to react quickly to incoming missiles.

Also on deck are four Otomat anti-ship missiles, capable of striking a target 180 km (110 mi) or more away, with a 210 kg (460 lb) warhead. They are fitted over the hangar, where there are two AB-212 helicopters ASW multi-role machines.

Finally, there are four torpedo-launchers, two triple ILAS-3 (similar to Mk 32) 324 mm (12.8 in) tubes, with 12 torpedoes available (not known if they are shared also with helicopters), and the A.184, a wired torpedo with two launch tubes and six to eight torpedoes. This is the main weapon for ASW tasks, but it also be used as an anti-ship weapon, even though its propulsion system (electric) does not allow great speed and range. Compared to ASROC, this weapon has many advantages, and does not require a bulky launcher, but needs several minutes, even at 35 knots (65 km/h; 40 mph), to reach 9 kilometres (5.6 mi), while ASROC can do this in much less time.

=== Electronic warfare outfit ===
These ships also have several electronic systems: one radar air and surface search RAN10S (160 km (99 mi)) is placed over the smaller tree, a radar of navigation and surface search SPN703 is fitted on the main tree, where a navigation radar is present as well, and finally, three radars: one RTN-10X for gun and Aspide control, and two smaller RTN-20X for the DARDO systems, all fitted in the forward superstructure, separated from the aft by the funnel and the heat dissipaters. As to submarine search, there is a VDS DE 1164 sonar, and DE1160B hull mounted. EW component is focused on Elettronica Spa MM/SLQ-746 and two SCLAR rocket-launchers that are capable of launching chaff, flare, and HE rockets up to 10 km (6.2 mi).

Several electronic and communication systems are fitted as well, and an Selex ES IPN20 command and control system is present to integrate all the tactical information and use the weapons on board.

== Comparison of Maestrale and Lupo classes ==
The Lupo class entered in service in 1977. The Maestrale class is an upgraded version of its predecessor. Maestrale shares the same, extremely slim hull (with a length/width of 10:1) but this was enlarged to accommodate many more systems. The Lupos are 3 kn (5.6 km/h; 3.5 mph) faster, and is equipped with eight OTOMAT. The Maestrales have much of Lupo's equipment, but arranged differently. Endurance was increased with the Maestrale class from 5,000 to 6,000 miles (8,000 to 9,700 km).

The Maestrales have half the OTOMATs of the Lupo class but twice as many torpedo launchers (with the introduction of the new heavy torpedoes), twice the helicopters, and twice the sonars, having also a VDS. This, coupled with heavy torpedoes and two helicopters, improved dramatically the ASW capabilities. The use of more modern equipment and an Albatross missile system improved in some aspects the air defense.

The Maestrale class has some shortcomings. The most prominent is the air-defense layout: while the Lupo class has the four weapons distributed across the entire hull length, Maestrales, because of the double hangar, lacked this ability, resulting in all of the weapons systems being placed on the foredeck and midships. This arrangement leaves dangerous blind spots in the ships' defenses.

After their entry in service, Maestrales were modernized with some minor programs. The equipment present on the Maestrale-class ships is almost equal to what it was in 1982, except for a pair of 20 mm guns installed as 'anti-fast vessels close defense', in 2005.

== Export ==
=== Philippines ===
A delegation from the Philippines' Department of National Defense (DND) inspected ships of both the Maestrale and Soldati classes of frigates during their visit to Italy in February 2012 as possible candidates for the Deep Water Patrol Vessel project of the Philippine Navy. No indication of sales was made.

A press conference by the DND on 2 August 2012 included the announcement of ongoing negotiations with the Italian government to purchase two Maestrale frigates for PhP 11.7 (approx. $240 million) billion and are expected to be delivered within 2013 after refurbishing. On 22 September the Philippines' Congress approved a budget that includes funding for the two frigates. The negotiations for the Maestrale-class ships were concluded without agreement to sell and transfers the ships, with the Philippine government opting to buy new frigates instead.

On 4 July 2013, it was announced that the Philippines would acquire two new frigates. The cost of the acquisition would be $400 million for two new frigates, with the Philippines rejecting the Italian Navy's offer of refurbished Maestrale-class frigates.

=== Indonesia ===
On 10 June 2021, Ministry of Defense of Indonesia signed a contract with Fincantieri for acquisition of six FREMM frigates, two Maestrale-class frigates and other related logistical support. The two Maestrale class will be acquired and modernized by Fincantieri after the ships were retired from the Italian Navy.

=== Ecuador ===
On 24 April 2024, Ecuador began negotiations with Italy to acquire two Maestrale-class frigates as replacement for their aging Condell-class frigates.

== Ships ==
Italian Navy – Maestrale class
Pennant number	Name	Builder	Hull number	Laid down	Launched	Commissioned	Modernization	Decommissioned	Motto
F 570	Maestrale	CNR; Riva Trigoso	875	8 March 1978	2 February 1981	7 March 1982	–	15 December 2015	Veloce e veemente
F 571	Grecale	CNR; Muggiano	876	21 March 1979	12 September 1981	5 February 1983	2007 / 2010	1 April 2025	Venti Impetu
F 572	Libeccio	CNR; Riva Trigoso	877	1 August 1979	7 September 1981	5 February 1983	2007 / 2010	29 February 2024	Paveant turbinem hostes
F 573	Scirocco	CNR; Riva Trigoso	878	26 February 1980	17 April 1982	20 September 1983	2007 / 2010	20 February 2020	Acriter in hostes
F 574	Aliseo	CNR; Riva Trigoso	879	26 February 1980	29 October 1982	20 September 1983	–	8 September 2017	Constans et indomitus
F 575	Euro	CNR; Riva Trigoso	880	15 April 1981	25 March 1983	7 April 1984	–	2 October 2019	Rapido Velocior Euro
F 576	Espero	CNR; Riva Trigoso	881	1 August 1982	19 November 1983	4 May 1985	–	30 June 2021	A nessuno secondo
F 577	Zeffiro	CNR; Riva Trigoso	882	15 March 1983	19 May 1984	4 May 1985	2007 / 2010	8 October 2023	Nitor in adversum

== See also ==
- List of naval ship classes in service

Equivalent frigates of the same era

- Bremen class
- Kortenaer class
- Georges Leygues class
- Niterói class
- Krivak class
- Knox class
