= List of ships built by Fincantieri =

Fincantieri – Cantieri Navali Italiani S.p.A. (Italian pronunciation: [fiŋkanˈtjɛːri]) is an Italian shipbuilding company based in Trieste, Italy. The following is a list of ships built by Fincantieri:

== 1959–1970 ==
Image	Yard number	IMO	Name	Type	Launched	Completed	Shipyard	Tonnage	Capacity	Operator	Note
	491	5005380	AGIP Gela	Oil tanker	29 September 1958	1959	Ancona	36.149 DWT		SNAM SpA	then Bordighera
	1652		Dunav	Bulk carrier	21 February 1973	1973	Muggiano	24.861 DWT		Jugolinija	
		7332555	Drava	Bulk carrier		1974	Muggiano	14.712 GRT		Jugolinija	
	1654		Punta Bianca	Reefer ship Punta Bianca class		1975	Muggiano	9.387 GRT		Arenella	
	1655	7365382	Punta Stella	Reefer ship Punta Bianca class		1976	Muggiano	15.820 t		Arenella	
	1656	7365382	Punta Verde	Reefer ship Punta Bianca class	6 November 1975	1976	Muggiano	15.820 t		Arenella	
	1657		Punta Sole	Reefer ship Punta Bianca class		1977	Muggiano	9.387 GRT		Arenella	
	1855	5005366	AGIP Bari	Oil tanker	24 January 1960	1960	Monfalcone	51.182 DWT		SNAM SpA	
	248		Andrea Doria (C 553)	Andrea Doria-class cruiser	27 February 1963	1964	Riva Trigoso	6.604 t f.l.		Italian Navy	
	252		AGIP Ancona	Oil tanker	19 May 1962	1963	Ancona	52.703 DWT		SNAM SpA	
	253		AGIP Genova	Oil tanker	2 June 1963	1963	Ancona	53.196 DWT		SNAM Spa	Since 1983 renamed Amethyst
	629 (777)		Caio Duilio (C 554)	Andrea Doria-class cruiser	22 December 1962	1964	Castellammare di Stabia	6.604 t f.l.		Italian Navy	
	637 (783)		Canguro Azzurro	Ro-Pax Canguro Azzurro class	28 March 1965	1965	Castellammare di Stabia	5.223 GRT		Traghetti Sardi	
	638 (784)		Canguro Rosso	Ro-Pax Canguro Azzurro class	4 July 1965	1965	Castellammare di Stabia	5.223 GRT		Traghetti Sardi	
	639 (790)		Vittorio Veneto (550)	Helicopter cruiser	5 February 1967	1969	Castellammare di Stabia	8.850 t f.l.		Italian Navy	
	645 (791)	6715372	Canguro Verde	Ro-Pax Canguro Azzurro class	23 April 1967	1967	Castellammare di Stabia	5.223 GRT		Traghetti Sardi	
	646 (793)		Canguro Bianco	Ro-Pax Canguro Azzurro class	5 August 1967	1968	Castellammare di Stabia	5.223 GRT		Traghetti Sardi	
	647 (792)		Mare Tranquillo	Bulk carrier	14 May 1967	1967	Castellammare di Stabia	15.989			
	648 (794)		Canguro Bruno	Ro-Pax Canguro Azzurro class	7 April 1968	1968	Castellammare di Stabia	5.223 GRT		Traghetti Sardi	
	4214 (795)		Ziemia Koszalinska	Bulk carrier	10 January 1968	1969	Castellammare di Stabia	15.718 GRT		CENTROMOR P.P. Poland	
	4215 (796)		Ziemia Kielecka	Bulk carrier	3 August 1968	1969	Castellammare di Stabia	15.744 GRT		CENTROMOR P.P. Poland	
	1870		Enrico Toti (S 506)	Toti-class submarine	12 March 1967	1968	Monfalcone	593 t		Italian Navy	
	1886		Attilio Bagnolini (S 505)	Toti-class submarine	26 August 1967	1968	Monfalcone	593 t		Italian Navy	
	1887		Enrico Dandolo (S 513)	Toti-class submarine	16 December 1967	1968	Monfalcone	593 t		Italian Navy	
	1888		Lazzaro Mocenigo (S 514)	Toti-class submarine	20 April 1968	1968	Monfalcone	593 t		Italian Navy	
	1906		Monica R.	Oil tanker	29 July 1967	1968	Monfalcone	85.392 DWT		Europa SpA, Palermo	
	1907	6813708	Kraljevica	Cargoliner	30 March 1968	1968	Monfalcone	6.276 GRT		Jugolinija	
	1908	6821779	Kastav	Cargoliner	15 June 1968	1968	Monfalcone	6.239 GRT		Jugolinija	
	1909	6906153	Bakar	Cargoliner	May 1968	1968	Monfalcone	6.239 GRT		Jugolinija	
	1910	6919459	Pazin	Cargoliner	October 1968	1969	Monfalcone	6.238 GRT		Jugolinija	
	1911		Rivalta		11 February 1968	1968	Monfalcone	55.810 GRT			
	1912	6829745	Vittorio Valletta	Oil tanker	3 August 1968	1968	Monfalcone	124.700 DWT	99.711 t	Compagnia Marittima Carlo Cameli, Genova	
	266	6915051	Iginia	Ro-Pax Ferry	18 February 1969	1969	Ancona	5.767 GRT		Ferrovie dello Stato Italiane	
	4228		Caterina M.	Oil tanker Caterina M. class	30 June 1969	1970	Monfalcone	115.877 GRT		Europa di Navigazione Palermo	
	4229		Anita Monti	Oil tanker Caterina M. class	18 March 1970	1970	Monfalcone	115.870 GRT		Europa SpA, Palermo	
	4231 (797)	6919758	Sibari	Ro-Pax Ferry	4 May 1969	1970	Castellammare di Stabia	5.767 GRT		Ferrovie dello Stato Italiane	
	4232		San Giusto	Oil tanker Caterina M. class	15 September 1970	1971	Monfalcone	115.926 GRT		Compagnia di Navigazione Cameli Genova	
	4234	6930685	ESSO Augusta	Oil tanker	18 March 1969	1970	Monfalcone	70.725 GRT		Columbia Navigazione Genova	
	4237 (798)	6921282	Boccaccio	Ro-Pax Ferry Poeta class	8 June 1969	1970	Castellammare di Stabia	11.779 GRT		Tirrenia Compagnia Italiana di Navigazione	
	4238 (799)	7000982	Carducci	Ro-Pax Ferry Poeta class	28 July 1969	1970	Castellammare di Stabia	11.779 GRT		Tirrenia Compagnia Italiana di Navigazione	
	4239 (800)	7015341	Leopardi	Ro-Pax Ferry Poeta class	14 March 1970	1971	Castellammare di Stabia	11.779 GRT		Tirrenia Compagnia Italiana di Navigazione	
	4242	7034816	Taeping	Container carrier	10 October 1970	1971	Sestri Ponente	25.827 GRT		Adam Schiffahrts Gesellschaft K.G.	
	4243		Taeho	Container carrier	5 December 1970	1971	Sestri Ponente			Adam Schiffahrts Gesellschaft K.G.	
	4245		Lily Prima	Ore Bulk Oil Ship Lily Prima class	30 May 1970	1971	Monfalcone	72.368 GRT		Lauro Group	
	4249 (803)		Capriolo	General cargo ship	11 June 1970	1971	Castellammare di Stabia	13.209 DWT		Lauro Lines Group	
	249	7010121	Pascoli	Ro-Pax Ferry Poeta class	11 January 1970	1971	Palermo	11.779 GRT		Tirrenia Compagnia Italiana di Navigazione	
	250	7010121	Petrarca	Ro-Pax Ferry Poeta class	16 January 1970	1971	Palermo	11.779 GRT		Tirrenia Compagnia Italiana di Navigazione	

== 1971–1980 ==
Image	Yard number	IMO	Name	Type	Launched	Completed	Shipyard	Tonnage	Capacity	Operator	Note
	274	7229837	Rosalia	Ro-Pax	15 October 1972	1972	Ancona	5.725 GRT		Ferrovie dello Stato Italiane	
	283		Audace (D 551)	Audace-class destroyer	2 October 1971	1972	Riva Trigoso	4.554 t		Italian Navy	
	4235		ESSO Italia		11 September 1971	1972	Monfalcone	117.260 DWT			
	4240 (801)	7052246	Manzoni	Ro-Pax Ferry Poeta class	19 February 1971	1971	Castellammare di Stabia	11.799 GRT		Tirrenia Compagnia Italiana di Navigazione	
	4241 (802)		Ardito (D 550)	Audace-class destroyer	27 November 1971	1973	Castellammare di Stabia	4.554 t		Italian Navy	
	4244		Sant'Ambrogio		22 February 1972	1972	Monfalcone	126.139 DWT			
	4250		Laura Prima	Ore Bulk Oil Ship Lily Prima class	12 February 1971	1971	Monfalcone	139.401 DWT		Lauro Lines Group	
	4253		Santa Rosalia		15 February 1971	1971	Monfalcone	115.926 DWT			
	4254		Zim New York	container carrier	19 June 1971	1972	Sestri Ponente			Zim Israel Navigation Co.	
	4255		Zim Tokyo	container carrier	28 August 1971	1972	Sestri Ponente			Zim Israel Navigation Co.	
	4256 (804)	7036670	Cervo	General cargo ship	7 November 1970	1971	Castellammare di Stabia	13.209 DWT		Lauro Lines Group	
	4257		Nazario Sauro (S 518)	Sauro-class submarine	9 October 1976	1980	Monfalcone	1.641 t		Italian Navy	
	4258		Carlo Fecia di Cossato (S 519)	Sauro-class submarine	16 November 1977	1979	Monfalcone	1.641 t		Italian Navy	
	4259	7224526	AGIP Sicilia	Tanker	15 July 1972	1972	Monfalcone	254.542 DWT		SNAM SpA	
	4260	7236191	AGIP Sardegna	Tanker	14 December 1972	1973	Monfalcone	253.528 DWT		SNAM SpA	
	4261	7218371	Lloydiana	Container carrier	27 May 1972	1973	Muggiano	34.050 DWT		Lloyd Triestino	
	4267	7117436	Luigi Esse	Oil tanker	22 August 1971	1972	Monfalcone	139.058 DWT		Siciloil SpA	1976 to Snam as AGIP Firenze and in 1986 converted to Floating Production Storage and Offloading unit
	4270 (805)		Conastoga		16 October 1971	1972	Castellammare di Stabia	17.505 GRT		BRILLANT TRANS. CO.	
	4271 (806)		Corsicana		24 June 1972	1973	Castellammare di Stabia	17.505 GRT		BRILLANT TRANS. CO.	
	4273		Zim Haifa	container carrier	29 January 1972	1972	Sestri Ponente			Zim Israel Navigation Co.	
	4274		Zim Genova	container carrier	20 May 1972	1972	Sestri Ponente			Zim Israel Navigation Co.	
	4275 (807)		Saipem Due		25 March 1972	1972	Castellammare di Stabia	8.546 GRT		Saipem SpA	
	4276		Primarosa		26 May 1973	1973	Monfalcone	125.302 DWT			
	4277		Ritina		26 September 1973	1974	Monfalcone	125.302 DWT			
	4278		Igara		30 March 1972	1972	Monfalcone	72.741 GRT			
	4279		Erminia Prima		11 November 1972	1973	Monfalcone	72.730 GRT			
	4281		Ernesto Fassio		10 November 1973	1974	Monfalcone	72.688 GRT			
	4282 (808)		Independencia I		12 March 1973	1973	Castellammare di Stabia	18.938 GRT			
	4283 (809)		Independencia II		19 May 1973	1973	Castellammare di Stabia	18.933 GRT			
	4284 (810)		Cielo di Salerno	Bulk carrier	22 September 1973	1974	Castellammare di Stabia	18.900 GRT		Petrolifera Sarda	
	4285 (811)		Cielo di Roma	Bulk carrier	24 November 1973	1974	Castellammare di Stabia	18.161 GRT		Petrolifera Sarda	
	4286	7315662	Nipponica	container carrier	18 December 1972	1973	Sestri Ponente	26.093 DWT		Lloyd Triestino	
	4287		Mediterranea	container carrier	31 May 1973	1973	Sestri Ponente			Lloyd Triestino	
	4288 (812)	7351240	AGIP Gela	Oil tanker	6 April 1974	1975	Castellammare di Stabia	29.890 DWT		SNAM SpA	
	4289 (813)		AGIP Ravenna	Oil tanker	15 June 1974	1975	Castellammare di Stabia	29.600 DWT		SNAM SpA	
	4290	7351680	NAI Matteini	Oil tanker	23 January 1974	1974	Monfalcone	125.348 DWT		Navigazione Alta Italia	
	4291	7351692	NAI Rocco Piaggio		16 May 1974	1974	Monfalcone	125.375 DWT		Navigazione Alta Italia	
	4300	7350959	Americana	container carrier	25 January 1974	1974	Sestri Ponente	23.838 DWT		Società Italia di Navigazione	
	4301		Italica	container carrier	28 September 1974	1974	Sestri Ponente			Società Italia di Navigazione	
	4304		Oceania		27 April 1974	1974	Monfalcone	126.450 DWT			
	4305		NAI Di Stefano		24 August 1974	1975	Monfalcone	126.468 DWT		Navigazione Alta Italia	
	4306		NAI Mario Perrone		9 November 1974	1975	Monfalcone	126.468 DWT		Navigazione Alta Italia	
	4307		Volere		1 March 1975	1975	Monfalcone	126.468 DWT			
	4308	7365447	AGIP Campania	Oil Tanker	9 June 1975	1976	Monfalcone	254.642 DWT		SNAM SpA	
	4309	7365459	AGIP Lazio	Tanker	14 October 1975	1976	Monfalcone	254.659 DWT		SNAM SpA	
	4310 (814)		Premuda Rosa		27 October 1974	1975	Castellammare di Stabia	30.100 GRT		Premuda	
	4311 (815)		Premuda Bianca		14 December 1974	1977	Castellammare di Stabia	30.100 GRT		Premuda	
	4312	7365461	AGIP Marche	Tanker	19 February 1976	1976	Monfalcone	254.650 DWT		SNAM SpA	
	4313	7365473	AGIP Abruzzo	Tanker	8 July 1976	1977	Monfalcone	254.632 DWT		SNAM SpA	
	4314 (816)		Buffalo		6 May 1975	1977	Castellammare di Stabia	30.300 GRT		Unicorn Lines	
	4315 (817)		Puerto Rosales		11 October 1975	1978	Castellammare di Stabia	30.300 GRT		Y.P.F. Argentina	
	4318	7365136	AGIP La Spezia	Tanker	25 January 1975	1975	Castellammare di Stabia	138.943 DWT		SNAM SpA	
	4319	7365148	AGIP Monfalcone	Tanker	7 November 1975	1975	Monfalcone	138.945 DWT		SNAM SpA	
	4324 (818)		Campo Duran		3 February 1976	1978	Castellammare di Stabia	30.300 GRT		Y.P.F. Argentina	
	4325 (819)		Canadon Seco		19 May 1976	1978	Castellammare di Stabia	30.300 GRT		Y.P.F. Argentina	
	4328		Draco		10 March 1978	1978	Monfalcone	43.957 GRT			
	4329		Lupus		28 July 1978	1979	Monfalcone	43.957 GRT			
	4330 (820)		Medanito		15 September 1976	1978	Castellammare di Stabia	30.300 GRT		Y.P.F. Argentina	
	4331 (821)		Bahrah		18 January 1977	1979	Castellammare di Stabia	30.300 GRT		Kuwait National Petroleum	
	4332		Africa	container carrier	12 June 1976	1977	Sestri Ponente			Lloyd Triestino	
	4333		Europa	container carrier	9 September 1977	1978	Sestri Ponente			Lloyd Triestino	
	4334	8758603	Castoro 6	semi-submersible pipelay vessel	6 May 1976	1978	Palermo and Trieste	31.500 GRT		Saipem SpA	
	4335		Langeberg	container carrier	15 January 1977	1977	Sestri Ponente			SAF Marine Corp.	
	4336		Perseus		31 March 1977	1977	Monfalcone				
	4337		Delphinus		1 September 1977	1978	Monfalcone	43.956 GRT			
	4338		Leonardo da Vinci		20 October 1979	1980	Monfalcone	1.456 GRT			
	4339		Leonardo da Vinci (S 520)	Sauro-class submarine	20 October 1979	1982	Monfalcone	1.641 t		Italian Navy	
	4340		Guglielmo Marconi (S 521)	Sauro-class submarine	20 September 1980	1982	Monfalcone	1.641 t		Italian Navy	
	4343		Tolteca		19 October 1977	1978	Monfalcone	27.754 GRT			
	4344		Quetzalcoatl		23 October 1978	1979	Monfalcone	27.759 GRT			
	4345 (822)	7602144	Deledda	Ro-Pax Ferry Poeta II class	26 May 1977	1978	Castellammare di Stabia	11.779 GRT		Tirrenia Compagnia Italiana di Navigazione	
	4346 (823)	7602156	Verga	Ro-Pax Ferry Poeta II class	10 September 1977	1978	Castellammare di Stabia	11.799 GRT		Tirrenia Compagnia Italiana di Navigazione	Since 1997 named Dimitroula
	4347 (824)	7602089	Domiziana	Strade Romane class Ferry	19 April 1978	1979	Castellammare di Stabia	12.523 GRT		Tirrenia Compagnia Italiana di Navigazione	then AF Francesca
	4348	7717377	Clodia	Strade Romane class – Ferry	9 March 1979	1980	Sestri Ponente	12.523 GRT		Tirrenia Compagnia Italiana di Navigazione	
	4349 (825)	7602106	Emilia	Strade Romane class Ferry	19 July 1978	1979	Castellammare di Stabia	12.523 GRT		Tirrenia Compagnia Italiana di Navigazione	then Adriatica
	4350 (826)	7602118	Nomentana	Strade Romane class – Ferry	8 March 1979	1980	Castellammare di Stabia	12.523 GRT		Tirrenia Compagnia Italiana di Navigazione	
	4351 (827)	7602120	Aurelia	Strade Romane class – Ferry	24 November 1979	1980	Castellammare di Stabia	12.523 GRT		Tirrenia Compagnia Italiana di Navigazione	
	4352 (828)	7602132	Flaminia	Strade Romane class – Ferry	31 May 1980	1981	Castellammare di Stabia	12.523 GRT		Tirrenia Compagnia Italiana di Navigazione	
	4353	7601994	Staffetta Ligure	Sociale class ferry	12 June 1979	1979	Sestri Ponente	6.914 GRT		Tirrenia Compagnia Italiana di Navigazione	since 2000 named Fudi
	4354	7602003	Staffetta Jonica	Sociale class ferry	4 March 1980	1980	Sestri Ponente	6.914 GRT		Tirrenia Compagnia Italiana di Navigazione	since 2005 named Arbore
	4363		Transmediterraneo		23 March 1979	1979	Monfalcone	8.281 GRT			never delivered, then Mantaro
	4364		Transatlantico		23 March 1979	1979	Monfalcone	8.281 GRT			never delivered, then Pachitea
	4365		Ganda Gama		27 July 1979	1981	Monfalcone	4.365 GRT			
	4366		Ganda Bhakti		27 July 1979	1981	Monfalcone	4.365 GRT			
	4367		Giuseppe Garibaldi (551)	Aircraft carrier	4 June 1983	1985	Monfalcone	13.850 t		Italian Navy	
	4370	8211291	Andrea Merzario	Ro/Ro Container	22 October 1980	1980	Monfalcone	30.644 t		Merzario Lines	then renamed Merzario Italia, in 1994 to US Department of Transportation as MV Cape Vincent (T-AKR-9666)
	4371	8211306	Comandante Revello	Ro/Ro Container	22 August 1980	1980	Monfalcone	30.644 t		Merzario Lines	then renamed Merzario Britannia, in 1994 to US Department of Transportation as MV Cape Victory (T-AKR-9701)
	4372	7822562	Ercole Lauro	Container carrier	31 January 1980	1980	Sestri Ponente	25.868 DWT		Lauro Lines Group	
	279		Al Idrissi			1976	Ancona	51.546 GRT			
	280		Capo Mimosa			1977	Ancona	51.546 GRT			
	281		Capo Berta			1977	Ancona	51.546 GRT			
	297		Ammiraglio Magnaghi (A 5303)	Hydrographic vessel	8 October 1974	1975	Riva Trigoso	1.744 t		Italian Navy	
	298		Stromboli (A 5327)	Stromboli-class replenishment oiler	20 February 1975	31 October 1975	Riva Trigoso	9.100 t		Italian Navy	
	300		Lupo (F 564)	Lupo-class frigate	29 July 1976	1977	Riva Trigoso	2.506 t		Italian Navy	
	301		Sagittario (F 565)	Lupo-class frigate	22 June 1977	1978	Riva Trigoso	2.506 t		Italian Navy	
	302		Perseo (F 566)	Lupo-class frigate	12 July 1978	1980	Riva Trigoso			Italian Navy	
	303		Orsa (F 567)	Lupo-class frigate	1 March 1979	1980	Muggiano			Italian Navy then to Peruvian Navy as Aguirre	
	304		BAP Carvajal (FM-51)	Carvajal-class frigate	17 November 1976	1979	Riva Trigoso	2.525 t		Peruvian Navy	
	305		BAP Villavisencio (FM-52)	Carvajal-class frigate	7 February 1978	1979	Riva Trigoso	2.525 t		Peruvian Navy	
	847		Assad Al Tadjier	Assad-class corvette		1977	Muggiano	545 t		Libyan Navy	
	848		Assad Al Tougour	Assad-class corvette		1978	Muggiano	545 t		Libyan Navy	
	849		Assad Al Kalij	Assad-class corvette		1979	Muggiano	545 t		Libyan Navy	
	850		Assad Al Hudud	Assad-class corvette		1979	Muggiano	545 t		Libyan Navy	
	851		ARV Mariscal Sucre (F-21)	Mariscal Sucre-class frigate	28 September 1978	1980	Riva Trigoso	2.525 t		Bolivarian Armada of Venezuela	
	852		ARV General Urdaneta (F-23)	Mariscal Sucre-class frigate	23 March 1979	1981	Ancona	2.525 t		Bolivarian Armada of Venezuela	
	853		ARV Almirante Brión (F-22)	Mariscal Sucre-class frigate	22 February 1979	1981	Riva Trigoso	2.525 t		Bolivarian Armada of Venezuela	
	854		ARV General Salom (F-25)	Mariscal Sucre-class frigate	13 January 1980	1982	Ancona	2.525 t		Bolivarian Armada of Venezuela	
	855		ARV General Soublette (F-24)	Mariscal Sucre-class frigate	4 January 1980	1981	Riva Trigoso	2.525 t		Bolivarian Armada of Venezuela	
	856		ARV Almirante García (F-26)	Mariscal Sucre-class frigate	4 October 1980	1982	Riva Trigoso	2.525 t		Bolivarian Armada of Venezuela	
	857		Vesuvio (A 5329)	Stromboli-class replenishment oiler	4 June 1977	31 October 1978	Riva Trigoso	9.100 t		Italian Navy	
	858		Serena		21 September 1977	1978	Ancona	10.803 GRT			
	859		Trieste		14 February 1978	1978	Ancona	10.803 GRT			
	872	7811305	Staffetta Mediterranea	Sociale class ferry	12 October 1978	1979	Ancona	11.346 GRT		Tirrenia Compagnia Italiana di Navigazione	since 1987 named Torres
	873	7820734	Adria	Sociale-class Ro-Ro	30 July 1980	1981	Ancona	17.961 GRT		Tirrenia Compagnia Italiana di Navigazione	since 1988 as Capo Carbonara
	885	7717341	Oglasa	Ro-Pax Ferry	22 March 1980	1980	Palermo	2.386,6 GRT		Toremar	
	886	7717353	Marmorica	Ferry	22 March 1980	1980	Palermo	2.386,7 GRT		Toremar	
			Nibbio P421	Sparviero class Hydrofoil	9 March 1980	1982	Muggiano	63 t		Italian Navy	
			Falcone P422	Sparviero class Hydrofoil	27 October 1980	1982	Muggiano	63 t		Italian Navy	
			Apulia	Sociale-class Ro-Ro	18 July 1980	1981	Sestri Ponente	17.961 GRT		Tirrenia Compagnia Italiana di Navigazione	since 1998 as Capo Spartivento
		7817799	Ardenza Prima	Oil tanker	1980	1981	Monfalcone	2.200 GRT		D'Alesio Group	

== 1981–1990 ==
Image	Yard number	IMO	Name	Type	Launched	Completed	Shipyard	Tonnage	Capacity	Operator	Note
			Astore P423	Sparviero class Hydrofoil	10 February 1981	1983	Muggiano	63 t		Italian Navy	
			Grifone P 424	Sparviero class Hydrofoil	1 December 1981	1983	Muggiano	63 t		Italian Navy	
			Gheppio P 425	Sparviero class Hydrofoil	24 June 1982	1983	Muggiano	63 t		Italian Navy	
			Condor P 426	Sparviero class Hydrofoil	25 January 1983	1984	Muggiano	63 t		Italian Navy	
	874		Torre del Greco	Sociale-class Ro-Ro	19 October 1981	1982	Ancona	17.961 GT		Tirrenia Compagnia Italiana di Navigazione	since 1988 as Capo Sandalo
	875		Maestrale (F 570)	Maestrale-class frigate	2 February 1981	1982	Riva Trigoso	3.040 t		Italian Navy	
	876		Grecale (F 571)	Maestrale-class frigate	12 September 1981	1983	Muggiano	3.040 t		Italian Navy	
	877		Libeccio (F 572)	Maestrale-class frigate	7 September 1981	1983	Riva Trigoso	3.040 t		Italian Navy	
	878		Scirocco (F 573)	Maestrale-class frigate	17 April 1982	1983	Riva Trigoso	3.040 t		Italian Navy	
	879		Aliseo (F 574)	Maestrale-class frigate	29 October 1982	1983	Riva Trigoso	3.040 t		Italian Navy	
	4373	7824687	Costa Arabica	Containers carrier	23 February 1981	1981	Monfalcone	20.096 DWT		Renesso SpA Genova	
	4374	7824687	Costa Ligure	Container Roll-on/Roll-off ship	23 February 1981	1981	Monfalcone	28.042 DWT			
	4377 (829)		Geltrude F.	Bulk carrier	18 July 1981	1981	Castellammare di Stabia	49.000 GT		Italiana Olii e Risi	
	4379 (830)		Serafina F.	Bulk carrier	23 January 1982	1982	Castellammare di Stabia	49.000 GT		Ferruzzi	
	4381		TNT Carpentaria		9 October 1982	1983	Monfalcone	50.144 GT			
	4382		TNT Capricornia		9 April 1983	1983	Monfalcone	50.144 GT			
	4383		Robert L.D.		30 January 1982	1982	Monfalcone	45.263 GT			
	4387 (831)		Sideraltair	Bulk carrier	13 May 1982	1982	Castellammare di Stabia	7.900 GT		Sidermar	
	4388 (832)		Siderpollux	Bulk carrier	16 June 1982	1982	Castellammare di Stabia	7.900 GT		Sidermar	
	4389 (833)		Agnadeen (A 102)	Stromboli-class replenishment oiler	22 October 1982	29 October 1984	Castellammare di Stabia	13.650 DWT		Iraqi Navy	(never delivered)
	4393 (834)		Riace	Ferry	8 February 1983	1983	Castellammare di Stabia	7.000 DWT		Ferrovie dello Stato	
	880		Euro (F 575)	Maestrale-class frigate	15 April 1983	1984	Riva Trigoso	3.040 t		Italian Navy	
	881		Espero (F 576)	Maestrale-class frigate	19 November 1983	1985	Riva Trigoso	3.040 t		Italian Navy	
	882		Zeffiro (F 577)	Maestrale-class frigate	13 June 1984	1985	Riva Trigoso	3.040 t		Italian Navy	
	888		Esmeraldas (CM11)	Esmeraldas-class corvette	5 October 1980	1982	Muggiano	685 t		Ecuadorian Navy	
	889		Manabi (CM12)	Esmeraldas-class corvette	5 February 1981	1983	Ancona	685 t		Ecuadorian Navy	
	890		Los Rios (CM13)	Esmeraldas-class corvette	28 February 1981	1983	Muggiano	685 t		Ecuadorian Navy	
	891		El Oro (CM14)	Esmeraldas-class corvette	9 February 1981	1983	Ancona	685 t		Ecuadorian Navy	
	892		Los Galapagos (CM15)	Esmeraldas-class corvette	5 July 1981	1984	Muggiano	685 t		Ecuadorian Navy	
	893		Loja (CM16)	Esmeraldas-class corvette	27 February 1982	1984	Ancona	685 t		Ecuadorian Navy	
	903		Artigliere (F 582)	Artigliere-class frigate	27 July 1983	1994	Ancona	2.525 t		Italian Navy	ex Iraqi Navy Hittin F-14
	904		Aviere (F 583)	Artigliere-class frigate	18 December 1984	1995	Ancona	2.525 t		Italian Navy	ex Iraqi Navy Dhi Qar F-15
	905		Bersagliere (F 584)	Artigliere-class frigate	20 June 1985	1995	Ancona	2.525 t		Italian Navy	ex Iraqi Navy Al-Yarmuk F-17
	906		Granatiere (F 585)	Artigliere-class frigate	14 November 1985	1996	Riva Trigoso	2.525 t		Italian Navy	ex Iraqi Navy Al-Qadissiah F-16
	907		Musa ibn Nusayr (F210)	Musa ibn Nusayr-class corvette		1986		550 t		Iraqi Navy	never delivered
	908		Tariq ibn Ziyad (F212)	Musa ibn Nusayr-class corvette		1986		550 t		Iraqi Navy	never delivered
	909 (301)		Laksamana Hang Nadim (F134)	Laksamana-class corvette	5 July 1983	1997	Marghera	550 t		Royal Malaysian Navy	ex Khalid ibn al Walid F216 Iraqi Navy
	910 (302)		Laksamana Tun Abdul Jamil (F135)	Laksamana-class corvette	30 December 1983	1997	Marghera	550 t		Royal Malaysian Navy	ex Saad ibn abi Wakkad F218 Iraqi Navy
	911 (300)		Laksamana Muhammad Amin (F136)	Laksamana-class corvette	5 July 1983	1999	Marghera	550 t		Royal Malaysian Navy	ex Abdullah ibn Abi Serh F214 Iraqi Navy
	912 (303)		Laksamana Tan Pusmah (F137)	Laksamana-class corvette	30 March 1984	1999	Marghera	550 t		Royal Malaysian Navy	ex Salah Aldin Ayoobi F220 Iraqi Navy
		8818180	MSC Hailey	Container carrier		1994	Castellammare di Stabia				
	305		Nikolay Markin	Ro-Ro		1984	Marghera			Shipcraft (Liberia)	
	306		Andinet	Cargo ship	21 December 1984	1985	Marghera	11.691 GT		Ethiopian Shipping Line (Ethiopia)	
	307		Netsanet	Bulk carrier		1989	Marghera			Ethiopian Shipping Line (Ethiopia)	
	915		Almirante Clemente (D12)	Almirante Clemente-class frigate	1955 / 1986	1986		1.500 t		Bolivarian Armada of Venezuela	
	916		General Moran (D22)	Almirante Clemente-class frigate	1955 / 1986	1986		1.500 t		Bolivarian Armada of Venezuela	
	919	8219918	Villa	Ro-Pax Ferry	9 November 1984	1985	Palermo	5619,73 GT		Ferrovie dello Stato Italiane	
	920		Saettia (CP-901)	Saettia-class offshore patrol vessel	December 1985	1999	Muggiano	427 t		Italian Coast Guard	
	921		Italian ship Alliance (A 5345)	Research vessel	9 July 1986	1988	Muggiano	3.180 t		NATO	since 2016 operated by Italian Navy
	922	8407450	Paolo Veronese	Ro-Pax	26 October 1985	1986	Palermo	3028,14 GT		Siremar	
	923		Minerva (F 551)	Minerva-class corvette	25 March 1986	1987	Riva Trigoso	1.285 t		Italian Navy	
	924		Urania (F 552)	Minerva-class corvette	21 June 1986	1987	Riva Trigoso	1.285 t		Italian Navy	
	925		Danaide (F 553)	Minerva-class corvette	18 October 1986	1988	Muggiano	1.512 t		Italian Navy	
	926		Sfinge (F 554)	Minerva-class corvette	16 May 1986	1988	Muggiano	1.512 t		Italian Navy	
	929		San Giorgio (L 9892)	San Giorgio-class amphibious assault ship	21 February 1987	1988	Riva Trigoso	7.960 t		Italian Navy	
	4384		AGIP Liguria	Tanker	27 January 1984	1984	Monfalcone	113.957 DWT		SNAM SpA	
	4385		AGIP Napoli	Tanker	8 April 1982	1982	Sestri Ponente	24.500 DWT		SNAM SpA	
	4386	8026191	AGIP Palermo	Oil Tanker	21 January 1983	1983	Castellammare di Stabia	24.430 DWT		SNAM SpA	
	4397	8217946	AGIP Lombardia	Oil Tanker	22 June 1984	1984	Monfalcone	113.881 DWT		SNAM SpA	
	4398 (835)		Donna Rita		23 July 1983	1984	Castellammare di Stabia	50.500 GT		Italmare	
	159		Valgardena			1985	Livorno	4.997 t			
	160	8402357	Giovanni Bellini	Ro-Pax Ferry	16 February 1985	1985	Livorno	1.573,13 GT		Siremar	
	4402	8219906	Scilla	Ro-Pax	22 September 1984	1985	Castellammare di Stabia	5619,63 GT		Ferrovie dello Stato Italiane	
	4404		Filomena Lembo	Bulk carrier	3 March 1984	1984	Castellammare di Stabia	50.500 GT		Deiulemar Group	
	4405		Salvatore Pelosi (S 522)	Sauro-class submarine	29 November 1986	1988	Monfalcone	1.662 t		Italian Navy	
	4406		Giuliano Prini (S 523)	Sauro-class submarine	12 December 1987	1989	Monfalcone	1.662 t		Italian Navy	
	4410	8412871	Ichnusa	Ro-Ro Cargo pax	7 November 1985	16 January 1986	Castellammare di Stabia	2.181 GT		Tirrenia	
	4411 / 354		Vento di Maestrale	Ro-Ro	1 March 1986	1986	Livorno	3.428 t		Tarros SpA	
	4412 / 353		Vento di Scirocco	Ro-Ro	20 September 1986	1987	Livorno	3.428 t		Tarros SpA	
	5820		Gemini		November 1986	1986	Ancona	17.599 GT			
	5821		Galassia		31 December 1986	1987	Ancona	17.599 GT			
	5822		Sagittarius			1987	Ancona	17.599 GT			
	5823		Cygnus		November 1987	1987	Ancona	17.599 GT			
	5824	8501567	Micoperi 7000	Semi-submersible Crane vessel	15 December 1986	1987	Monfalcone	172.000 GT		Saipem SpA	then SAIPEM 7000
	5825		San Marco (L 9893)	San Giorgio-class amphibious assault ship	10 October 1987	1988	Riva Trigoso	7.960 t		Italian Navy	
	5828	8511706	Repubblica di Venezia	Ro/Ro Container ship	3 March 1987	1987	Marghera	48.622 GT		Grimaldi Group	
	5829	8513467	Dole California	Container ship	3 June 1988	1988	Marghera Venezia	16.488 GT		Dole Fresh Fruit	
	5830	8513479	Dole Ecuador	Container ship	1989	1989	Marghera Venezia	16.488 GT		Dole Fresh Fruit	
			Dias	Bulk carrier		1988	Monfalcone				
	5832	8506555	Logudoro	Ro-Pax Ferry	June 1988	1989	Palermo	6505,06 GT		Ferrovie dello Stato Italiane	
	5834	8520484	AGIP Piemonte	Oil Tanker	19 August 1987	1987	Monfalcone	113.881 DWT		SNAM SpA	
		8501567	Saipem 7000	Semi-submersible platform	1987	1987	Monfalcone	117,812 GT	14,000 t tandem lift	Saipem	
	5836 / 355	8506543	Fata Morgana	Ro-Pax Ferry	1987	1988	Livorno	2.469,92 GT		Ferrovie dello Stato	
	5837	8521206	M/n Repubblica Di Genova	Ro/Ro Container ship	1988		Castellammare di Stabia			Grimaldi Group	
	5838	8521218	M/n Repubblica Di Amalfi	Ro/Ro Container ship	1989		Castellammare di Stabia			Grimaldi Group	
	5839	8521220	Crown Princess	Crown Princess-class cruise ship	25 May 1989	1990	Monfalcone	69.845 DWT		Astamar	
	5840	8521232	Regal Princess	Crown Princess-class cruise ship	29 March 1990	1991	Monfalcone	70.285 DWT		Astamar	
	5841	8521177	Bulk Genova	Bulk carrier	23 May 1988	1988	Monfalcone	134.964 DWT		Bulkitalia	
	5842		Amelia	Bulk carrier	18 August 1988	1989	Marghera	73.119 GT		Sicula oceanica	
	5843	8521189	Ignazio	Bulk carrier	1990	1990	Marghera	134.981 DWT		Bulkitalia	
	5844		Luigi Durand de la Penne (D 560)	Durand de la Penne-class destroyer	29 October 1989	1993	Riva Trigoso	5.400 t		Italian Navy	
	5846		Cassiopea (P401)	Cassiopea class patrol vessel	19 July 1988	1989	Muggiano	1.500 t		Italian Navy	
	5847		Libra (P 402)	Cassiopea class patrol vessel	27 July 1988	1991	Muggiano	1.500 t		Italian Navy	
	5848		Spica (P 403)	Cassiopea class patrol vessel	27 May 1989	1991	Muggiano	1.500 t		Italian Navy	
	5849		Vega (P 404)	Cassiopea class patrol vessel	24 February 1990	1992	Muggiano	1.500 t		Italian Navy	
	5850		Driade (F 555)	Minerva-class corvette	11 March 1989	1990	Riva Trigoso	1.512 t		Italian Navy	
	5851		Chimera (F 556)	Minerva-class corvette	7 April 1990	1991	Muggiano	1.512 t		Italian Navy	
	5852		Fenice (F 557)	Minerva-class corvette	9 September 1989	1990	Muggiano	1.512 t		Italian Navy	
	5853		Sibilla (F 558)	Minerva-class corvette	15 September 1990	1991	Riva Trigoso	1.512 t		Italian Navy	
	5856	8618437	Nuova Lloydiana	Container ship	October 1988	1989	Monfalcone	35.629 GT		Lloyd Triestino	
	5857	8618396	Nuova Africa	Container ship	1989		Castellammare di Stabia			Lloyd Triestino	
	5858	8618401	Nuova Europa	Container ship	1990		Castellammare di Stabia			Lloyd Triestino	
	5859	8618449	Cristoro Colombo	Container ship	16 January 1989	1989	Marghera Venezia	32.630 GT		Italia Line	
	5860	8618451	Amerigo Vespucci	Container ship	10 June 1989	1989	Marghera	32.630 GT		Italia Line	
	5861		Auriga	Lyra class	21 June 1990	1990	Monfalcone	260.783 DWT		Sidermar	in 2002 renamed Faith N
	5862		Cala Pevero	Reefer ship		1990	Ancona	8.962 GT			
	5863	8705682	Cala Portese	Reefer ship		1990	Ancona	8.962 GT			
	5864	8705694	Palladio	Ro-Pax	20 October 1988	1989	Ancona	10.193 GT		Adriatica di Navigazione	
	5865	8705079	Sansovino	Ro-Ro cargo pax	23 March 1989	1989	Ancona	10.977 GT		Adriatica di Navigazione	
	5867 / 356	8706727	Liburna	Ferry	25 May 1988	1989	Livorno	1.640 GT		Toremar	
	5869 / 357		Val Fiorita	LPG carrier	11 March 1989	1989	Livorno	4.066 t			
	5870 / 358		Val Sesia	LPG carrier	1989	1990	Livorno	4.066 t		Cispagas	
	5871		Antonio D'Alesio		21 September 1990	1990	Ancona	22.578 GT		D'Alesio Group	
	5874		Zara P01	Zara class patrol boat	22 April 1989	1990	Muggiano	320 t		Guardia di Finanza	
	5875		Vizzari P02	Zara class patrol boat		1990	Muggiano	320 t		Guardia di Finanza	
	5880	8900438	Lyra	Lyra class	15 February 1990	1990	Monfalcone	260.826 DWT		Sidermar	since 2002 as Alfred N
			Scarabeo 5	Self Propelled Drilling Rig	30 September 1989	1990	Sestri Ponente	23.000 GT		Saipem SpA	

== 1991–2000 ==
Image	Yard number	IMO	Name	Type	Launched	Completed	Shipyard	Tonnage	Capacity	Operator	Note
	5845		Francesco Mimbelli (D 561)	Durand de la Penne-class destroyer	13 April 1991	1993	Riva Trigoso	5.400 t		Italian Navy	
	5855 / 359	8705668	Cala Piccola	Refrigerated cargo ship	1 June 1991	1991	Livorno	8.984 t		Cosiarma	
	5866	8618413	S. Caboto	Container ship	1991	1992	Castellammare di Stabia			Lloyd Triestino	
	5868	8706739	Aethalia	Ro-Pax	7 July 1990	1991	Palermo	2.914,87 GT		Toremar	
	5877	8716502	Costa Classica	Cruise ship	2 February 1991	1991	Marghera	52.926 GT		Costa Crociere	
	5925		Eco Europa			1994	Marghera	79.516 GT			
	5926		Eco Africa			1994	Marghera	79.516 GT			
	5927		Tribute			1996	Marghera	79.643 GT			
	5929 / 360	9030709	Liliana d'Alesio	Tanker	12 November 1992	1993	Livorno	11.404 DWT		Dalmare	
	5930 / 361		Francesco d'Alesio	Tanker	18 May 1993	1993	Livorno	11.404 DWT		Dalmare	
	5878		Primo Longobardo (S 524)	Sauro-class submarine	20 June 1992	1993	Monfalcone	1.867 t		Italian Navy	
	5879		Gianfranco Gazzana Priaroggia (S 525)	Sauro-class submarine	26 June 1993	1995	Monfalcone	1.867 t		Italian Navy	
	5881		MS Statendam	Statendam-class cruise ship	1992	1993	Monfalcone	55,451 GT		Holland America Line	
	5940 / 362		Calafuria	LPG carrier	12 February 1994	1994	Livorno	8.744 t		Dalmare	
	5882		MS Maasdam	Statendam-class cruise ship	January 1993	1993	Monfalcone	55,575 GT		Holland America Line	
	5883		MS Ryndam	Statendam-class cruise ship	1 November 1993	1994	Monfalcone	55,819 GT		Holland America Line	
	5889		Isola blu	Tanker	January 1992	1992	Ancona	52.176 GT		Premuda	then Four Lakes
	5890		Guglielmo Effe	Tanker	1991	1992	Ancona	52.176 GT		Fermar	
	5891		Mare Dorico	Tanker	1991	1993	Ancona	52.176 GT		D'Amico	
	5892	8900397	Framura	Tanker	1991	1992	Ancona			Premuda	
	5898		Giovanni Grimaldi	Bulk carrier	1991	1992	Marghera	73.119 GT		Grimaldi Group	
	5899	8821046	Costa Romantica	Cruise ship	28 November 1992	1993	Marghera	53.049 DWT		Costa Crociere	
	5900	8900426	Maria Rebecca	Bulk carrier	15 April 1992	1992	Marghera	145.856 DWT		Fermar SpA	then Dong
	5901	8919350	Athesis Ore	Ore carrier	August 1991	1991	Monfalcone	260.000 DWT		Athesis	then Arthur N
	5902	8900323	Dole Honduras	Container ship	5 May 1991	1991	Ancona	16.657 GT		Dole Fresh Fruit	
	5903	8900335	Dole Costa Rica	Container ship	14 April 1991	1991	Castellammare di Stabia	16.488 GT		Dole Fresh Fruit	
	5904	9012692	Leonis	Tanker	30 October 1993	1994	Ancona	52.176 GT	94.225 DWT	Almare di Navigazione	
	5905		Scorpius	Tanker	9 April 1994	1994	Ancona	94.225 GT		Almare di Navigazione	
	5906		Almare Ottava	Tanker Aframax	1994	1994	Ancona	52.176 GT		Almare di Navigazione	
	5907		Almare Nona	Tanker Aframax	1 May 1995	1995	Ancona	52.176 GT		Almare di Navigazione	
	5908	9011014	Laurana	Ferry	15 February 1992	1992	Palermo	11.193 GT		Siremar	
	5909	9000259	Sun Princess	Sun-class cruise ship	1995	1995	Monfalcone	77.441 GT		Princess Cruises	
	5910	9064073	SNAM Portovenere	Gas Tanker	1996	1997	Sestri Ponente	46.555 GT		SNAM SpA	then LNG Portovenere
	5911		SNAM Lerici	Gas Tanker	1997	1998	Sestri Ponente	46.555 GT		SNAM SpA	then LNG Lerici
	5912	8818166	Nuova Genova	Container ship	1993		Castellammare di Stabia			Lloyd Triestino	
	5913	9009504	M/n Repubblica Di Roma	Ro/Ro Container ship	1992		Castellammare di Stabia			Grimaldi Group	
	5914	8818178	Nuova Trieste	Container ship	1993		Castellammare di Stabia			Lloyd Triestino	
	5915		Norasia Malta	Container ship	21 May 1994		Castellammare di Stabia			Lloyd Triestino	
	5916	9011026	Isola di Santo Stefano	Ferry	12 July 1991	1992	Palermo	1.312 GT		Saremar	
			Medi Baltimore	Bulk carrier	1997		Marghera	46.555 GT			then Pavian and Gurasis
	5918		Isola Verde	Product tanker	1994	1994	Sestri Ponente	19.400 GT		Finaval	
	5919		Carlotta	Product tanker	1994	1994	Sestri Ponente	19.400 GT		Finaval	
	5921		Destriero	Yacht	28 March 1991	1993	Muggiano	406 t		Fincantieri	
	5922	9031686	Via Mediterraneo	Ro Pax		1993	Palermo	14.398 GT		Tirrenia	since 1994 renamed Espresso Catania
	5923	9031698	Lazio	Ro-Pax Ferry	6 November 1993	1994	Palermo	14.398 GT		Tirrenia Compagnia Italiana di Navigazione	
	5924	9031703	Puglia	ro-pax Ferry	January 1995	1995	Palermo	14.398 GT		Tirrenia Compagnia Italiana di Navigazione	
	5932		San Giusto (L 9894)	San Giorgio-class amphibious assault ship	2 December 1993	1994	Riva Trigoso	8.000 t		Italian Navy	
	5933		Zircone		8 July 1992	1993	Riva Trigoso	5.045 GT			
	5939	8521220	Pacific Jewel	Crown princess-class cruise ship	25 May 1989	1990	Monfalcone	69.845 GT		P&0 Princess Cruises	
	5940	8521232	Pacific Dawn	Crown princess-class cruise ship	29 March 1990	1991	Monfalcone	70.285 GT		P&0 Princess Cruises	
			Lazio	Ro-Ro Viamare class	1993			14.398 t		Tirrenia Compagnia Italiana di Navigazione	
	5941	9070058	Carnival Destiny	Destiny-class cruise ship	15 November 1995	1996	Monfalcone	102.853 GT		Carnival Cruise Lines	
	5942		Ta Kuan AGS-1601	Research vessel	17 December 1994	1995	Muggiano	3.180 t		Republic of China Navy	
	5943		Capitano Giovanni	Bulk carrier	1995	1995	Castellammare di Stabia			Deiulemar	
	5944		Raffaele Iuliano	Bulk carrier	1995	1995	Castellammare di Stabia			Deiulemar	
	5945		Leonardo Lembo	Bulk carrier	1995	1995	Castellammare di Stabia			Deiulemar	
	5946		Giuseppe D'Amato	Bulk carrier	1995	1995	Marghera	77.000 DWT		D'Amato	
	5947		Luigi D'Amato	Bulk carrier	28 October 1995	1996	Marghera	77.000 DWT		D'Amato	
	5951 / 363	9105889	Teliri	Cable-laying ships	3 September 1995	1996	Livorno	8.345 GT		Elettra TLC SpA	
	5954		MS Veendam	Statendam-class cruise ship	1996	1996	Marghera	57,092 GT		Holland America Line	
	5955	9103996	Dawn Princess	Sun-class cruise ship	11 July 1996	1997	Monfalcone	77.441 GT		Princess Cruises	
	5956	9104005	Grand Princess	Grand-class cruise ship	1998	1998	Monfalcone	108.806 DWT		Princess Cruises	
	5957		Etna (A 5326)	Auxiliary ship	1997	1998	Riva Trigoso	13.400 t		Italian Navy	
	5958	9129873	MSC Alexa	Container ship		1996	Ancona	42.307 GT			
	5959		MSC Rafaela	Cruise ship		1996	Ancona	42.307 GT			
	5962	9108099	Solaro	LPG carrier		1996	Sestri Ponente	38.427 DWT		Carboflotta Group	
	5965	9125891	Pegasus One	MDV1200-class fast ferry	24 March 1996	1996	Riva Trigoso	4.465 t		Ocean Bridge Inc.	
	5979	9138850	Carnival Triumph	Modified Destiny-class cruise ship	1 July 1999	1999	Monfalcone	101.509 GT		Carnival Cruise Lines	
	5980	9122552	MS Rotterdam	Rotterdam-class cruise ship	21 December 1996	1997	Marghera	61,849 GT		Holland America Line	
	5981	9122576	Pasquale della Gatta	Bulk carrier	1996	1997	Castellammare di Stabia	74.500 GT		Deiulemar	
	5982	9122576	Giovanna Iuliano	Bulk carrier	1 February 1997	1997	Castellammare di Stabia	74.500 GT		Deiulemar	
	5983	9122588	Filippo Lembo	Bulk carrier	1997	1998	Castellammare di Stabia	74.500 GT		Deiulemar	
	5984	9130937	Grande America	Ro/Ro Container ship	1997	1998	Palermo	56.642 GT		Grimaldi Group	Has sunk in March 2019
	5985	9130949	Grande Africa	Ro/ro carrier	1998	1998	Palermo	56.642 GT		Grimaldi Group	
	5986	9130951	Grande Atlantico	Ro/Ro Container ship, Grande Africa class	1999	1999	Palermo	56.640 GT		Grimaldi Group	
	5987		Grande Europa	Vehicles carrier	1998		Castellammare di Stabia			Grimaldi Group	
	5988	9138393	Grande Mediterraneo	Vehicles carrier	30 June 1998	1998	Castellammare di Stabia	51.714 GT		Grimaldi Group	
	5989	9126807	Disney Magic	Magic-class cruise ship	17 April 1997	1998	Marghera	83.338 GT		Disney Cruise Line	
	5990	9126819	Disney Wonder	Magic-class Cruise ship	1999	1999	Marghera	83.308 GT		Disney Cruise Line	
	5991		Umberto D'Amato	Bulk carrier	1999	1999	Castellammare di Stabia			D'Amato	
	5992	9138410	Repubblica di Argentina	vehicles cargo	1998	1998	Sestri Ponente	51.925 t		Grimaldi Group	
	5993	9138422	Repubblica del Brasile	vehicles carrier	25 June 1998	1998	Sestri Ponente	51.925 GT		Grimaldi Group	
	5994	9131515	Bayard	Ro-ro carrier	1997	1997	Ancona	20.198 GT		Fred Olsen Lines	
	5995	9131527	Brabant	Ro-ro carrier	17 January 1998	1998	Ancona	20.198 GT		Fred Olsen Lines	
	5996		Denaro P03	Zara class patrol boat		1998	Muggiano	320 t		Guardia di Finanza	
	5998	9150913	Sea Princess	Sun-class cruise ship	26 January 1998	1998	Monfalcone	77.499 GT		Princess Cruises	
	5999	9141833	HSC SuperSeaCat One	MDV1200-class fast ferry	1997	1997	Riva Trigoso	4.465 GT	Hoverspeed		
	6000	9141845	HSC Superseacat Two	MDV1200-class fast ferry	1997	1997	Riva Trigoso	4.465 GT		Hoverspeed	
	6003	9HA2162	HSC SuperSeaCat Three	MDV1200-class fast ferry	1999	1999	Riva Trigoso	4.465 GT		Sea Containers	
	6004	9141883	HSC SuperSeaCat Four	MDV1200-class fast ferry	13 October 1998	1999	Riva Trigoso	4.465 GT		Sea Containers	
	6005		Pegasus Two	MDV1200-class fast ferry	27 February 1997	1997	Riva Trigoso	4.465 GT		Ocean Bridge Inc.	
	6008	9144275	Aries	Jupiter MDV 3000	10 January 1998	1998	Riva Trigoso	11.437 GT		Tirrenia Compagnia Italiana di Navigazione	
	6009	9144287	Taurus	Jupiter MDV 3000	28 February 1998	1998	Riva Trigoso	11.347 GT		Tirrenia Compagnia Italiana di Navigazione	
	6010	9147394	Pertusola	LPG carrier	1998	1999	Sestri Ponente			Carboflotta	
	6018	9143702	Gran Bretagna	vehicles carrier	1999		Marghera	51.714 GT		Grimaldi Group	
	6020	9157284	Tor Selandia	Ro-Ro cargo		1998	Ancona	24.196 GT		DFDS Seaways	then Selandia Seaways
	6021	9153020	Tor Suecia	Ro-Ro cargo		1999	Ancona	24.196 GT		DFDS Seaways	then Suecia Seaways
	6022	9153032	Tor Britannia	Ro-Ro cargo	1998	2000	Ancona	24.196 GT		DFDS Seaways	then Britannia Seaways
	6024	9173070	Marigola	LPG carrier	1999	1999	Sestri Ponente	12.800 GT		Carboflotta	
	6025	9511337	Giuseppe Bottiglieri	Bulk carrier	1999	1999	Castellammare di Stabia	91.909 GT		Elnav	
	6026	9175327	Grazia Bottiglieri	Bulk carrier	1999	1999	Castellammare di Stabia	39.385 GT		Elnav	
	6027		Cala Pino	Refrigerated cargo ship		1999	Ancona	13.346 GT			
	6028	9164768	Cala Pula	Refrigerated cargo ship		1999	Ancona	13.346 GT			
	6029	9164770	Cala Palma	Refrigerated cargo ship		2000	Ancona	13.346 DWT		Costa Container Lines	
	6030		Cala Pedra	Refrigerated cargo ship		2000	Ancona	13.346 DWT			
	6035	9156515	MS Volendam	Rotterdam-class cruise ship	1999	1999	Marghera	60,906 GT		Holland America Line	
	6036	9156527	MS Zaandam	Rotterdam-class cruise ship	2000	2000	Marghera	61,396 GT		Holland America Line	
	6044	9169550	Ocean Princess	Sun-class cruise ship	20 January 2000	2000	Monfalcone	77.499 GT		P&O Princess Cruises	
	6045	9172648	Carnival Victory	Modified Destiny-class cruise ship	31 October 1999	2000	Monfalcone	101.509 GT		Carnival Cruise Lines	
	6046	9179658	Capricorn	Jupiter MDV 3000	12 December 1998	1999	Riva Trigoso	11.347 GT		Tirrenia Compagnia Italiana di Navigazione	
	6047	9179660	Scorpio	Jupiter MDV 3000	17 March 1999	1999	Riva Trigoso	11.347 GT		Tirrenia Compagnia Italiana di Navigazione	
		9178907	Excelsior	Ro-Pax ferry	17 January 1999	1999	Sestri Ponente	39,777 GT	2,253 passengers; 760 cars	Grandi Navi Veloci	
	6050	9192351	Golden Princess	Grand-class cruise ship	May 2001	2001	Monfalcone	108.865 GT		Princess Cruises	
	6051	9192363	Star Princess	Grand-class cruise ship	10 May 2001	2002	Monfalcone	108.977 DWT		Princess Cruises	
	6052	9188037	MS Amsterdam	Rotterdam-class cruise ship	4 January 2000	2000	Marghera	62,735 GT		Holland America Line	
	6053	9196709	Ievoli Splendor	LPG carrier	2000	2000	Ancona	16.850 t		Marnavi	
	6054		Isola blu	LPG carrier	2000	2001	Ancona	16.754 t		Marnavi	
	6055	9198123	Grande Brasile	Grande Africa class Ro/Ro Container ship	2000	2001	Palermo	56.660 GT		Grimaldi Group	
	6056	9198135	Grande Argentina	Grande Africa class Ro/Ro Container ship	11 November 2000	2001	Palermo	56.660 GT		Grimaldi Group	
	6059	9204063	HSF Knossos Palace	Fast Cruiseferry	28 June 2000	2000	Sestri Ponente	24.352 GT		Minoan Lines	
	6060		HSF Festos Palace	Fast Cruiseferry	16 November 2000	2001	Sestri Ponente	24.352 GT		Minoan Lines	
	6061		Comandante Cigala Fulgosi (P 490)	Comandanti-class patrol vessel	7 October 2000	2004	Riva Trigoso	1.512 t		Italian Navy	
	6064		Comandante Foscari (P 493)	Comandanti-class patrol vessel	24 November 2000	2004	Riva Trigoso	1.512 t		Italian Navy	
	6065		Pride of Rotterdam	Ferry	29 September 2000	2001	Marghera	59.925 GT		P&O Ferries	

== 2001-2010 ==
Image	Yard number	IMO	Name	Type	Launched	Completed	Shipyard	Tonnage	Capacity	Operator	Note
	6057	9198355	Carnival Conquest	Conquest-class cruise ship	1 February 2002	2002	Monfalcone	110.000 DWT		Carnival Corporation & plc	
	6058	9198367	Carnival Glory	Conquest-class cruise ship	19 July 2003	2003	Monfalcone	110.000 DWT		Carnival Corporation & plc	
	6062		Comandante Borsini (P 491)	Comandanti-class patrol vessel	17 February 2001	2004	Riva Trigoso	1.512 t		Italian Navy	
	6063		Comandante Bettica (P 492)	Comandanti-class patrol vessel	23 June 2001	2004	Riva Trigoso	1.512 t		Italian Navy	
	6066	9208629	Pride of Hull	Ro-Pax	11 April 2001	2001	Marghera	59.925 GT		P&O Ferries	
	101		RV Petrel	Research vessel		2003	VARD Brattvaag	3.371 GT		Uksnoy & Co A/S	
	6067	9215490	Caribbean Princess	Grand-class cruise ship	4 July 2003	2004	Monfalcone	112.894 DWT		Princess Cruises	
	6069		Bithia	Bithia class Roll-on/Roll-off	10 February 2001	2001	Castellammare di Stabia	36.500 GT		Tirrenia Compagnia Italiana di Navigazione	
	6070		Janas	Bithia class Roll-on/Roll-off	22 September 2001	2002	Castellammare di Stabia	36.500 GT		Tirrenia Compagnia Italiana di Navigazione	
	6073		Olympia Palace	Ro/Ro Palace class	14 June 2001	2001	Sestri Ponente	36.825 t		Minoan Lines	
	6074		Europa Palace	Ro/Ro Palace class	26 October 2001	2002	Sestri Ponente	36.800 t		Minoan Lines	
	6075	9221279	MS Zuiderdam	Vista-class cruise ship	14 December 2001	2002	Marghera	81,769 GT – 61.867 DWT		Holland America Line	
	6076	9221281	MS Oosterdam	Vista-class cruise ship	2003	2003	Marghera	82,000 GT		Holland America Line	
	6077		MS Westerdam	Vista-class cruise ship	2004	2004	Marghera	81,811 GT		Holland America Line	
	6078	9226906	Arcadia	Vista-class cruise ship	26 June 2004	2005	Marghera	82.000 DWT		P&O Cruises	
	6079	9230115	MS Noordam	Vista-class cruise ship	2005	2006	Marghera	82,500 GT		Holland America Line	
	6080		Italian ship Elettra (A 5340)	Sourveillance ship	24 July 2002	2003	Muggiano	3.180 t		Italian Navy	
	6081		Danielle Casanova	Ro-Pax	28 November 2011	2002	Ancona	41.447 GT		SNCM	
	6082	9236389	Carnival Valor	Conquest-class cruise ship	27 March 2004	2004	Monfalcone	110.000 DWT		Carnival Corporation & plc	
	6083		Ubaldo Diciotti CP-902	Class 900 Ocean going patrol boats	2001	2002	Muggiano	420 t		Italian Coast Guard since 2014 as P901 to SENAN Panama	
	6084		Luigi Dattilo CP-903	Class 900 Ocean going patrol boats	2001	2002	Muggiano	420 t		Italian Coast Guard since 2014 as P902 to SENAN Panama	
	6085		Michele Fiorillo CP-904	Class 900 Ocean going patrol boats	2001	2003	Muggiano	420 t		Italian Coast Guard	
	6086	9239783	Costa Fortuna	Modified Destiny-class cruise ship	11 November 2002	2003	Sestri Ponente	102.587 DWT		Costa Crociere	
	6087	9239795	Costa Magica	Modified Destiny-class cruise ship	1 December 2003	2004	Sestri Ponente	102.587 DWT		Costa Crociere	
	6088		Sirio (P 409)	Sirio-class patrol vessel	11 May 2002	2003	Muggiano	1.580 t		Italian Navy	
	6089		Orione (P 410)	Sirio-class patrol vessel	27 July 2002	2003	Riva Trigoso	1.580 t		Italian Navy	
	6090		Cavour (550)	Aircraft carrier	20 July 2004	2008	Riva Trigoso and Genova	27.100 t		Italian Navy	
	6091	9246580	Grande Nigeria	Grande Africa class Ro/Ro Container ship	26 October 2002	2003	Ancona	56.738 GT		Grimaldi Group	
	6092	9246592	Grande Francia	Grande Africa class Ro/Ro Container ship	2002	2002	Castellammare di Stabia	56.738 GT		Grimaldi Group	
	6093	9246607	Grande Amburgo	Grande Africa class Ro/Ro Container ship	6 September 2003	2004	Castellammare di Stabia	58.500 GT		Grimaldi Group	
	6094	9253208	Grande San Paolo	Grande Africa class Ro/Ro Container ship		2003	Palermo	56.738 GT		Grimaldi Group	
	6095	9253210	Grande Buenos Aires	Grande Africa class Ro/Ro Container ship		2004	Palermo	56.738 GT		Grimaldi Group	
	6096	9263655	Athara	Bithia class Roll-on/Roll-off	14 January 2003	2003	Castellammare di Stabia	35.736 GT		Tirrenia Compagnia Italiana di Navigazione	
	6100	9293399	Crown Princess	Grand-class cruise ship	9 September 2005	2006	Monfalcone	113.000 GT		Princess Cruises	
	6105		Alfredo Peluso CP-905	Class 900 Ocean going patrol boats		2003	Muggiano	420 t		Italian Coast Guard	
	6106		Marola	LPG Carrier	26 July 2003	2003	Ancona	25.300 t		Carboflotta	
	6107		Oreste Corsi CP-906	Class 900 Ocean going patrol boats		2004	Muggiano	420 t		Italian Coast Guard	
	6108		Andrea Doria (D 553)	Orizzonte-class frigate	14 October 2005	2007	Riva Trigoso	7.050 t		Italian Navy	
	6109		Caio Duilio (D 554)	Orizzonte-class frigate	23 October 2007	2009	Riva Trigoso	7.050 t		Italian Navy	
	6111	9278181	Carnival Liberty	Conquest-class cruise ship	9 July 2005	2005	Monfalcone	110.000 DWT		Carnival Corporation & plc	
			Salvatore Todaro (S 526)	Todaro-class submarine	6 November 2003	2006	Muggiano	1.830 t		Italian Navy	
			Scirè (S 527)	Todaro-class submarine	18 December 2004	2007	Muggiano	1.830 t		Italian Navy	
	6113		Nuraghes	Passenger Roll-on/Roll-off Cargo Ship, Nuraghes class	24 January 2004	2004	Castellammare di Stabia	39.780 GT		Tirrenia Compagnia Italiana di Navigazione	
	6114		Sharden	Passenger Roll-on/Roll-off Cargo Ship, Nuraghes class	28 September 2004	2005	Castellammare di Stabia	39.780 GT		Tirrenia Compagnia Italiana di Navigazione	
	6116		Moby Aki	Passenger Roll-on/Roll-off Cargo Ship	2005	2005	Ancona	36.284 GT		Moby Lines	
	6119	9306706	Neptune Okeanis	vehicle carrier	19 February 2005	2005	Palermo	27.788 GT		Thelisis Shipping Ltd	
	6120	9306718	Neptune Thelisis	Vehicle carrier	July 2005	2006	Palermo	27.788 GT		Thelisis Shipping Ltd	
	6122	9320544	Costa Concordia	Concordia-class cruise ship	2 September 2005	2006	Sestri Ponente	114.147 GT		Costa Crociere	
	6123	9319442	MS Finnstar	Star-class ferry	30 July 2005	2006	Castellammare di Stabia	42.923 GT		Finnlines	
		9336264	MS Finnlady	Star-class ferry	August 2006	2007	Castellammare di Stabia	45,923 GT	500 passengers; 4,200 lane metres	Finnlines	
	6125		MS Finnmaid	Star-class ferry	28 October 2005	2006	Ancona	45.923 GT		Finnlines	
	6126		P61	Diciotti-class offshore patrol vessel	2005	2005	Muggiano	399 t		Maltese Navy	
	6127	9320556	MS Queen Victoria	Vista-class cruise ship	15 January 2007	2007	Marghera	90.049 GT		Cunard Line	
	6128	9328015	HSC Gotlandia II	Fast ferry	22 December 2005	2006	Riva Trigoso	6.554 GT		Destination Gotland	
	6129	9333149	Carnival Freedom	Conquest-class cruise ship	28 April 2006	2007	Marghera	110.000 DWT		Carnival Corporation & plc	
	6130	9343132	Costa Serena	Concordia-class cruise ship	4 August 2006	2007	Sestri Ponente	114.147 DWT		Costa Crociere	
	6131		Emerald Princess	Grand-class cruise ship	1 June 2006	2007	Monfalcone	113.000 GT		Princess Cruises	
	6132	9333175	MV Ventura	Grand-class cruise ship	8 June 2007	2008	Monfalcone	116,017 GT		P&O Cruises	
	6133	9336268	MS Europalink	Star-class ferry	3 June 2006	2007	Ancona	45.923 GT		Finnlines	then named Finnlady
	6134		MS Nordlink	Star-class ferry	9 January 2007	2007	Castellammare di Stabia and Ancona	45.923 GT		Finnlines	
	6135	9333163	Carnival Splendor	Splendor-class cruise ship	3 August 2007	2008	Sestri Ponente	113.300 DWT		Carnival Corporation & plc	
	6136	9351476	Cruise Roma	Cruise Roma class Roll-on/Roll-off cargo-pax	22 June 2007	2008	Castellammare di Stabia	54.310 t		Grimaldi Group	
	6137	9351488	Cruise Barcelona	Cruise Roma class Roll-on/Roll-off cargo-pax	16 February 2008	2008	Castellammare di Stabia	54.310 GT		Grimaldi Group	
	6138	9351490	Cruise Europa	Cruise Roma class Roll-on/Roll-off cargo-pax	14 March 2009	2009	Castellammare di Stabia	54.310 t		Minoan Lines	
	6139	9351505	Cruise Olympia	Cruise Roma class Roll-on/Roll-off cargo-pax	14 November 2009	2010	Castellammare di Stabia	54.310 t		Minoan Lines	
	6140	9365398	MS Superstar	Ferry	5 October 2007	2008	Ancona	36.400 GT		Tallink	
	6144	9370018	MS Fram	Cruise ship	18 November 2006	2007	Monfalcone	12.700 GT		Hurtigruten	
	6147	9384485	ORV Sagar Nidhi	ORV Sagar Nidhi	9 July 2007	2007	Muggiano	5.000 t		National Institute of Ocean Technology India	
	6148	9378498	Costa Pacifica	Concordia-class cruise ship	30 June 2008	2009	Sestri Ponente	114.500 t		Costa Crociere	
	6149	9378448	MS Eurodam	Vista-class cruise ship	28 September 2007	2008	Marghera	86,273 GT		Holland America Line	
	6150	9378462	Ruby Princess	Grand-class cruise ship	1 February 2008	2008	Monfalcone	113,000 GT		Princess Cruises	
	6151	9378474	Carnival Dream	Dream-class cruise ship	24 October 2008	2009	Monfalcone	130.000 DWT		Carnival Corporation & plc	
	6152	9381495	AH Liguria	Tug Boat	21 December 2007	2008	Riva Trigoso	3.012 DWT		Finarge Armamento Genovese	
	6153	9385398	AH Camogli	Tug Boat	10 July 2008	2009	Riva Trigoso	3.012 DWT		Finarge Armamento Genovese	
	6154	1010090	Serene	Yacht	28 September 2010	2011	Riva Trigoso			MBS	
	6155	9398905	Costa Luminosa	Hybrid design based on the Vista and Spirit class cruise ships	30 June 2008	2009	Marghera	92,700 DWT		Costa Crociere	
	6156		Fatah 701	Saettia-class offshore patrol vessel	28 January 2009	2009	Riva Trigoso	450 t		Iraqi Navy	
	6157		el-Nasir 702	Saettia-class offshore patrol vessel	2009	2009	Riva Trigoso	450 t		Iraqi Navy	
	6158		Majid 703	Saettia-class offshore patrol vessel	15 April 2009	2009	Muggiano	450 t		Iraqi Navy	
	6159		Shmookh 704	Saettia-class offshore patrol vessel	2009	2009	Muggiano	450 t		Iraqi Navy	
	6160		UOS Atlantis	Anchor handling tug supply vessel modified MOSS 424 h design	26 November 2008	2009	Riva Trigoso	3.100 t		HARTMANN-REDEREI Leer Germany	
	6161		UOS Challenger	Anchor handling tug supply vessel modified MOSS 424 h design	2007	2009	Genova	3.100 t		HARTMANN-REDEREI Leer Germany	
	6162		UOS Columbia	Anchor handling tug supply vessel modified MOSS 424 h design	9 June 2009	2009	Genova	3.100 t		HARTMANN-REDEREI Leer Germany	
	6163		UOS Discovery	Anchor handling tug supply vessel modified MOSS 424 h design	2 September 2009		Genova	3.100 t		HARTMANN-REDEREI Leer Germany	
	6164	9398917	Costa Deliziosa	Vista-class cruise ship	12 March 2009	2009	Marghera	92.500 DWT		Costa Crociere	
	6166	9424883	MS Azura	Grand-class cruise ship	26 June 2009	2010	Monfalcone	115,055 GT		P&O Cruises	
	6167	9378486	Carnival Magic	Dream-class cruise ship	27 August 2010	2011	Monfalcone	130.000 GT		Carnival Corporation & plc	
	6168		UOS Endeavour	Anchor handling tug supply vessel modified MOSS 424 h design	2008		Genova	3.100 t		HARTMANN-REDEREI Leer Germany	
	6169	9439905	UOS Enterprise	Anchor handling tug supply vessel modified MOSS 424 h design	2009	2010	Palermo	3.100 t		HARTMANN-REDEREI Leer Germany	
	6170			Yacht	2008			80 m			
	6171		UOS Explorer	Anchor handling tug supply vessel modified MOSS 424 h design	15 October 2009		Genova	3.100 t		HARTMANN-REDEREI Leer Germany	
	6172	9439929	UOS Freedom	Anchor handling tug supply vessel modified MOSS 424 h design	2010		Palermo	3.006 DWT		HARTMANN-REDEREI Leer Germany	
	6173		UOS Liberty	Anchor handling tug supply vessel modified MOSS 424 h design	15 February 2010		Genova	3.100 t		HARTMANN-REDEREI Leer Germany	
	6174		UOS Navigator	Anchor handling tug supply vessel modified MOSS 424 h design	2008		Genova	3.100 t		HARTMANN-REDEREI Leer Germany	
	6175		UOS Pathfinder	Anchor handling tug supply vessel modified MOSS 424 h design	2008		Genova	3.100 t		HARTMANN-REDEREI Leer Germany	
	6176	9439967	UOS Voyager	Anchor handling tug supply vessel modified MOSS 424 h design	2008		Genova	3.100 t		HARTMANN-REDEREI Leer Germany	
	6177	8768737	Scarabeo 8	semi-submersible drilling rig	1 March 2007	2012	Palermo	35.304 GT		Saipem	
	6178	9437866	MS Silver Spirit	Cruise ship	27 February 2009	2009	Ancona			Silversea Cruises	
	6181	9378450	MS Nieuw Amsterdam	Vista-class cruise ship	30 October 2009	2010	Marghera	86,700 GT		Holland America Line	
	6186		INS Deepak (A50)	Deepak-class fleet tanker	13 February 2010	2011	Sestri Ponente	27.500 t		Indian Navy	
	6187	9477438	MS Queen Elizabeth	Vista-class cruise ship	5 January 2010	2010	Margera	90.901 GT		Cunard Line	
	6188	9479852	Costa Favolosa	Modified Concordia-class cruise ship	6 August 2010	2011	Sestri Ponente	113.216 GT		Costa Crociere	
	6192	9502506	Le Boréal	Cruise ship	1 October 2009	2010	Ancona	10.950 GT		Compagnie du Ponant	
	6194	9438066	MS Marina	Oceania-class cruise ship	4 April 2010	2011	Sestri Ponente	66.000 GT		Oceania Cruises	
	6219		INS Shakti (A57)	Deepak-class fleet tanker	11 October 2010	2011	Sestri Ponente	27.500 t		Indian Navy	

== 2011–2020 ==
Image	Yard number	IMO	Name	Type	Launched	Completed	Shipyard	Tonnage	Capacity	Operator	Note
			Spent Nuclear Fuel Ship	Offshore - special vessel		2011	VARD				
	6145		Carlo Bergamini (F 590)	Bergamini-class frigate	16 July 2011	2013	Riva Trigoso	6.700 t		Italian Navy	
	6146		Virginio Fasan (F 591)	Bergamini-class frigate	31 March 2012	2013	Riva Trigoso	6.700 t		Italian Navy	
	6189	9479864	Costa Fascinosa	Modified Concordia-class cruise ship	29 July 2011	2012	Sestri Ponente	114.500 GT		Costa Crociere	
	6190			Yacht	2009		Muggiano	89 m			
	6193	9502518	L'Austral	Cruise ship	25 March 2010	2011		10.950 GT		Compagnie du Ponant	
	6195	9438078	MS Riviera	Oceania-class cruise ship	16 July 2011	2012	Sestri Ponente	66.084 GT		Oceania Cruises	
		9669861	F.-A.-Gauthier	Ro-Pax ferry	28 June 2014	2015	Castellammare di Stabia	15,901 GT	800 passengers; 180 cars	Société des traversiers du Québec	
	6197		Pietro Venuti (S 528)	Todaro-class submarine	9 October 2014	2016	Muggiano	1.830 t		Italian Navy	
	6198		Romeo Romei (S 529)	Todaro-class submarine	4 July 2015	2016	Muggiano	1.830 t		Italian Navy	
	6201	9555723	Carnival Breeze	Dream-class cruise ship	16 September 2011	2012	Monfalcone	130.000 GT		Carnival Cruise Lines	
	6203	9636888	Costa Diadema	Dream-class cruise ship	15 November 2013	2014	Marghera	132.500 GT		Costa Crociere	
	6209		Carlo Margottini (F 592)	Bergamini-class frigate	29 June 2013	2014	Riva Trigoso	6.700 t		Italian Navy	
	6210		Carabiniere (F 593)	Bergamini-class frigate	29 March 2014	2015	Riva Trigoso	6.700 t		Italian Navy	
	6211		Alpino (F 594)	Bergamini-class frigate	13 December 2014	2016	Riva Trigoso	6.700 t		Italian Navy	
	6212		Luigi Rizzo (F 595)	Bergamini-class frigate	19 December 2015	2017	Riva Trigoso	6.700 t		Italian Navy	
	6213	9531894	Rossita	SNF & RW Carrier	16 December 2010	15 July 2011	Muggiano	2.567 GT		Atomflot Russia's government	Euro 70 millions contract
	6218	1009687	Ocean Victory (yacht)	Yacht	2014	2014	Muggiano	2.242 GT		Viktor Rashnikov	
	6220		Abu Dhabi P191	Abu Dhabi corvette	15 February 2011	2013	Riva Trigoso	1.650 t		United Arab Emirates Navy	
	6221		Ghantoot P251	Falaj 2-class patrol vessel	19 January 2012	2013	Muggiano	550 t		United Arab Emirates Navy	
	6222		Salahah P252	Falaj 2-class patrol vessel	8 June 2012	2013	Muggiano	550 t		United Arab Emirates Navy	
	6223		Royal Princess	Royal-class cruise ship	16 August 2012	2013	Monfalcone	142.714 GT		Princess Cruises	
	6224		Regal Princess	Royal-class cruise ship	26 March 2013	2014	Monfalcone	142.714 GT		Princess Cruises	
	6226		Silver Muse	Cruise ship	1 July 2016	2017	Sestri Ponente	40.000 GT		Silversea Cruises	
	6229	9641675	Le Soléal	Cruise ship	6 December 2012	2013	Ancona	10.950 GT		Compagnie du Ponant	
	6230	9704130	Le Lyrial	Cruise ship	23 October 2014	2015	Ancona	10.700 GT		Compagnie du Ponant	
	6231	9614036	Britannia	Royal-class cruise ship	14 February 2014	2015	Monfalcone	143.700 GT		P&O Cruises	
	6232	9614141	Majestic Princess	Royal-class cruise ship	8 February 2016	30 March 2017	Monfalcone	144.216 GT		Princess Cruises	
	6233	9690418	Luigi Dattilo CP940	Dattilo class patrol vessel OPV	19 December 2012	2013	Castellammare di Stabia	3.600 t		Italian Coast Guard	
	6234		Ubaldo Diciotti CP941	Dattilo class patrol vessel OPV	15 July 2013	2014	Castellammare di Stabia	3.600 t		Italian Coast Guard	
	6235		Kalaat Béni Abbès 474	Kalaat Béni Abbès 474	8 January 2014	2014	Riva Trigoso	8.800 t		Algerian Navy	
	6236	9650418	MV Viking Star	Viking-star class cruise ship	23 June 2014	2015	Marghera	47.800 GT		Viking Ocean Cruises	
	6237	9725421	MV Viking Sea	Viking-star class cruise ship	25 June 2015	2016	Ancona	47.800 GT		Viking Ocean Cruises	
	6241	9692557	MS Koningsdam	Pinnacle-class Cruise ship	31 March 2016	2016	Marghera	99.836 GT		Holland America Line	
	6242	9692569	Carnival Vista	Vista-class cruise ship (Carnival)	25 June 2015	2016	Monfalcone	133.500 GT		Carnival Cruise Line	
		9781190	Kreuz Challenger	Offshore Subsea Construction Vessel (OCSV)		2017	Vard	7,055 GT	3,000 DWT	Kreuz Subsea	
		9817121	Skandi Vinland	Offshore Subsea Construction Vessel (OCSV)		2017	Vard	5,883 GT	2,970 DWT	DOF Subsea Canada	
	6243	9767091	Carnival Horizon	Vista-class cruise ship (Carnival)	10 March 2017	2018	Marghera	133.500 GT		Carnival Cruise Line	
	6244	9767106	MS Nieuw Statendam	Pinnacle-class Cruise ship	6 December 2017	2018	Marghera	99.500 GT		Holland America Line	
	6245		Viking Sky	Cruise ship	23 March 2016	2017	Ancona	47.800 GT		Viking Ocean Cruises	
	6246		Viking Sun	Cruise ship	15 December 2016	2017	Ancona	47.000 GT		Viking Ocean Cruises	
	6247		Federico Martinengo (F 596)	Bergamini-class frigate	2017	2018	Riva Trigoso	6.700 t		Italian Navy	
	6248		Antonio Marceglia (F 597)	Bergamini-class frigate	2017	2019	Riva Trigoso	6.700 t		Italian Navy	
	6250	9703150	Seven Seas Explorer	Explorer-class Cruise ship	30 October 2015	2016	Sestri Ponente	54.000 GT		Regent Seven Seas Cruises	
			Itarus	semi-submersible platform – Nuclear Waste Transport Vessel	19 November 2015	2016	Muggiano	3.000 DWT		RosRAO	
	6251		Seabourn Encore	Encore-class Cruise ship	4 March 2016	2017	Marghera	41.865 GT		Seabourn Cruise Line	
	6253		Viking Orion	Cruise ship	2017	2018	Ancona	47.000 GT		Viking Ocean Cruises	
	6256		MSC Seaside	Seaside-class Cruise ship	26 November 2016	2017	Monfalcone	154.000 GT		MSC Cruises	
	6257	9745378	MSC Seaview	Seaside-class Cruise ship	23 August 2017	4 June 2018	Monfalcone	153.516 GT		MSC Cruises	
	6258		Seabourn Ovation	Encore-class Cruise ship	2017	2018	Sestri Ponente	41.865 GT		Seabourn Cruise Line	
	6259		Vulcano	LSS Vulcano	2017	2019	Riva Trigoso	23.500 t		Italian Navy	
	6260		Trieste	LHD Trieste	2019	2024	Castellammare di Stabia	33.000 t		Italian Navy	
			Jorge Amado	Specialized carrying vessel		2018	VARD				
			Topaz Ruza	Specialized carrying vessel		2018	VARD				
			Topaz Zeya	Specialized carrying vessel		2018	VARD				
			Sunkar	Specialized carrying vessel		2018	VARD				
			Polar Research Vessel	Special vessel - icebreaker		2018	VARD				
			Island Diligence	Service Operation Vessel (SOV)		2018	VARD				
			Antarctic Endurance	Offshore fishing vessel		2018	VARD				
			Lady Anne Marie	Offshore vessel - live fish carrier		2018	VARD				
			Multi Innovator	Offshore special vessel - freight and service vessel		2018	VARD				
			Topaz Tiamat	Offshore Subsea Construction Vessel (OCSV)		2019	Vard Brattvaag	3,000 DWT	82 persons	Topaz Energy and Marine	
			Skandi Olinda	Offshore Subsea Construction Vessel (OCSV)		2019	VARD	10,800 DWT	120 persons	DOF / TechnipFMC	
			Multi Provider	Offshore special vessel - freight and service vessel		2019	VARD				
			Bergey	Offshore fishing vessel		2019	VARD				
			Askell	Offshore fishing vessel		2019	VARD				
			Vestmannaey	Offshore fishing vessel		2019	VARD				
			Ragnhild Kristine	Offshore fishing vessel		2019	VARD				
			Vordur	Offshore fishing vessel		2019	VARD				
		9801689	Costa Venezia	Cruise ship	22 June 2018	2019	Monfalcone	135,500 GT	5,200+ passengers	Costa Crociere	
	841	9792539	Topaz Tangaroa	Offshore Subsea Construction Vessel (OCSV)	18 March 2017	2019	Vard Brattvaag	6,133 GT	3,303 DWT	Topaz Energy and Marine	
	6287	9804801	Scarlet Lady	Cruise ship	8 February 2019	2020	Sestri Ponente	108,192 GT	2,770 passengers; 1,160 crew	Virgin Voyages	
			Rem Power	Offshore Subsea Construction Vessel (OCSV)		2020	VARD		120 persons	Rem Offshore	
			Norwind Gale	Commissioning service operation vessel (CSOV)		2020	VARD			Norwind Offshore	
			Antarctic Aurora	Offshore fishing vessel		2020	VARD				
			Remøybuen	Offshore fishing vessel		2020	VARD				
			Senja	Offshore fishing vessel		2020	VARD				
			Kongsfjord	Offshore fishing vessel		2020	VARD				
			Utnefjord	Ferry		2020	Vard / Havyard	264 DWT	199 persons	Norled	
	831	9745615	Island Victory	Anchor handling tug supply vessel	24 February 2017	2020	Vard Langsten	11,387 GT	5,866 DWT	Island Offshore	
	6272		Carnival Panorama	Vista-class cruise ship (Carnival)	6 December 2018	2019	Marghera	133.868 GT		Carnival Cruise Line	
	6268	9802396	Sky Princess	Royal-class cruise ship	14 February 2019	2019	Monfalcone	145.000 GT	4.610 passengers	Princess Cruises	
			Viking Jupiter	Cruise ship		2019	Ancona	47.800 GT	930 passengers	Viking Ocean Cruises	
	6273	9801691	Costa Firenze	Cruise ship	6 November 2019	2020	Marghera	135.500 GT	5.200+ passengers	Costa Crociere	
		9807126	Enchanted Princess	Royal-class cruise ship		2020	Monfalcone	145.000 GT	4.610 passengers	Princess Cruises	
	6276		Spartaco Schergat (F 598)	Bergamini-class frigate	2019	2020	Riva Trigoso	6.700 t		Italian Navy	
	6277		Emilio Bianchi (F 599)	Bergamini-class frigate	2020	2021	Riva Trigoso	6.700 t		Italian Navy	
			MV Yara Birkeland	Container ship		2020	VARD				

== 2021–present ==
Image	Yard number	IMO	Name	Type	Launched	Completed	Shipyard	Tonnage	Capacity	Operator	Note
	6261		Paolo Thaon di Revel	PPA, Pattugliatori Polivalenti d'Altura	2019	2021	Riva Trigoso	5.900 t		Italian Navy	
	6262		PPA2	PPA, Pattugliatori Polivalenti d'Altura	2020	2022	Riva Trigoso	5.900 t		Italian Navy	
	6263		PPA3	PPA, Pattugliatori Polivalenti d'Altura	2021	2023	Riva Trigoso	6.300 t		Italian Navy	
		9805336	Valiant Lady	Cruise ship	8 January 2020	2021	Sestri Ponente	108,192 GT	2,770 passengers; 1,160 crew	Virgin Voyages	
		9843792	MSC Seashore	Cruise ship	20 August 2020	2021	Monfalcone	170.000 GT	5.632 passengers	MSC Cruises	
		9833175	Viking Venus	Cruise ship		2021	Ancona	47.800 GT	930 passengers	Viking Ocean Cruises	
	6289	9805348	Resilient Lady	Cruise ship		2022	Sestri Ponente	108.232 GT	2.770 passengers	Virgin Voyages	
		9843807	MSC Seascape	Cruise ship		2022	Monfalcone	170.400 GT	5.632 passengers	MSC Cruises	
		9833187	Viking Mars	Cruise ship		2022	Ancona	47.800 GT	930 passengers	Viking Ocean Cruises	
		9845910	Viking Neptune	Cruise ship		2022	Ancona	47.800 GT	930 passengers	Viking Ocean Cruises	
			Island Discoverer	Platform supply vessel		2021	VARD				
			Luntos	Offshore fishing vessel		2021	VARD				
			Matre	Ferry		2021	Vard / Havyard	199 DWT	199 persons	Norled	
			Al Zubarah	Corvette	27 February 2020	2021	Muggiano		112 persons	Qatari Emiri Navy	
			Al Khor	Corvette	30 September 2021	2022	Muggiano		112 persons	Qatari Emiri Navy	
			Damsah	Corvette	13 February 2021	2022	Muggiano		112 persons	Qatari Emiri Navy	
			Breidtind	Offshore fishing vessel		2022	VARD		25 persons		
			Akraberg	Offshore fishing vessel		2022	VARD				
	6298	9823986	Norwegian Prima	Prima-class cruise ship	2021	2022	Marghera	143.535 GT		Norwegian Cruise Line	
			Francesco Morosini (P 431)	Multipurpose offshore patrol vessel	22 May 2020	2022	Riva Trigoso - Muggiano	4,880 t light; 5,830 t full displacement	120 crew; 173 beds	Italian Navy	
			Raimondo Montecuccoli (P 432)	Multipurpose offshore patrol vessel	13 March 2021	2023	Riva Trigoso - Muggiano	4,912 t light; 5,880 t full displacement	120 crew; 173 beds	Italian Navy	
			Musherib	Offshore patrol vessel	18 September 2020	2022	Muggiano	745 t displacement	38 crew	Qatari Emiri Navy	
			Sheraouh	Offshore patrol vessel	5 June 2021	2022	Muggiano	745 t displacement	38 crew	Qatari Emiri Navy	
			Sumaysimah	Amphibious assault ship	29 March 2022	2023	Muggiano		112 persons	Qatari Emiri Navy	
			Al Fulk	Amphibious assault ship	24 January 2023	2024	Muggiano	8,800 t displacement	150 crew; 400+ troops	Qatari Emiri Navy	
		9962445	MV Mark W. Barker	Lake Freighter	7 July 2022	27 July 2022	Bay Shipbuilding	26.000 GT		Interlake Steamship Company	First Jones Act-compliant ship built on the Great Lakes since 1983.
	6319	9869875	Explora I	Cruise ship	30 May 2022	2023	Monfalcone	63,621 GT	996 passengers	Explora Journeys	
			KV Jan Mayen	Coast guard vessel		2023	Vard Langsten			Norwegian Coast Guard	
			KV Bjørnøya	Coast guard vessel		2023	Vard Langsten			Norwegian Coast Guard	
			KV Hopen	Coast guard vessel		2024	Vard Langsten			Norwegian Coast Guard	
			Calypso 2023	Cable-laying ships		2023	VARD				
			Grampian Tyne	Service operation vessel (SOV)		2023	VARD			North Star Renewables	
			Grampian Derwent	Service operation vessel (SOV)		2023	VARD			North Star Renewables	
			Grampian Tees	Service operation vessel (SOV)		2023	VARD			North Star Renewables	
	6264		PPA4	PPA, Pattugliatori Polivalenti d'Altura	2022	2024	Riva Trigoso	5.900 t		Italian Navy	
	6265		PPA5	PPA, Pattugliatori Polivalenti d'Altura	2022	2024	Riva Trigoso	5.900 t		Italian Navy	
	6266		PPA6	PPA, Pattugliatori Polivalenti d'Altura	2023	2025	Riva Trigoso	5.900 t		Italian Navy	
	6267		PPA7	PPA, Pattugliatori Polivalenti d'Altura	2024	2026	Riva Trigoso	6.300 t		Italian Navy	
	6274	9839399	MS Queen Anne	Cruise ship	24 April 2023	2024	Marghera	114,188 GT	2,996 passengers	Cunard Line	
			Giovanni delle Bande Nere (P 434)	Multipurpose combat ship	12 February 2022	2024	Riva Trigoso - Muggiano	4,994 t; 6,270 t full displacement	173 beds	Italian Navy	
		9823998	Norwegian Viva	Cruise ship		2023	Marghera	143.535 GT	3.100 passengers	Norwegian Cruise Line	
		9845922	Viking Saturn	Cruise ship		2023	Ancona	47.800 GT	930 passengers	Viking Ocean Cruises	
		9876957	Vista	Cruise ship		2023	Sestri Ponente	67.000 GT	1.200 passengers	Oceania Cruises	
		9852432	Viking Vela	Cruise ship		2024	Ancona	54.300 GT	998 passengers	Viking Ocean Cruises	
	6320	9869887	Explora II	Explora-class cruise ship	6 September 2023	2024	Sestri Ponente	63.900 GT	996 passengers	Explora Journeys	
			Norwind Hurricane	Commissioning service operation vessel (CSOV)		2024	VARD			Norwind Offshore	
			Norwind Helm	Commissioning service operation vessel (CSOV)		2024	VARD			Norwind Offshore	
		9824007	Norwegian Aqua	Cruise ship		2025	Marghera	154,140 GT	3,571 passengers	Norwegian Cruise Line	
			Atlante	Logistic support ship	18 May 2024	2025	Castellammare di Stabia	27,000 t displacement	235 persons	Italian Navy	
			KRI Brawijaya	Frigate	25 January 2024	2025	Riva Trigoso - Muggiano	6,700 t full displacement		Indonesian Navy	
			KRI Prabu Siliwangi	Frigate	2024	2025	Riva Trigoso - Muggiano	6,700 t full displacement		Indonesian Navy	
			Monna Lisa	Cable-laying ships		2025	Vard				
	6312	9862657	Mein Schiff Relax	Cruise ship	28 November 2023	2025	Monfalcone	157,651 GT	3,984 passengers; 1,400 crew	TUI Cruises	
		9876969	Allura	Cruise ship		2025	Sestri Ponente	67.817 GT	1.200 passengers	Oceania Cruises	
		9862669	Mein Schiff Flow	Cruise ship		2026	Monfalcone	160.000 GT		TUI Cruises	
			Ugolino Vivaldi	Multipurpose offshore patrol vessel		2026	Riva Trigoso - Muggiano			Italian Navy	
			Costanza I di Sicilia	Ro-Pax ferry		2026	Palermo			Regione Siciliana - Caronte & Tourist	
