= Comandanti-class patrol vessel =

2004 class of Italian patrol boats

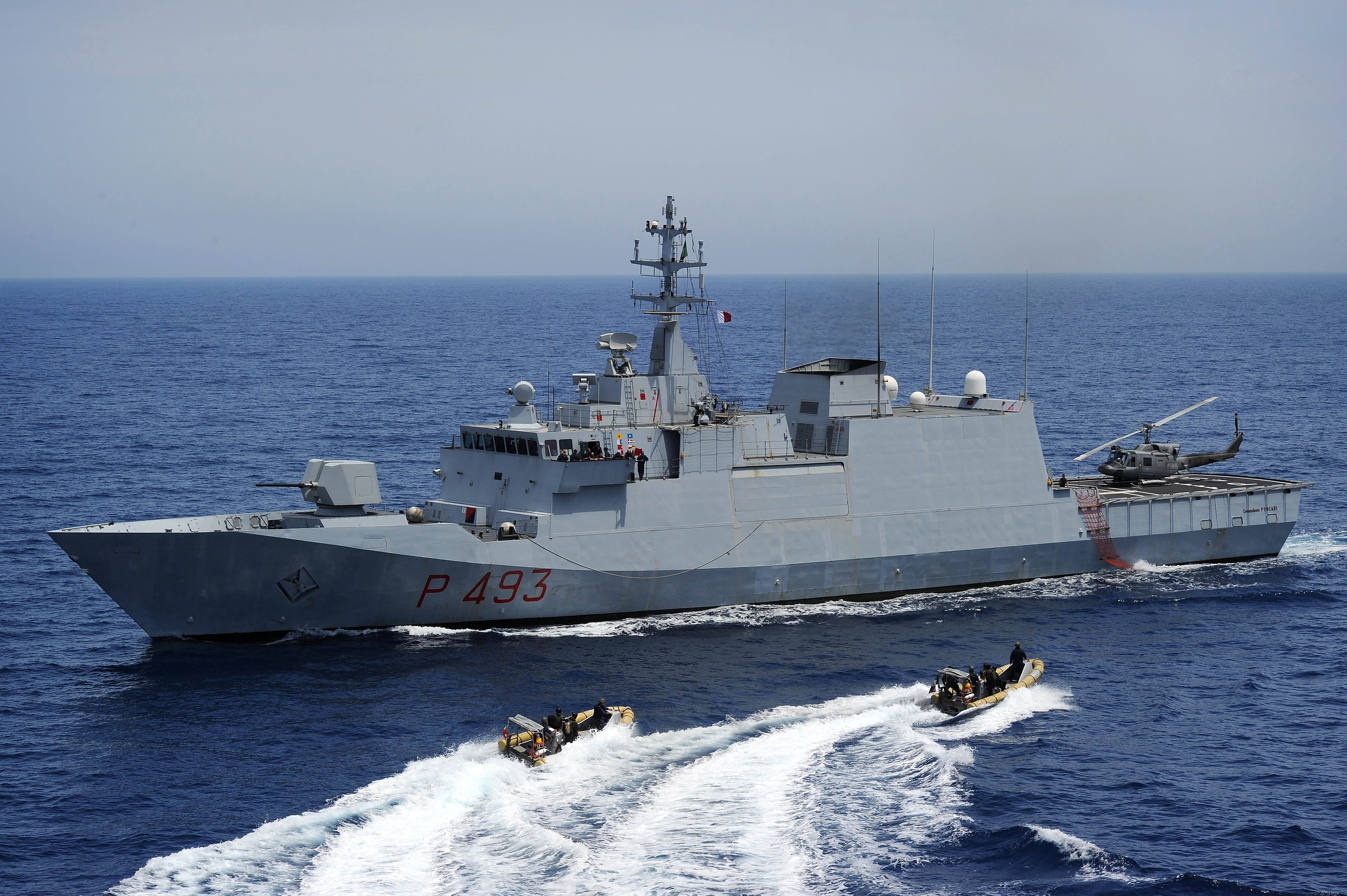
- Comandante Foscari in the Mediterranean Sea in 2010

Class overview
- Name: Comandanti class
- Builders: Fincantieri, Riva Trigoso (La Spezia)
- Operators: Italian Navy
- Preceded by: Nibbio hydrofoils
- Cost: €362 million for 4 vessels (FY 2000); €90.5 million per unit (FY 2000)
- In commission: 2004
- Planned: 4
- Completed: 4
- Active: 4

General characteristics
- Type: Patrol vessel
- Displacement: 1,520 t (1,500 long tons), full load
- Length: 88.6 m (291 ft) LOA; 80.0 m (262.5 ft) LPP.
- Beam: 12.2 m (40 ft)
- Draught: 3.37 m (11.1 ft)
- Propulsion: - CODAD scheme; - 2 shaft and 2 propellers with variable-pitch; - 2 x rudders; - 2 x active-fin stabilizers; - 2 x diesel engines Wärtsilä-NSD W18-V-26 XN (6,480 kW (8,690 hp) each); - 3 x diesel engine generators Isotta Fraschini V1712-T2-M2, 900 kW (1,200 hp) each, with 3 Magneti Marelli M7R500SA4 (1125 kVA)
- Speed: 25 knots (46 km/h; 29 mph)
- Range: 3,500 nautical miles (6,500 km; 4,000 mi) at 14 knots (26 km/h; 16 mph)
- Complement: 70
- Sensors & processing systems: 1 x Selex ES RAN-30X/I (RASS) - MM/SPS-791 - multi-mode radar operating at X band, search radar with over-the-horizon (OTH) detection mode; 2 x navigation radar GEM Elettronica SPN-753 (since 2012, GEM Elettronica Gemini-DB, X/Ku dual band radar); 1 x Selex ES NA-25 (Dardo-F) fire control system with Selex ES RTN-25X, X-band radar; since 2012, Selex ES JANUS-N IRST system; Selex ES CMS; Elmer Integrated Communication System; since 2012, Leonardo-FinmeccanicaTDL M-DLP link 11/16/22
- Electronic warfare & decoys: Elettronica Spa ESM/ECM SLQ-747 system
- Armament: 1 x Oto Melara 76/62 mm SR (Super Rapido) gun; 2 x OTO Melara 25/80 guns with Oerlikon KBA 25mm
- Aircraft carried: 1×SH-90A helicopter
- Aviation facilities: retractable hangar for SH-90A class helicopter
- Notes: 2 x RHIB Stemar

The Comandanti class of patrol vessels consists of four units operated by the Italian Navy, named as Nuove Unità Minori Combattenti (NUMC)

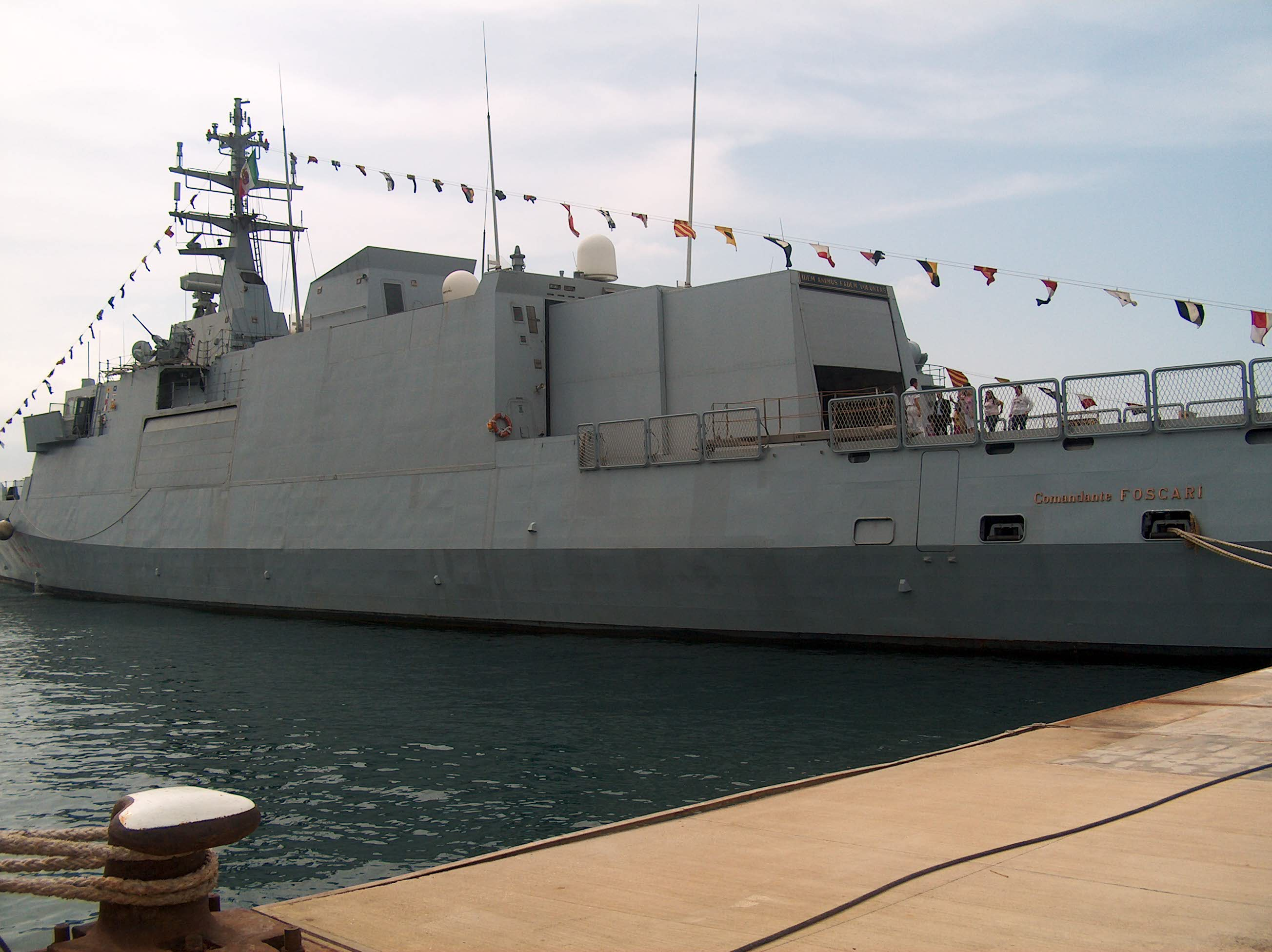
Comandante Foscari berthed in Augusta (Siracusa)

== Features ==
The construction of these units used hull and superstructure built with stealth features. The NUMC (Comandanti class) and Nuove Unità di Pattugliamento d'Altura, NUPA (Sirio class) share logistics, interoperability, features of the combat system and integrated telecommunications systems.

== Ships ==
These units operate in conjunction with NUMA of COMFORPAT, the Forces Command patrol for surveillance and Coastal Defence and have their operational base in Augusta. They serve as coastal patrol and traffic control, cargo and surveillance in immigration control.
Comandante Foscari is used for trials on new versions of Oto Melara 76/62 mm Strales/Davide gun:

- October 2004: new stealth shield for gun;
- November 2009: to La Spezia beginning “DAVIDE/DART” program trials, with boarding of the Oto Melara 76/62 mm Strales/Davide prototype.

Italian Navy - Comandanti class
Name	Pennant number	Hull number	Laid down	Launched	Completed	Commissioned	Motto
Comandante Cigala Fulgosi	P 490	6061	25 June 1999	7 October 2000	31 July 2001	31 January 2004	Virtutis Fortuna Comes
Comandante Borsini	P 491	6062	21 July 1999	17 February 2001	3 December 2001	31 January 2004	Vincit Amor Patria
Comandante Bettica	P 492	6063	1 March 2000	26 June 2001	4 April 2002	31 January 2004	Con ardire e con tenacia
Comandante Foscari	P 493	6064	1 September 2000	24 November 2001	2 August 2002	31 January 2004	idem animus eadem voluntas
