= Ocean Princess =

Ocean Princess may refer to the following cruise ships:

- Ocean Princess (2000), operated by Princess Cruises 2000–2002
- Ocean Princess (2009)
