= Margera family =

The Margera family:

- Bam Margera - Skateboarder and star of CKY, Jackass, and Viva La Bam.
- Phil Margera - Bam's father and a baker by profession
- April Margera - Bam's mother
- Jess Margera - Bam's older brother and drummer of the band CKY
- Vincent "Don Vito" Margera - Bam's uncle
