= ORV Sagar Nidhi =

Indian research vessel

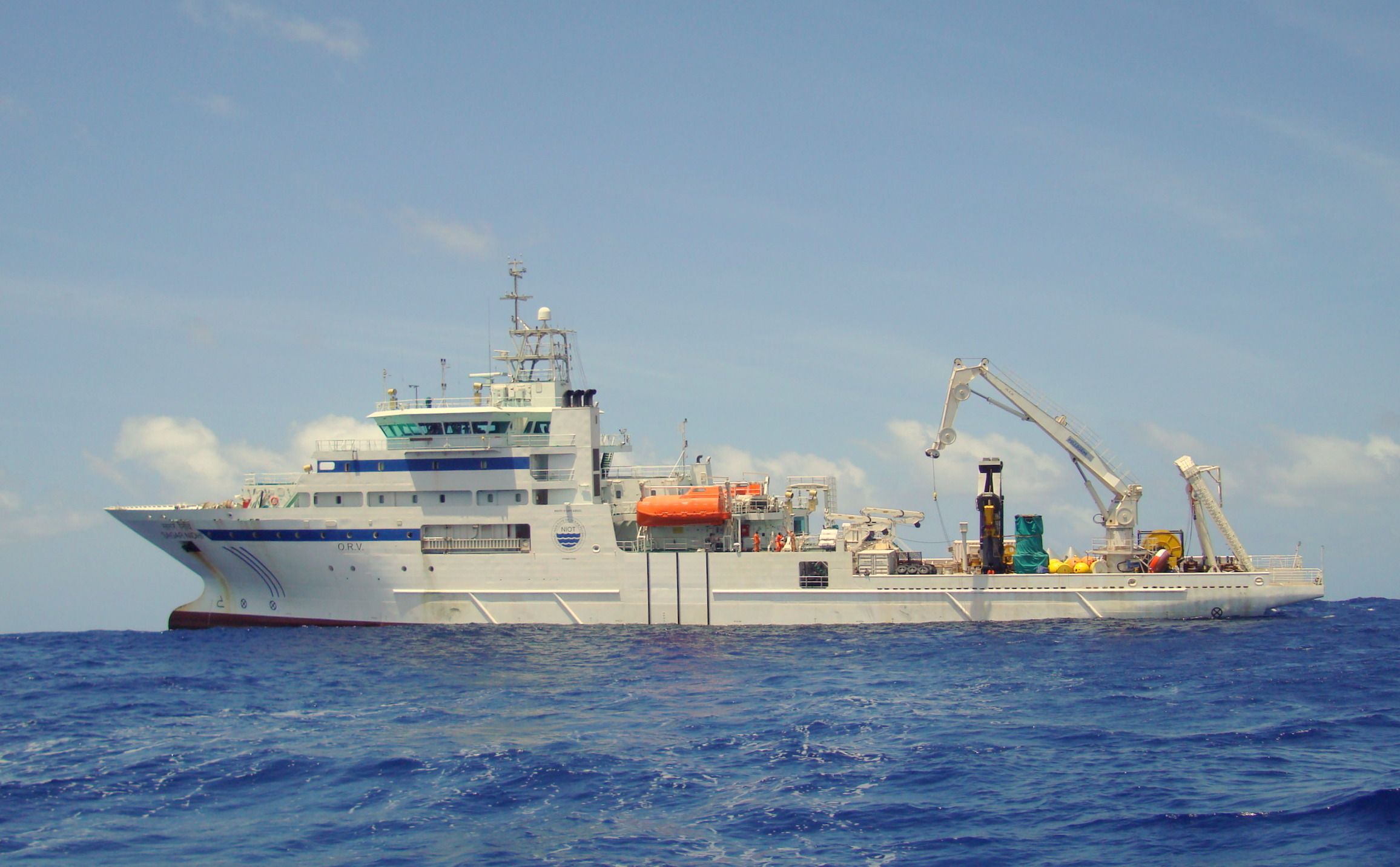
ORV Sagar Nidhi

ORV Sagar Nidhi is an ice-strengthened multidisciplinary vessel operated by the National Institute of Ocean Technology, India. It was constructed at Fincantieri, Italy. The 104-metre-long vessel has fully automatic diesel-electric propulsion equipped with dynamic positioning system, azimuth thrusters, and a winch to hoist 60 tonnes from a depth of 6,000 metres.

The vessel is capable of carrying out geo-scientific, meteorological and oceanographic research, and is designed with blue-water capability with ranges of up to 10,000 nautical miles (19,000 km) for voyages lasting up to 45 days. She is expected to support research in the Indian and Antarctic Oceans.

Sagar Nidhi will be utilized for deep sea mining, launching of ROV's, AUV's, crewed and uncrewed submersibles, and exploration of gas hydrates.
