= Siremar =

Italian shipping company

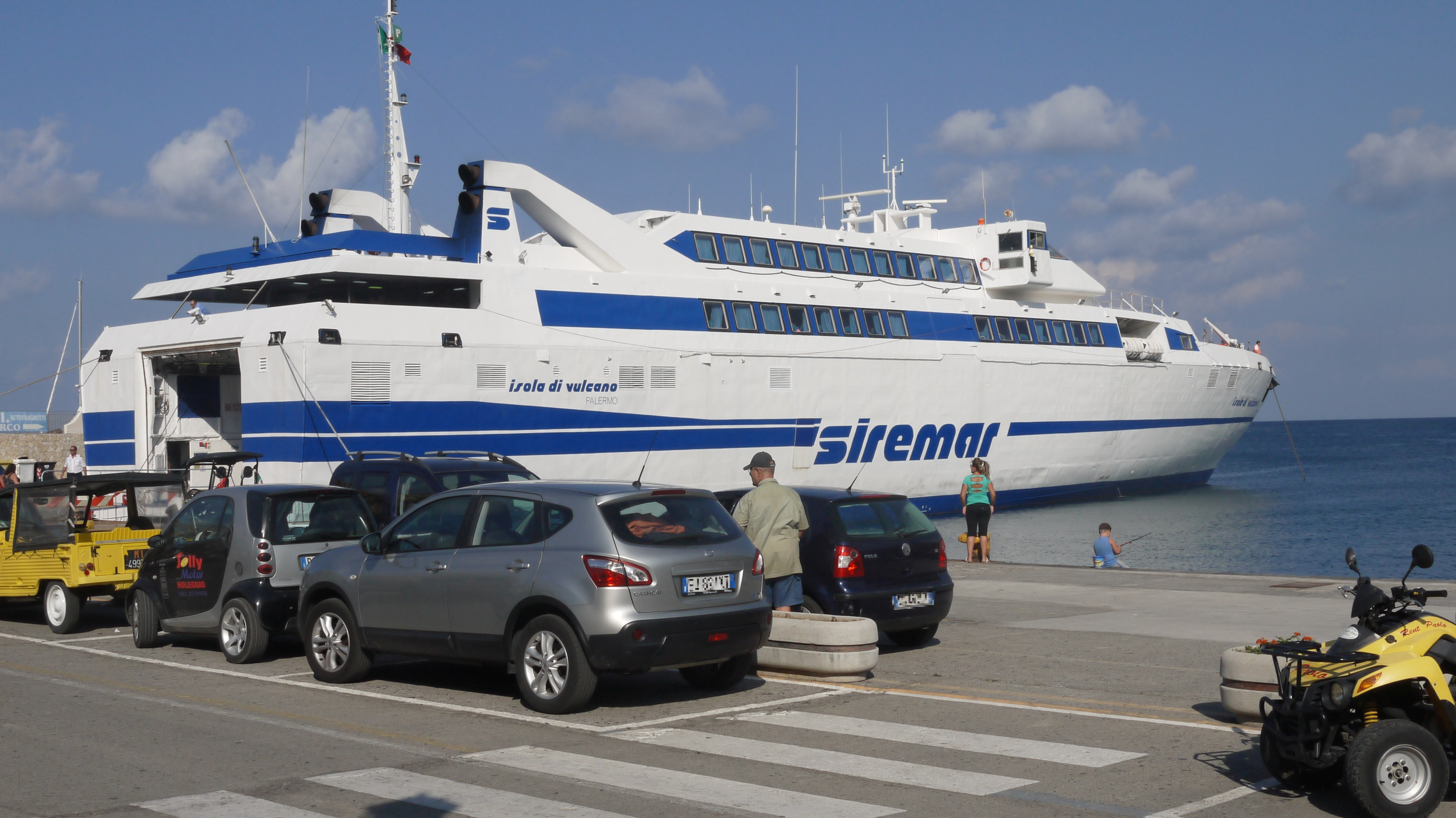
- HSC Isola di Vulcano at Vulcano island
- Industry: Passenger transportation
- Founded: 1975
- Headquarters: Milazzo, Sicily, Italy
- Area served: Tyrrhenian Sea
- Parent: Compagnia delle Isole
- Website: carontetourist.it/it/siremar

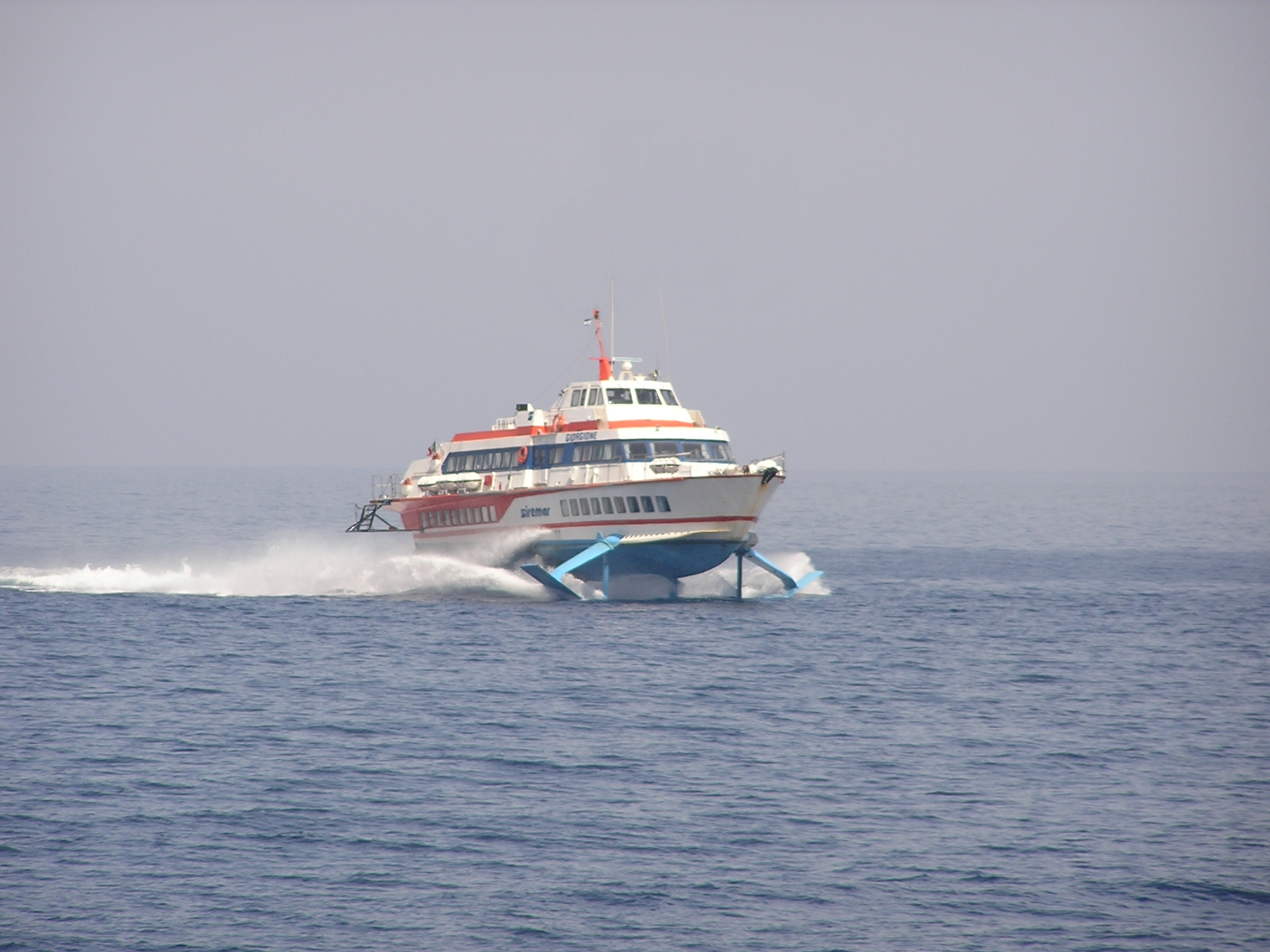
Giorgione hydrofoil

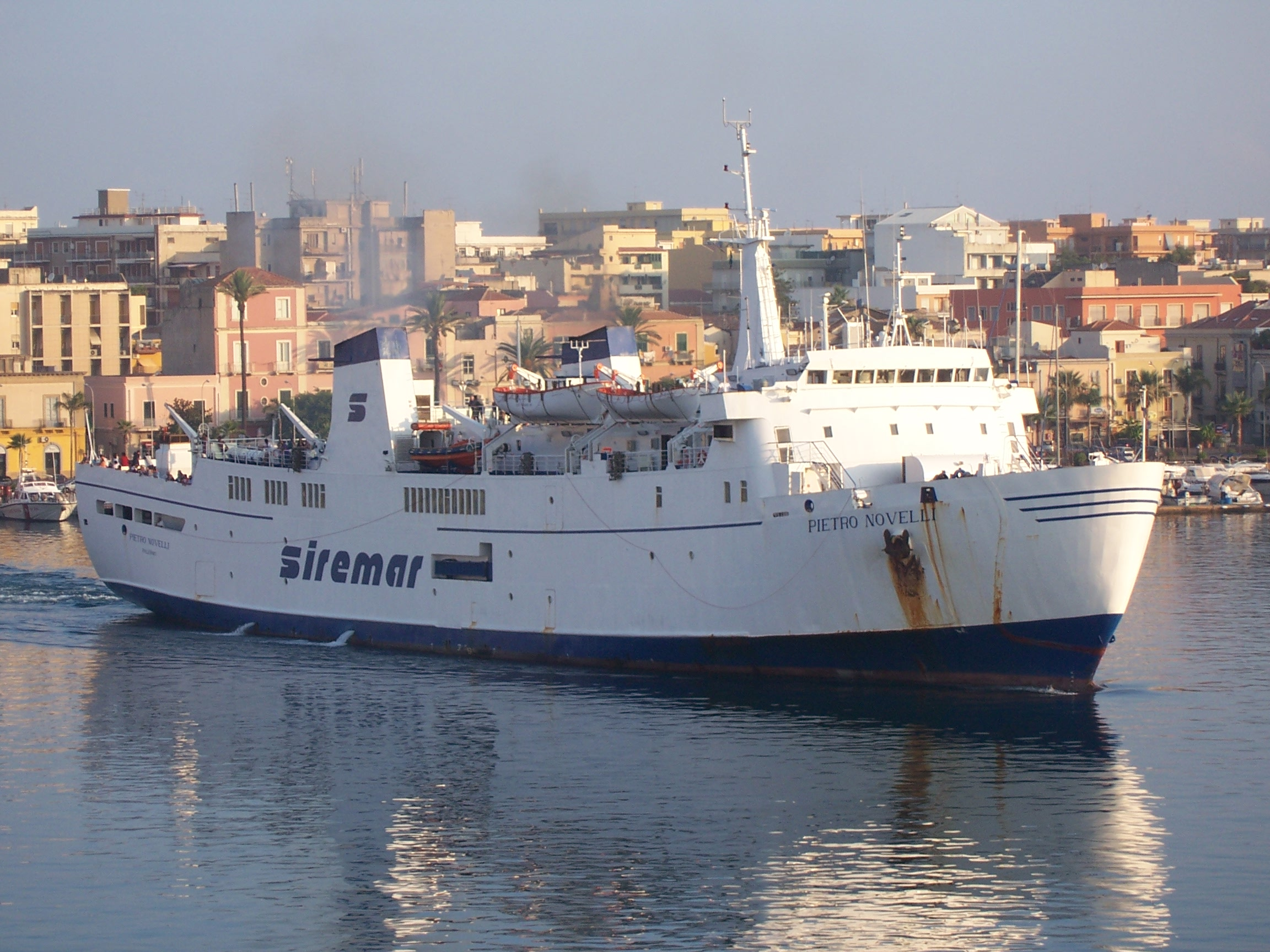
MS Pietro Novelli to Milazzo harbour.

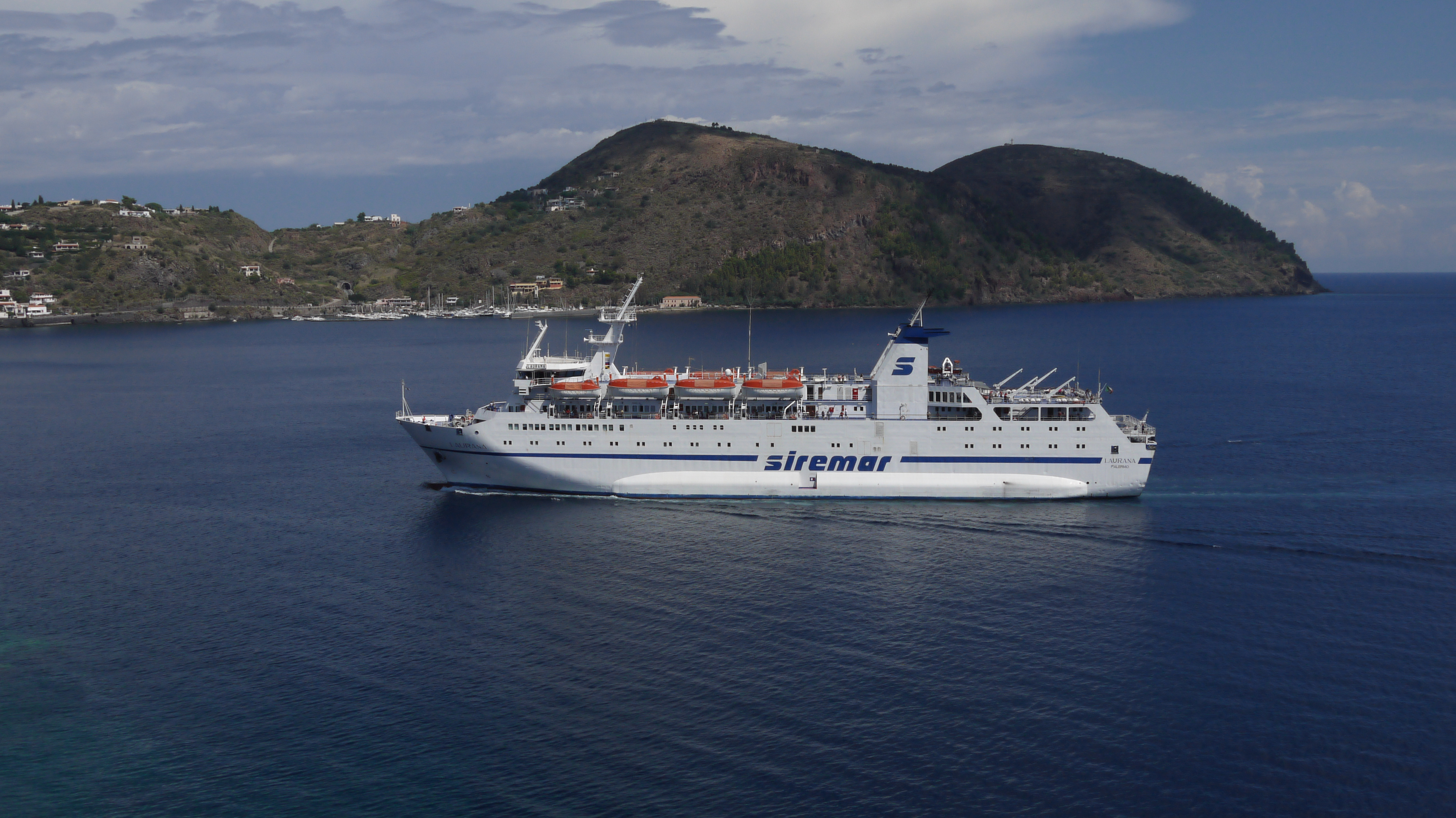
The Laurana near Lipari harbour.

House flag of Siremar

Siremar (Sicilia Regionale Marittima) is an Italian shipping company, until 2011 a subdivision of state-owned Tirrenia di Navigazione and now privatized, which operates in routes from Sicily to Aeolian Islands, Aegadian Islands, Ustica, Pantelleria, Linosa and Lampedusa. It also connects Milazzo, Naples and the Eolie Islands.

== Fleet ==
=== Ships ===
Name	Tonnage	Passengers	Car capacity / l.m.	Speed Knots	Type
Sansovino	10997	800	272	17	Ferry
Laurana	10997	800	272	17	Ferry
Paolo Veronese	2894	673	93	18	Ferry
Pietro Novelli	2352	578	93	18	Ferry
Antonello da Messina	1555	673	93	16	Ferry
Filippo Lippi	1555	795	70	18	Ferry
Simone Martini	1494	797	70	16.5	Ferry
Vesta	1494	985	60	16.5	Ferry
Sibilla	1494	985	60	16.5	Ferry
Isola di Vulcano	1925	800	57	32	Fast Ferry
Isola di Stromboli	4426	800	168	28	Fast Ferry

=== Hydrofoils ===
(From 2016 belonging to Liberty Lines)

Name	Tonnage	Passengers	Speed Knots	Type
Calypso	194	238	37	F/Master
Antioco	194	238	37	F/Master
Eschilo	194	238	37	F/Master
Eraclide	194	238	37	F/Master
Platone	194	238	37	F/Master
Atanis	194	238	40	F/Master
Tiziano	259	242	40	F/Master
Mantegna	224	210	40	Rhs 160/f
Masaccio	224	210	40	Rhs 160/f

== Routes ==
- Naples↔Stromboli↔Ginostra↔Panarea↔Rinella↔Santa Marina Salina↔Lipari↔Vulcano↔Milazzo (Ferry route, Laurana)
- Milazzo↔Vulcano↔Lipari↔Santa Marina Salina↔Rinella↔Filicudi↔Alicudi (ferry route, Pietro Novelli)
- Milazzo↔Vulcano↔Lipari↔Santa Marina Salina↔Rinella↔Panarea↔Ginostra↔Stromboli (ferry route, Isola di Stromboli / Pietro Novelli)
- Milazzo↔Vulcano↔Lipari↔Santa Marina Salina↔Rinella↔Filicudi↔Alicudi (hydrofoil route)
- Milazzo↔Vulcano↔Lipari↔Santa Marina Salina↔Rinella↔Panarea↔Ginostra↔Stromboli (hydrofoil route)
- Trapani↔Favignana↔Levanzo↔Marettimo
- Palermo↔Ustica
- Trapani↔Pantelleria
- Porto Empedocle↔Linosa
- Porto Empedocle↔Lampedusa
