= Sirio-class patrol vessel =

Italian naval ship class

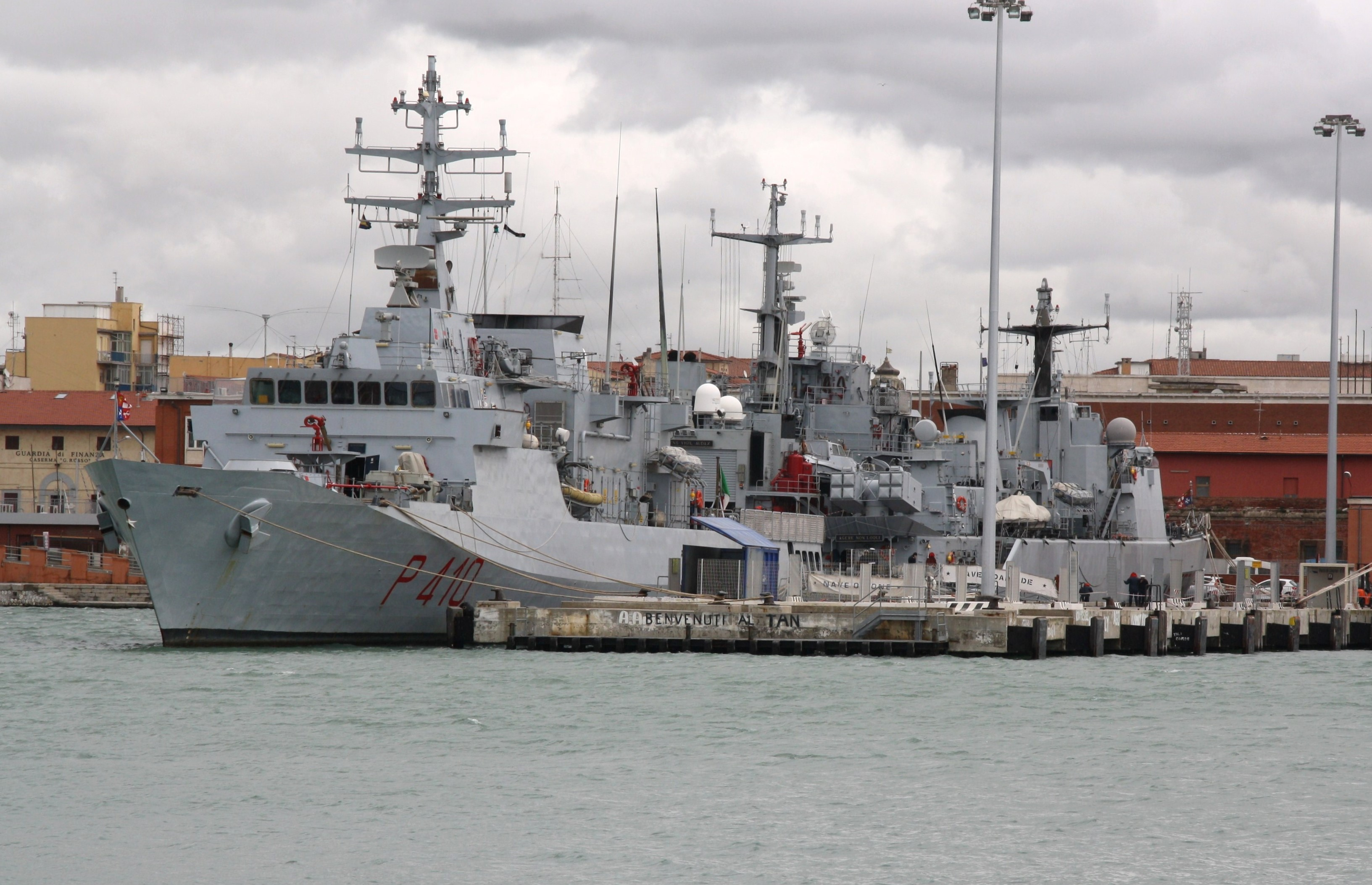
- Orione (P 410)

Class overview
- Name: Sirio class
- Builders: Fincantieri, Riva Trigoso and Muggiano (La Spezia)
- Operators: Italian Navy
- Cost: €150 million (2000) for 2 units; €75 million (2000) per unit
- In commission: 2002
- Completed: 2
- Active: 2

General characteristics
- Type: Patrol vessel
- Displacement: 1,548.6 t (1,524.1 long tons) full load
- Length: 88.6 m (290 ft 8 in) LOA; 80.0 m (262 ft 6 in) LPP
- Beam: 12.2 m (40 ft 0 in)
- Draught: 3.84 m (12 ft 7 in); depth 8.2 m (26 ft 11 in)
- Propulsion: - 2 shaft and 2 variable-pitch propellers; - 2 x rudders; - 2 x active-fin stabilizers; - 2 x Wärtsilä-NSD W12-V-26 XN diesel engines (4,320 kW (5,790 hp) each); - 3 x Isotta Fraschini V1708 T2 M2 diesel generators (600 kW (800 hp) each)
- Speed: 22 knots (41 km/h; 25 mph)
- Range: 3,300 nmi (6,100 km; 3,800 mi) at 17 knots (31 km/h; 20 mph)
- Complement: 72
- Sensors & processing systems: 1 × Selex ES RAN-30X/I (RASS) - MM/SPS-791 - multi-mode radar operating at X band, search radar with over-the-horizon (OTH) detection mode; 2 × navigation radar GEM Elettronica SPN-753 (since 2012, GEM Elettronica Gemini-DB, X/Ku dual band radar); since 2012, Selex ES JANUS-N IRST system; Selex ES CMS; Elmer Integrated Communication System; since 2012, Leonardo-Finmeccanica TDL M-DLP link 11/16/22
- Armament: 2 × OTO Melara 25/80 guns with Oerlikon KBA 25mm. Predisposizione per 1 cannone Oto Melara 76/62 super rapido a prua
- Aviation facilities: flight deck for an NH-90 helicopter
- Notes: 2 × RHIB

The Sirio class of patrol vessels consists of two units operated by the Italian Navy named Costellazioni II series or Nuove Unità di Pattugliamento d'Altura (NUPA). These vessels were financed by the Italian Department of Transport and Navigation, under law 413/1998, for maritime economic zone surveillance, antipollution, and rescue operations.

== Description ==
The construction of these units is based largely on that of the Nuove Unità Minori Combattenti (NUMC); the hull and superstructure incorporate stealth features. The NUMC and Nuove Unità di Pattugliamento d'Altura (NUPA) share logistics, interoperability, features of the combat system and integrated telecommunications systems.

Each unit has two Wärtsilä NSD- W12-26 V-XN diesel engines providing 8,640 kW (11,590 hp) to two variable-pitch propellers. The ships have a top speed of 23 knots (43 km/h; 26 mph) and a range of 3,300 nautical miles (6,100 km; 3,800 mi) at 14 knots (26 km/h; 16 mph). Three Isotta Fraschini 1708 T2 M2 600 kW (800 hp) diesel generators each power the on-board electronics.

The armament consists of two Oerlikon KBA-Alenia Oto Melara 25 mm (0.98 in)/80 guns with the provision to bow mount an OTO Melara 76 mm (3.0 in)/62 Super Rapid gun. Each unit can embark a single helicopter, either an AB-212 ASW or SH-90A NFH, but the ships lack hangars. For antipollution roles, vessels are fitted with: skimmers, 330 m^{3} (87,000 US gal; 73,000 imp gal) of recovered oils tankers, 32 m^{3} (8,500 US gal; 7,000 imp gal) of chemical dispersants and one chemical laboratory.

== Ships ==
The two units, built in Muggiano and Riva Trigoso bear the names of two World War II torpedo boats of the Italian Royal Navy. These units operate in conjunction with NUMC COMSQUAPAT1 of COMFORPAT, the Forces Command patrol for surveillance and Coastal Defence and have their operational base in Augusta. They serve as coastal patrol and traffic control, cargo and surveillance in immigration control.

Italian Navy - Sirio class
Name	Pennant number	Shipyard	Laid down	Launched	Commissioned	Motto	Status
Sirio	P 409	Fincantieri; Riva Trigoso completed at Muggiano	2001	11 May 2002	30 May 2003	Sidus Vigilans	
Orione	P 410	Fincantieri; Riva Trigoso completed at Muggiano	29 November 2001	27 July 2002	1 August 2003	Lumen et fides	
