= Sparviero-class patrol boat =

Ship class

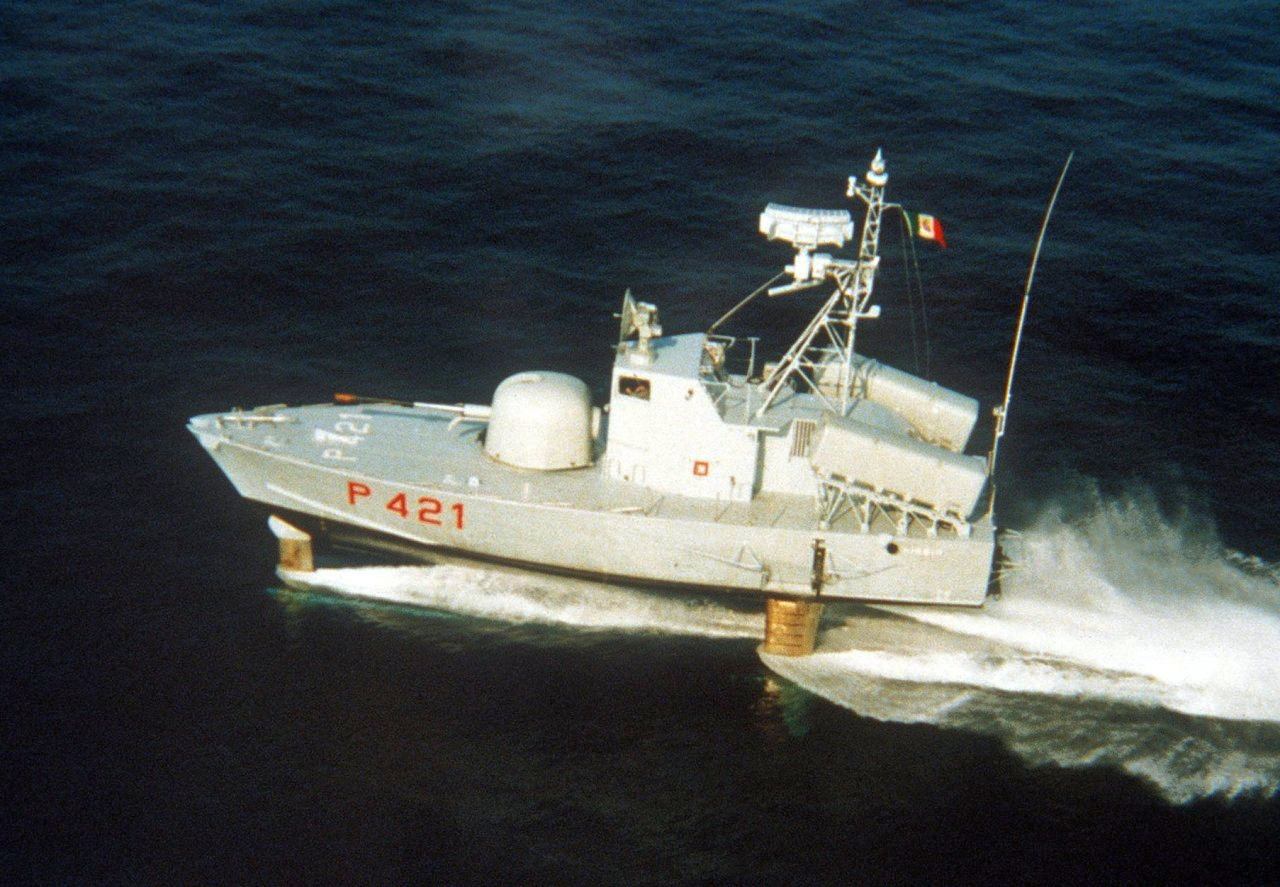
- Italian Sparviero-class hydrofoil Nibbio underway

Class overview
- Builders: Fincantieri, Sumitomo
- Operators: Italian Navy; Japan Maritime Self-Defense Force
- Built: 1973–1983 (Italy); 1991–1995 (Japan)
- In commission: 1974–2010
- Planned: 11
- Completed: 11
- Active: 0
- Retired: 11
- Preserved: 1

General characteristics Sparveiero class
- Type: Fast attack hydrofoil
- Displacement: 60.6 tons full load
- Length: 22.95 m (75 ft 4 in) 24.56 m (80 ft 7 in) (hydrofoils retracted)
- Beam: 7.01 m (23 ft 0 in)
- Draught: 1.87 m (6 ft 2 in) 1.45 m (4 ft 9 in) (on foils at speed)
- Propulsion: CODAG 1 × Rolls-Royce Proteus 15 M560 gas turbine driving waterjet, 3,761 kW (5,044 shp) 1 × Isotta-Fraschini ID38N6V diesel, 1 propeller, 220 kW (290 bhp)
- Speed: 93 km/h (50 kn)
- Range: 740 km (400 nmi) at 45 kn (83 km/h) 1,940 km (1,050 nmi) at 8 knots (15 km/h)
- Complement: 8 enlisted plus 2 officers
- Sensors & processing systems: SMA SPQ 701 navigation radar AESN SPG-70 fire control radar
- Armament: 1 × Otobreda 76 mm gun; 2 × Otomat Anti-ship missiles; Or; 1 × M61 Vulcan; 4 × Type 90 Ship-to-Ship Missiles; (JMSDF loadout)

The Sparviero class, also known as the Nibbio class, are small hydrofoil missile boats capable of traveling at speeds of 46 knots (85 km/h; 53 mph). They were designed for and formerly used by the Italian Navy. The Japanese 1-go-class missile boat is an updated version formerly used by the Japan Maritime Self-Defense Force (JMSDF).

== History ==
=== Italy ===
The Sparviero-class fast attack hydrofoil was designed in Italy by the Alinavi society, a consortium of the American company Boeing, the Italian government's naval research branch, and Carlo Rodriquez, a Messina-based builder of commercial hydrofoils, based on Boeing's Tucumcari for the United States Navy. A prototype, named Sparviero was ordered in 1970 for the Italian Navy, Sparviero was laid down by Alinavi in La Spezia in April 1971, was launched on 9 May 1973 and commissioned into Italian service on 15 July 1974.

The design used the Boeing Jetfoil system, with one hydrofoil forward and two aft, which folded out of the water when cruising. The boat was propelled at high speeds by a Rolls-Royce Proteus gas turbine driving a water jet, while a diesel engine driving a retractable propeller powered the boat at low speeds. The hull and superstructure were constructed entirely of aluminium. As the design was intended for short-range, high speed operations, no sleeping accommodation was fitted. Armament consisted of two Otomat anti-ship missiles aft and a single Oto Melara 76 mm (3.0 in) rapid-fire gun forward.

It was planned in 1974–1975 to order four more Sparviero-class hydrofoils, to be supplemented by at least two larger Pegasus-class hydrofoils, but plans for a NATO-wide standardisation on the Pegasus class were abandoned. When orders were finally placed in 1977, they were for six more Sparvieros (giving seven in total) and no Pegasus-class boats. The new boats, built by Fincantieri at Muggiano, entered service from 1982 to 1984, and differed from the prototype in having a more advanced installation for the Otomat missiles (using the Teseo control system) and having water injection fitted to the gas turbines.

The class proved to be underpowered, and it was hoped to re-engine them with more powerful (4,768 kW; 6,394 bhp) Alison gas turbines, but these plans were later abandoned. All of the Italian boats were decommissioned between 1991 and 1999. Only one of them remains, Grifone, which is preserved as a museum ship in Venice.

=== Japan ===
The Japan Maritime Self-Defense Force (JMSDF) selected a modified version of the Sparviero class as a replacement for its PT 11-class torpedo boats. A license agreement was signed in 1991 to build up to 12 Sparvieros, with the first two approved in FY90 and both were laid down by Sumitomo in Uraga on 25 March 1991. An order for a third boat was delayed to help pay for Japan's contribution to the Gulf War, with it not being laid down until 1993. A request for a fourth boat under the FY 95 budget was rejected, and plans for further hydrofoils abandoned.

The Japanese chose different armament than used in the Italian boats, with up to four Type 90 Ship-to-Ship Missiles replacing the Otomats and a non-stabilised 20 mm (0.79 in) M61 Vulcan rotary cannon replacing the larger Oto Melara gun. The main powerplant is a 3,900 kW (5,200 shp) General Electric LM500 gas turbine.

== Military use ==
Italian boats have all been decommissioned. The Sparviero class was used by the Japanese coastal patrol forces as a fast attack interceptor.

== Ships in class ==
=== Italy ===
(All decommissioned)

	Number	Laid down	Launched	Commissioned	Decommissioned	Notes
Sparviero	P 420	April 1971	9 May 1973	15 July 1974	30 September 1991	
Nibbio	P 421	1 August 1977	29 February 1980	7 March 1980	10 October 1996	
Falcone	P 422	1 October 1977	27 October 1980	7 March 1982	1990s	
Astore	P 423	1 July 1978	20 July 1981	5 February 1983	1990s	
Grifone	P 424	15 November 1978	1 December 1981	5 February 1983	1990s	Preserved in Venice
Gheppio	P 425	16 May 1979	24 June 1982	20 September 1983	1990s	Sold into private hands, assumed scrapped late 2000s
Condor	P 426	21 March 1980	25 January 1983	7 April 1984	1990s	

=== Japan ===
(All currently decommissioned, but some may have been reactivated in 2014)

	Number	Laid down	Launched	Commissioned	Decommissioned	Notes
PG 01	821	25 March 1991	17 July 1992	22 March 1993	6 June 2008	
PG 02	822	25 March 1991	17 July 1992	22 March 1993	6 June 2008	
PG 03	823	8 March 1993	15 June 1994	13 March 1995	24 June 2010	

== See also ==
- HMCS Bras d'Or (FHE 400), a Canadian hydrofoil intended for anti-submarine duties
- HMS Speedy (P296), a Royal Navy Jetfoil mine countermeasure vessel.
- Matka-class missile boat, a class of Soviet PHM
- Sarancha-class missile boat, a class of Soviet PHM
