= KD Laksamana Tan Pusmah =

Decommissioned Malaysian warship

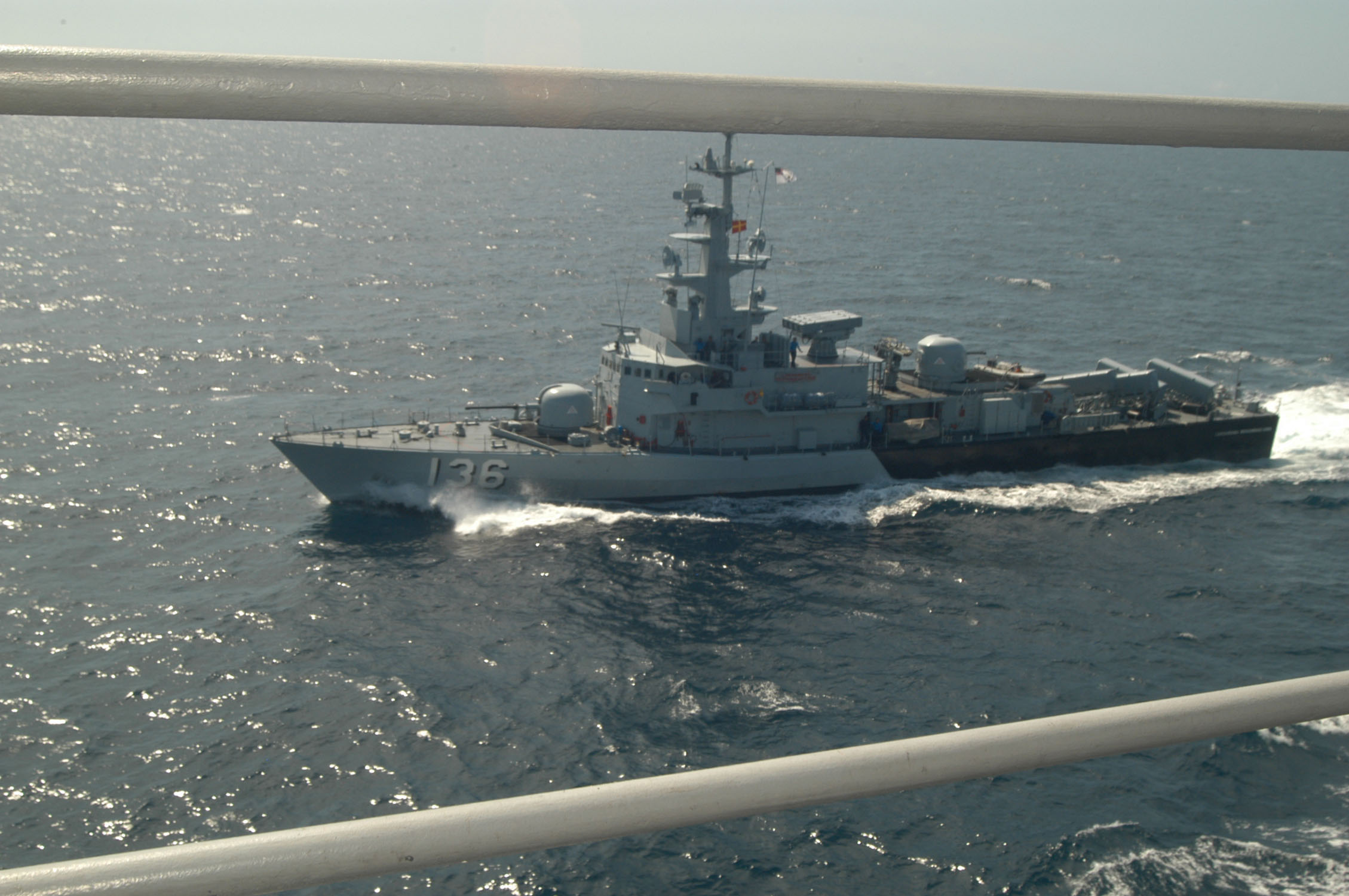
- Sister ship KD Laksamana Muhammad Amin

History

Iraq
- Name: Salah Ad Din Alayoobi
- Namesake: Saladin
- Ordered: February 1981
- Builder: Fincantieri, Marghera
- Laid down: 17 September 1982
- Launched: 30 March 1984
- Completed: 1988
- Identification: Pennant number: F220
- Fate: Never delivered to Iraq due to sanctions, later sold to Malaysia 1997

Malaysia
- Name: KD Laksamana Tan Pusmah
- Acquired: 20 February 1997
- Commissioned: 31 July 1999
- Decommissioned: 05 June 2025
- Identification: Pennant number: F137
- Status: Decommissioned
- Badge

General characteristics
- Class & type: Laksamana-class corvette
- Displacement: 675 long tons (686 t) full load
- Length: 62.3 m (204 ft 5 in)
- Beam: 9.3 m (30 ft 6 in)
- Draught: 2.8 m (9 ft 2 in)
- Propulsion: 4 MTU 20V 956 TB 92 diesels; 4 shafts developing; 20,400 bhp (15,200 kW)
- Speed: 36 knots (67 km/h)
- Range: 2,300 nautical miles (4,300 km) at 18 knots (33 km/h)
- Complement: 56
- Sensors & processing systems: RAN-12 air/surface search radar; RTN-10X fire control radar; Kelvin Hughes 1007 navigation radar; Diodon hull sonar
- Electronic warfare & decoys: Gamma suite; SCLAR chaff
- Armament: Guns: 1 × 76 mm Oto Melara; 1 × DARDO/40 mm Breda CIWS; Anti-air: 4 × Aspide SAM (removed); Anti-ship: 6 × Otomat Mk 2 SSM (removed); Anti-submarine: 2 × triple Eurotorp B515 with A244-S ASW torpedoes (removed)
- Notes: The missile might be removed due to being obsolete

KD Laksamana Tan Pusmah (F137) was the fourth Laksamana-class corvette in of the Royal Malaysian Navy. She was built by Italian company Fincantieri based on the Type 550 corvette design. She was officially decommissioned on 05 June 2025.

== Development ==
The Laksamana-class corvettes of the Royal Malaysian Navy are modified Assad-class corvettes built by Fincantieri, Italy. They were originally ordered by Iraqi Navy in February 1981. The corvettes were never delivered to Iraq and instead refitted and sold to Malaysia in mid 1990s.

== Service history ==
Laksamana Tan Pusmah were originally ordered by the Iraqi Navy as Salah Ad Din Alayoobi (F220). Her keel was laid down on 17 September 1982, launched on 30 March 1984 and she was completed in 1988. Upon her completion, Salah Ad Din Alayoobi was laid up at Muggiano due to trade embargo during Iran–Iraq War that prevented her from being delivered to Iraq. She was finally released for delivery in 1990, but as Iraq was again embargoed following its invasion of Kuwait, the ship was kept laid up by Fincantieri. It was proposed that she would be requisitioned by Italian Navy or sold to either Morocco or Colombia.

Royal Malaysian Navy signed a contract with Fincantieri for Salah Ad Din Alayoobi and her sister Abdullah Ibn Abi Serh on 20 February 1997. She and her sister were refitted at Muggiano and later arrived in Malaysia in September 1999. The ship was commissioned as KD Laksamana Tan Pusmah on 31 July 1999. She and her sister ships will be going for a refit to extend their service life and improving their combat capabilities.
