= KD Laksamana Muhammad Amin =

Corvette in the Royal Malaysian Navy

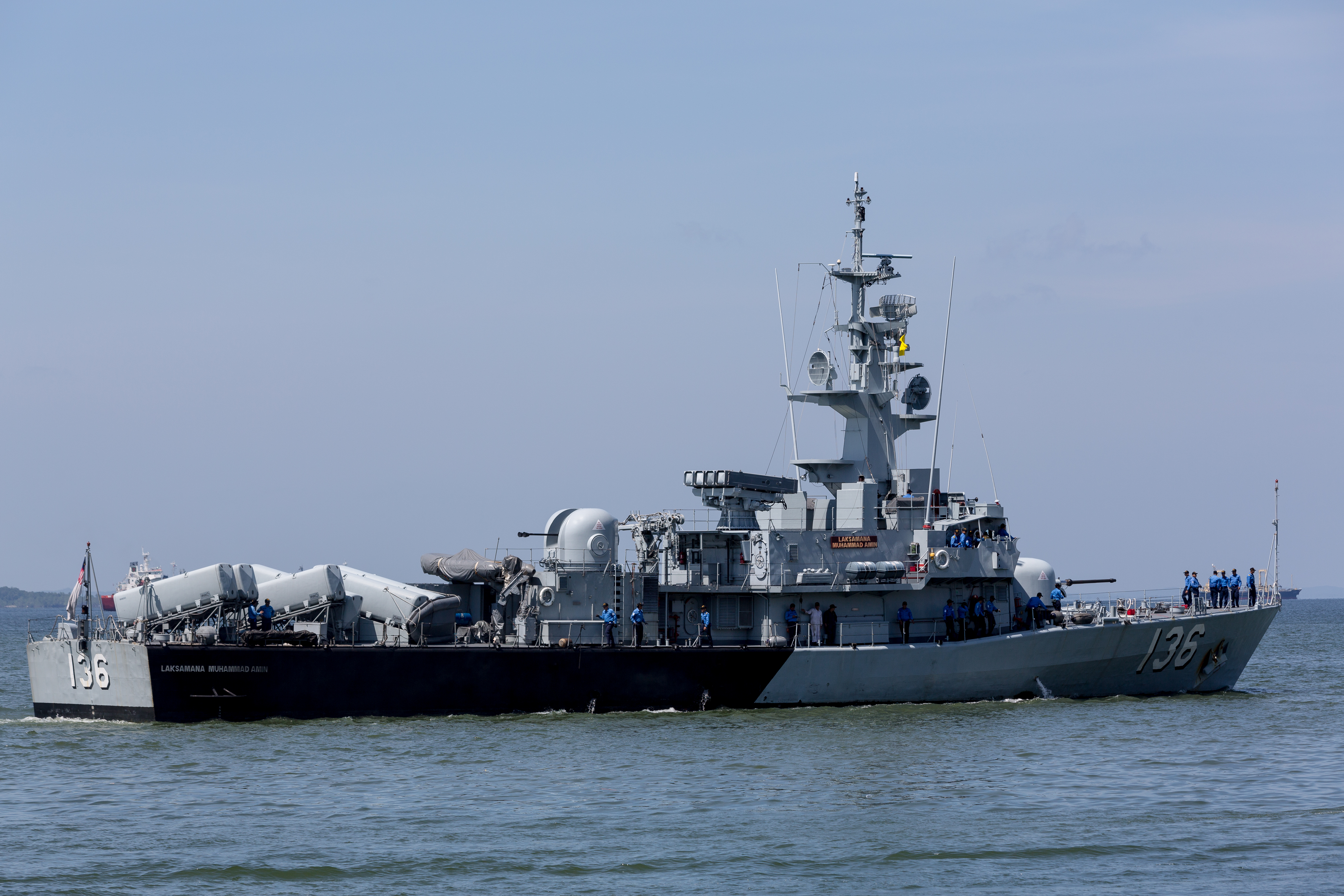
- KD Laksamana Muhammad Amin (F136)

History

Iraq
- Name: Abdullah Ibn Abi Serh
- Namesake: Abdallah ibn Sa'd
- Ordered: February 1981
- Builder: Fincantieri, Mestre
- Laid down: 22 March 1982
- Launched: 5 July 1983
- Completed: 1987
- Identification: Pennant number: F214
- Fate: Never delivered to Iraq due to sanctions, later sold to Malaysia 1997

Malaysia
- Name: KD Laksamana Muhammad Amin
- Namesake: Laksamana Mohamad Amin
- Acquired: 20 February 1997
- Commissioned: 31 July 1999
- Identification: Pennant number: F136
- Status: In active service
- Badge

General characteristics
- Class & type: Laksamana-class corvette
- Displacement: 675 long tons (686 t) full load
- Length: 62.3 m (204 ft 5 in)
- Beam: 9.3 m (30 ft 6 in)
- Draught: 2.8 m (9 ft 2 in)
- Propulsion: 4 MTU 20V 956 TB 92 diesels; 4 shafts developing; 20,400 bhp (15,200 kW)
- Speed: 36 knots (67 km/h)
- Range: 2,300 nautical miles (4,300 km) at 18 knots (33 km/h)
- Complement: 56
- Sensors & processing systems: RAN-12 air/surface search radar; RTN-10X fire control radar; Kelvin Hughes 1007 navigation radar; Diodon hull sonar
- Electronic warfare & decoys: Gamma suite; SCLAR chaff
- Armament: Guns: 1 × 76 mm Oto Melara; 1 × DARDO/40 mm Breda CIWS; Anti-air: 4 × Aspide SAM (removed); Anti-ship: 6 × Otomat Mk 2 SSM (removed); Anti-submarine: 2 × triple Eurotorp B515 with A244-S ASW torpedoes (removed)
- Notes: The missile might be removed due to being obsolete

KD Laksamana Muhammad Amin (F136) is the third ship of Laksamana-class corvette currently in service with the Royal Malaysian Navy. She built by Fincantieri based on the Type 550 corvette design and currently serving in the 24th Corvette Squadron of the Royal Malaysian Navy.

== Development ==
The Laksamana-class corvettes of the Royal Malaysian Navy are modified Assad-class corvettes built by Fincantieri, Italy. They were originally ordered by Iraqi Navy in February 1981. The corvettes were never delivered to Iraq and instead refitted and sold to Malaysia in mid 1990s.

== Service history ==
Laksamana Muhammad Amin were originally ordered by the Iraqi Navy as Abdullah Ibn Abi Serh (F214). Her keel was laid down on 22 March 1982, launched on 5 July 1983 and she was completed in 1987. Upon her completion, Abdullah Ibn Abi Serh was laid up at Muggiano due to trade embargo during Iran–Iraq War that prevented her from being delivered to Iraq. She was finally released for delivery in 1990, but as Iraq was again embargoed following its invasion of Kuwait, the ship was kept laid up by Fincantieri. It was proposed that she would be requisitioned by Italian Navy or sold to either Morocco or Colombia.

Royal Malaysian Navy signed a contract with Fincantieri for Abdullah Ibn Abi Serh and her sister Salah Ad Din Alayoobi on 20 February 1997. She and her sister were refitted at Muggiano and later arrived in Malaysia in September 1999. The ship was commissioned as KD Laksamana Muhammad Amin on 31 July 1999. Due to their age, she together with the other sister ships will be upgraded and refitted to extend their service life.
