= KD Laksamana Tun Abdul Jamil =

Malaysian naval corvette (1997–2025)

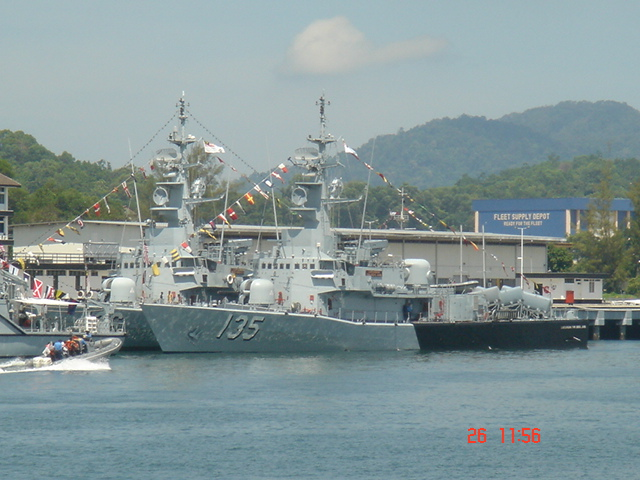
- KD Laksamana Tun Abdul Jamil (F135)

History

Iraq
- Name: Saad Ibn Abi Wakkas
- Namesake: Sa'd ibn Abi Waqqas
- Ordered: February 1981
- Builder: Fincantieri, Marghera
- Laid down: 17 September 1982
- Launched: 30 December 1983
- Completed: 1988
- Identification: Pennant number: F218
- Fate: Never delivered to Iraq due to sanctions, later sold to Malaysia 1995

Malaysia
- Name: KD Laksamana Tun Abdul Jamil
- Namesake: Tun Abdul Jamil
- Acquired: 26 October 1995
- Commissioned: 28 July 1997
- Decommissioned: 05 June 2025
- Identification: Pennant number: F135
- Status: Decommissioned
- Badge

General characteristics
- Class & type: Laksamana-class corvette
- Displacement: 675 long tons (686 t) full load
- Length: 62.3 m (204 ft 5 in)
- Beam: 9.3 m (30 ft 6 in)
- Draught: 2.8 m (9 ft 2 in)
- Propulsion: 4 MTU 20V 956 TB 92 diesels; 4 shafts developing; 20,400 bhp (15,200 kW)
- Speed: 36 knots (67 km/h)
- Range: 2,300 nautical miles (4,300 km) at 18 knots (33 km/h)
- Complement: 56
- Sensors & processing systems: RAN-12 air/surface search radar; RTN-10X fire control radar; Kelvin Hughes 1007 navigation radar; Diodon hull sonar
- Electronic warfare & decoys: Gamma suite; SCLAR chaff
- Armament: Guns: 1 × 76 mm Oto Melara; 1 × DARDO/40 mm Breda CIWS; Anti-air: 4 × Aspide SAM (removed); Anti-ship: 6 × Otomat Mk 2 SSM (removed); Anti-submarine: 2 × triple Eurotorp B515 with A244-S ASW torpedoes (removed)
- Notes: The missile might be removed due to being obsolete

KD Laksamana Tun Abdul Jamil (F135) was the ship of Laksamana-class corvette in Royal Malaysian Navy. She was built by Fincantieri based on the Type 550 corvette design. Laksamana Tun Abdul Jamil was a part of the Royal Malaysian Navy's 24th Corvette Squadron. She was decommissioned on 05 June 2025.

== Development ==
The Laksamana-class corvettes of the Royal Malaysian Navy are modified Assad-class corvettes built by Fincantieri, Italy. They were originally ordered by Iraqi Navy in February 1981. The corvettes were never delivered to Iraq and instead refitted and sold to Malaysia in mid 1990s.

== Service history ==
Laksamana Tun Abdul Jamil were originally ordered by the Iraqi Navy as Saad Ibn Abi Wakkas (F218). Her keel was laid down on 17 September 1982, launched on 30 December 1983 and she was completed in 1988. Upon her completion, Saad Ibn Abi Wakkas was laid up at Muggiano due to trade embargo during Iran–Iraq War that prevented her from being delivered to Iraq. She was finally released for delivery in 1990, but as Iraq was again embargoed following its invasion of Kuwait, the ship was kept laid up by Fincantieri. It was proposed that she would be requisitioned by Italian Navy or sold to either Morocco or Colombia.

Royal Malaysian Navy signed a contract with Fincantieri for Saad Ibn Abi Wakkas and her sister Khalid Ibn Al Walid on 26 October 1995. She and her sister were refitted at Muggiano and later arrived in Malaysia in September 1997. The ship was commissioned as KD Laksamana Tun Abdul Jamil on 28 July 1997. RMN confirmed that she and other sister ships will be upgrade to extend their service life.
