= KD Laksamana Hang Nadim =

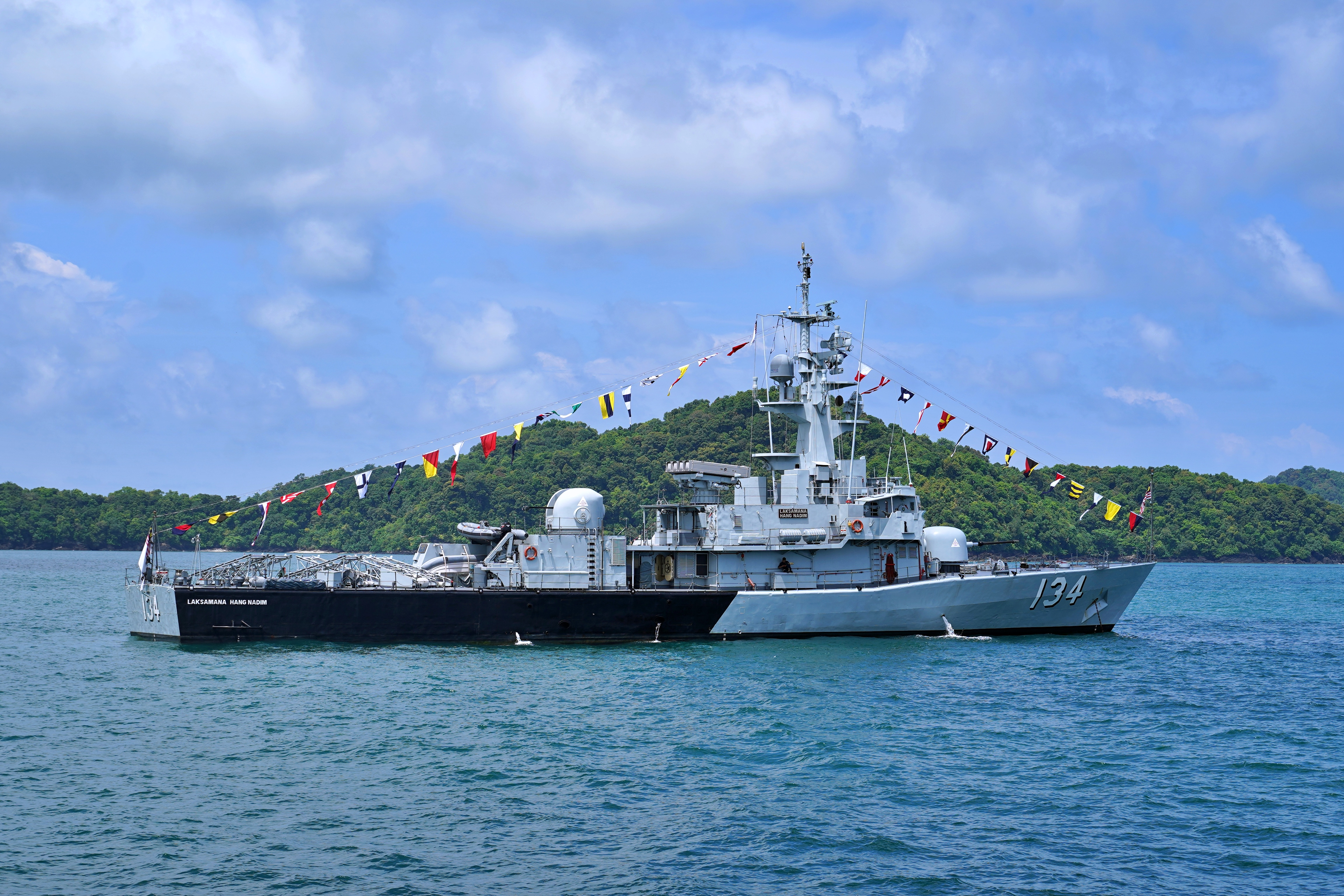
- KD Laksamana Hang Nadim (F134)

History

Iraq
- Name: Khalid Ibn Al Walid
- Namesake: Khalid ibn al-Walid
- Ordered: February 1981
- Builder: Fincantieri, Mestre
- Laid down: 3 June 1982
- Launched: 5 July 1983
- Completed: 1987
- Identification: Pennant number: F216
- Fate: Never delivered to Iraq due to sanctions, later sold to Malaysia 1995

Malaysia
- Name: KD Laksamana Hang Nadim
- Namesake: Hang Nadim
- Acquired: 26 October 1995
- Commissioned: 28 July 1997
- Identification: Pennant number: F134
- Status: In active service
- Badge

General characteristics
- Class & type: Laksamana-class corvette
- Displacement: 675 long tons (686 t) full load
- Length: 62.3 m (204 ft 5 in)
- Beam: 9.3 m (30 ft 6 in)
- Draught: 2.8 m (9 ft 2 in)
- Propulsion: 4 MTU 20V 956 TB 92 diesels; 4 shafts developing; 20,400 bhp (15,200 kW)
- Speed: 36 knots (67 km/h)
- Range: 2,300 nautical miles (4,300 km) at 18 knots (33 km/h)
- Complement: 56
- Sensors & processing systems: RAN-12 air/surface search radar; RTN-10X fire control radar; Kelvin Hughes 1007 navigation radar; Diodon hull sonar
- Electronic warfare & decoys: Gamma suite; SCLAR chaff
- Armament: Guns: 1 × 76 mm Oto Melara; 1 × DARDO/40 mm Breda CIWS; Anti-air: 4 × Aspide SAM (removed); Anti-ship: 6 × Otomat Mk 2 SSM (removed); Anti-submarine: 2 × triple Eurotorp B515 with A244-S ASW torpedoes (removed)
- Notes: The missile might be removed due to being obsolete

KD Laksamana Hang Nadim (F134) is the lead ship of Laksamana-class corvette currently in service with the Royal Malaysian Navy. She is currently serving in the 24th Corvette Squadron of the Royal Malaysian Navy. She is based on the Fincantieri Type 550 corvette design.

== Development ==
The Laksamana-class corvettes of the Royal Malaysian Navy are modified Assad-class corvettes built by Fincantieri, Italy. They were originally ordered by Iraqi Navy in February 1981. The corvettes were never delivered to Iraq and instead refitted and sold to Malaysia in mid 1990s.

== Service history ==
Laksamana Hang Nadim were originally ordered by the Iraqi Navy as Khalid Ibn Al Walid (F216). Her keel was laid down on 3 June 1982, launched on 5 July 1983 and she was completed in 1987. Upon her completion, Khalid Ibn Al Walid was laid up at Muggiano due to trade embargo during Iran–Iraq War that prevented her from being delivered to Iraq. She was finally released for delivery in 1990, but as Iraq was again embargoed following its invasion of Kuwait, the ship was kept laid up by Fincantieri. It was proposed that she would be requisitioned by Italian Navy or sold to either Morocco or Colombia.

Royal Malaysian Navy signed a contract with Fincantieri for Khalid Ibn Al Walid and her sister Saad Ibn Abi Wakkas on 26 October 1995. She and her sister were refitted at Muggiano and later arrived in Malaysia in September 1997. The ship was commissioned as KD Laksamana Hang Nadim on 28 July 1997. After serving for a long time in Royal Malaysian Navy, it was confirmed that she and other sister ships will be upgraded to extend their service life.
