= Assad-class corvette =

Iraqi naval vessel

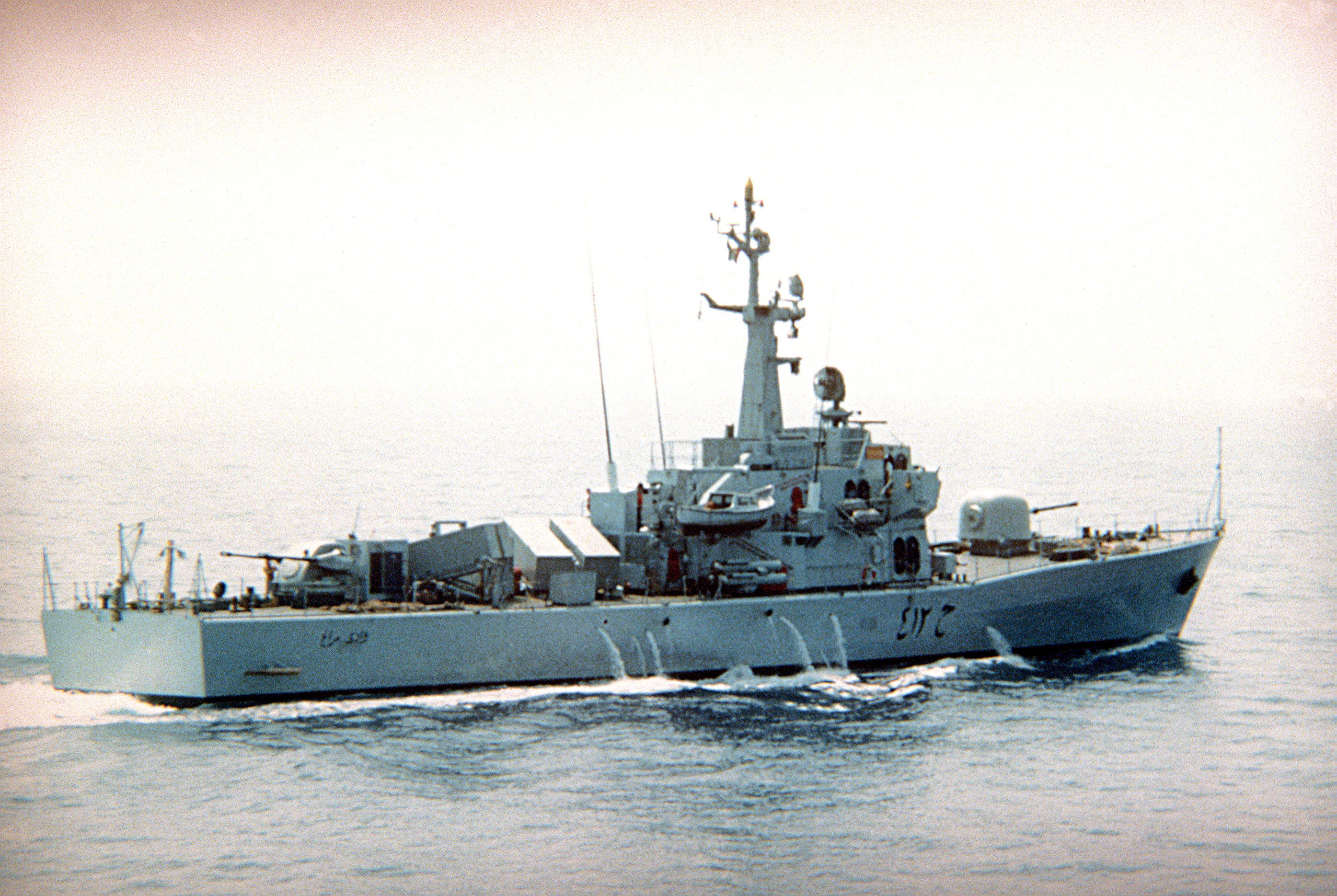
- Al Tadjier underway in 1983

Class overview
- Name: Assad class
- Operators: Iraqi Navy; Libyan Navy; Royal Malaysian Navy
- Subclasses: Laksamana class
- Built: 1981-1988
- In commission: 1995-present
- Planned: 10
- Completed: 10
- Active: 2
- Laid up: 1
- Lost: 2
- Retired: 5

General characteristics
- Type: Corvette
- Displacement: 600 tons standard; 675 tons full load
- Length: 62.3 m (204 ft)
- Beam: 9.3 m (31 ft)
- Draft: 2.8 m (9.2 ft)
- Propulsion: 4 shaft MTU 16V 956 TB91 diesel engines, 24,400 hp (18,200 kW)
- Speed: 37.5 knots (69.5 km/h)
- Range: 4,000 nmi (4,600 mi) at 18 knots (33 km/h)
- Complement: 51
- Armament: 1- Otobreda 76 mm; 2 - 40 mm Breda Dardo guns; 2 - 35mm Oerlikon cannon (Libya) in a single powered twin turret; 1 Surface-to-air-missile - Albatros Selenia Aspide (1 × 4); 6 Otomat anti-ship missiles; 6 - ASW torpedo tubes

The Assad-class corvette were originally built for Iraq during the Iran–Iraq War, by Fincantieri in Italy. Six ships were ordered in 1981. They were completed just before Operation Desert Storm, and were never delivered due to embargoes by the Italian government. (Note: According to Christopher Chant ("Small Craft Navies", ISBN 1-85409-046-1) all six ships of this class were commissioned already 1988. (September 2018))

Four of the six ships were sold to the Malaysian Navy as Laksamana-class corvettes in 1995. The two remaining ships were laid up in La Spezia from 1990, but in 2005 it was announced they would be delivered to the New Iraqi Navy. The deal, however was later cancelled due to the condition of the ships upon inspection. On 19 May 2017, it was reported that the remaining two vessels would be delivered to the Iraq Navy after 26 years. They eventually left La Spezia on a semi-submersible carrier Eide Trader on 22 May and reached Iraq in June 2017.

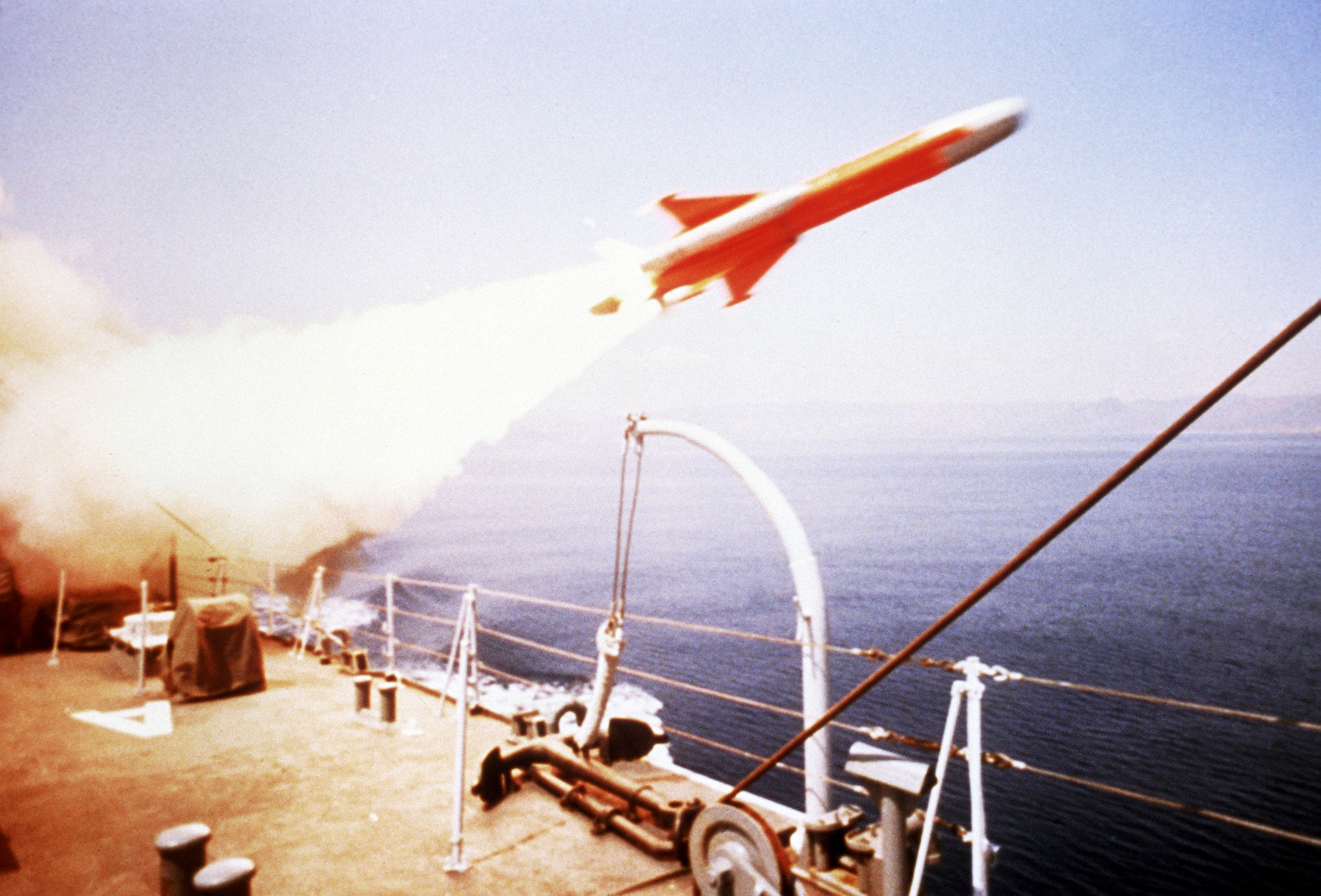
Otomat missile launch from an Al Assad class ship

The Libyan Navy operated four craft but their fate is unknown. Al Tadjier is believed to have been destroyed by US Navy aircraft. The other ships that served with the Libyan navy were Al Tougour, Al Kalij and Al Hudud. All the ships entered service between 1977 and 1979. All the remaining ships were scrapped in 1993.

== Ships of the class ==
Pennant number	Name	Builder	Launched	Commissioned	Status	Notes
Iraqi Navy – Assad class ( 6 vessels )
F210	Musa ibn Nusayr	Fincantieri	5 July 1983	June 2017	Sunk	Laid up in La Spezia after completion due to arms embargo imposed after the Gulf War in 1991 on Iraq. Delivered on 22 May 2017, 26 years after ordered. Sunk in Iraq Naval base in port of Umm Qasr in 2023.
F212	Tariq ibn Ziyad	Fincantieri	5 July 1983	June 2017	Laid Up	Laid up in La Spezia after completion due to arms embargo imposed after the Gulf War in 1991 on Iraq. Delivered on 22 May 2017, 26 years after ordered. Laid up in Umm Qasr Port.
F214	Abdullah ibn Abi Serh	Fincantieri	5 July 1983	NA	NA	Never delivered due to arms embargo imposed after the Gulf War in 1991. Purchased by Royal Malaysian Navy.
F216	Khalid ibn al Walid	Fincantieri	5 July 1983	NA	NA	Never delivered due to arms embargo imposed after the Gulf War in 1991. Purchased by Royal Malaysian Navy.
F218	Saad ibn abi Wakkad	Fincantieri	30 December 1983	NA	NA	Never delivered due to arms embargo imposed after the Gulf War in 1991. Purchased by Royal Malaysian Navy.
F220	Salah Aldin Ayoobi	Fincantieri	30 March 1984	NA	NA	Never delivered due to arms embargo imposed after the Gulf War in 1991. Purchased by Royal Malaysian Navy.
Libyan Navy – Assad class ( 4 vessels )
	Al Tadjier	Fincantieri		1977	Destroyed	Sunk by US Navy aircraft.
	Al Tougour	Fincantieri		1977	Scrapped	Scrapped in 1993.
	Al Kalij	Fincantieri		1979	Scrapped	Scrapped in 1993.
	Al Hudud	Fincantieri		1979	Scrapped	Scrapped in 1993.
Royal Malaysian Navy – Laksamana class ( 4 vessels )
F134	Laksamana Hang Nadim	Fincantieri	5 July 1983	28 July 1997	Active	Launched as Khalid ibn al Walid (F216) intended for Iraqi Navy but were never delivered due to arms embargo imposed after the Gulf War in 1991.
F135	Laksamana Tun Abdul Jamil	Fincantieri	30 December 1983	28 July 1997	Decommissioned	Launched as Saad ibn abi Wakkad (F218) intended for Iraqi Navy but were never delivered due to arms embargo imposed after the Gulf War in 1991. Decommissioned in 2025.
F136	Laksamana Muhammad Amin	Fincantieri	5 July 1983	July 1999	Active	Launched as Abdullah ibn Abi Serh (F214) intended for Iraqi Navy but were never delivered due to arms embargo imposed after the Gulf War in 1991.
F137	Laksamana Tan Pusmah	Fincantieri	30 March 1984	July 1999	Decommissioned	Launched as Salah Aldin Ayoobi (F220) intended for Iraqi Navy but were never delivered due to arms embargo imposed after the Gulf War in 1991. Decommissioned in 2025.
