= Al Basra-class offshore support vessel =

Vessel class of the U.S. and Iraqi navies

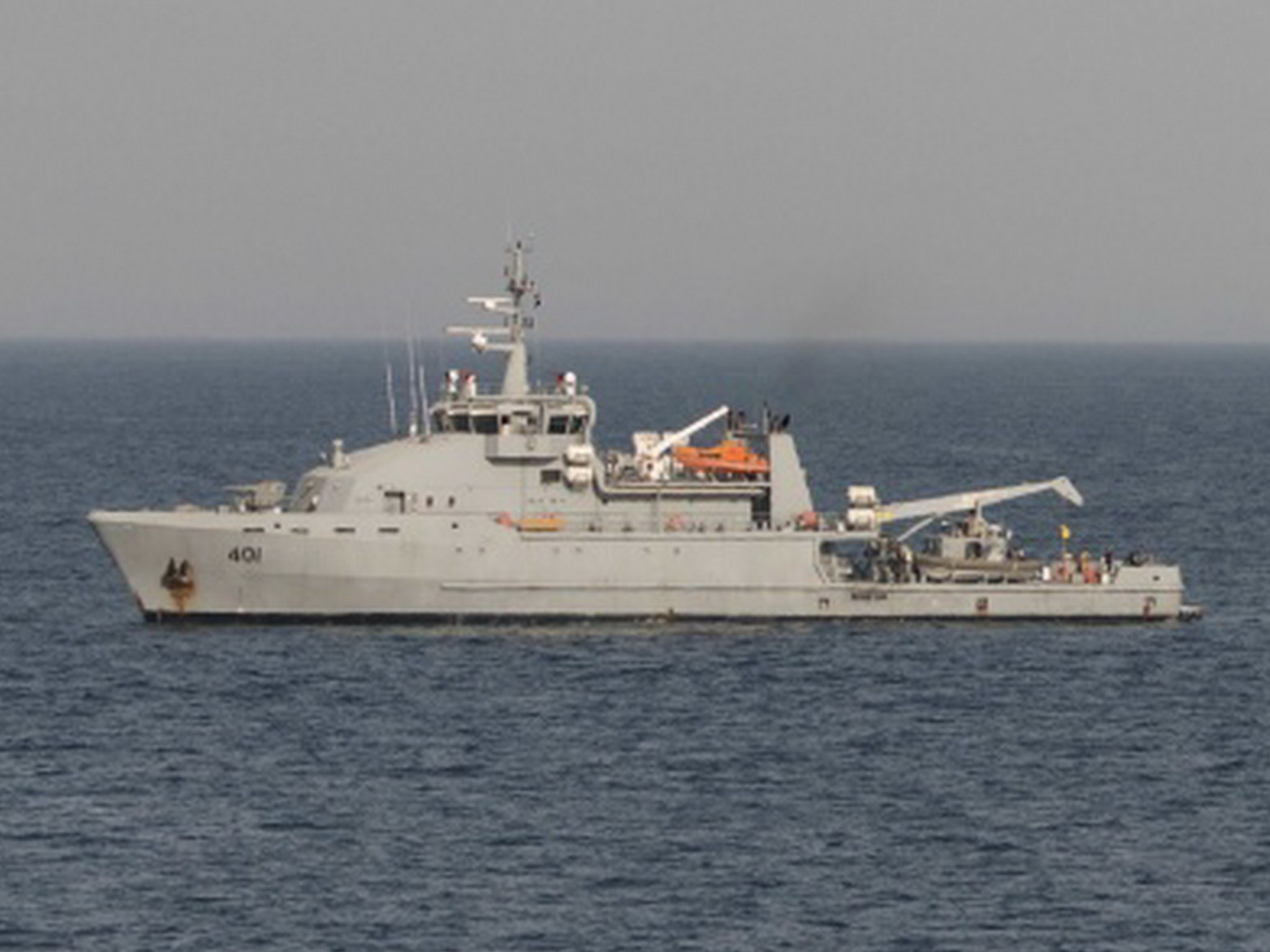
- OSV 401 “Al Basra”

Class overview
- Name: Al Basra class
- Builders: RiverHawk Fast Sea Frames (RHFSF)
- Operators: US Navy; Iraqi Navy
- Cost: 70M$ for 2 units
- Completed: OSV 1(USN) or OSV 401 “Al Basra”; OSV 2(USN) or OSV 402 “Al Fayhaa”

General characteristics
- Type: Offshore Support Vessel; Offshore Patrol Vessel; Troop Transport
- Length: 60.00 m (196.85 ft)
- Beam: 11.20 m (36.7 ft)
- Draught: 3.90 m (12.8 ft)
- Propulsion: 2 Caterpillar 3516C engines; 3150 BHP @ 1800 rpm
- Capacity: 2 × Fast Attack Boats (FABs); Accommodation for 14 fast attack boat (FAB) crew members and six divers, and seating for 40 troops
- Complement: 26 crew members
- Armament: 30 mm MSI Seahawk; 4 × 50-caliber M2 heavy machine guns; 6 × M240 7.62mm light machine guns
- Aviation facilities: Vertical replenishment/Helicopter deck

The Al Basra-class offshore support vessel (manufacturer designates as RiverHawk OSV 60) is a 60-meter (200 ft) multi-function offshore support vessel, providing a wide range of capabilities from command and control, to support and protection of oil/Gas installations, to acting as a "mothership" for patrol boats. Vessels of the class are operated by the United States Navy and the Iraqi Navy.

== Designer and naval architects ==
International Maritime Consultants (IMC) was responsible for the functional design of the Iraqi Navy Al Basra class 60 metre OSV. The original design draws heavily from the offshore support vessel sector, since the boats were designed to conduct both maritime security operations and offshore service tasks.

IMC is an independent naval architecture consultancy based in Fremantle, Western Australia, providing a comprehensive range of naval architecture, marine engineering and project management services to the global marine, maritime and offshore industries.

== Features and capabilities ==
=== Troops transport ===
Al Basra class ships can accommodate dozens of troops including Marine Commandos, SCUBA divers or transport support for crew changes and resupply to the platforms. The well deck accommodate two Fast attack boats and gives the vessel the capability to intercept suspicious vessels, search and rescue and landing troops on shore.

=== Support ===
The Al Basra class is constructed and fitted to accomplish a variety of jobs. The vessel is equipped with a firefighting capability and fire monitors for fighting external fires at sea. Also, the vessel is equipped with oil containment and recovery equipment to assist in the cleanup of a spill at sea. In addition the vessel has a towage capacity of 3150 BHP.

=== Patrol vessel ===
The Al Basra class is a blue water vessel operational and maneuverable in very difficult weather conditions, the vessel can accomplish all the mission of an offshore patrol vessel. The vessel has the capacity to acting as a "mothership" for small patrol boats and has the mission to provide logistic support from repairs, to crew provisions, to refueling.

=== Armament ===
Ships of the Al Basra are supplied with one 30 mm MSI Seahawk for air defense and naval gunfire. They are also equipped with four 12.7 mm M2-HB Browing machine guns and six M240 light machine guns.
