= Al-Uboor-class patrol boat =

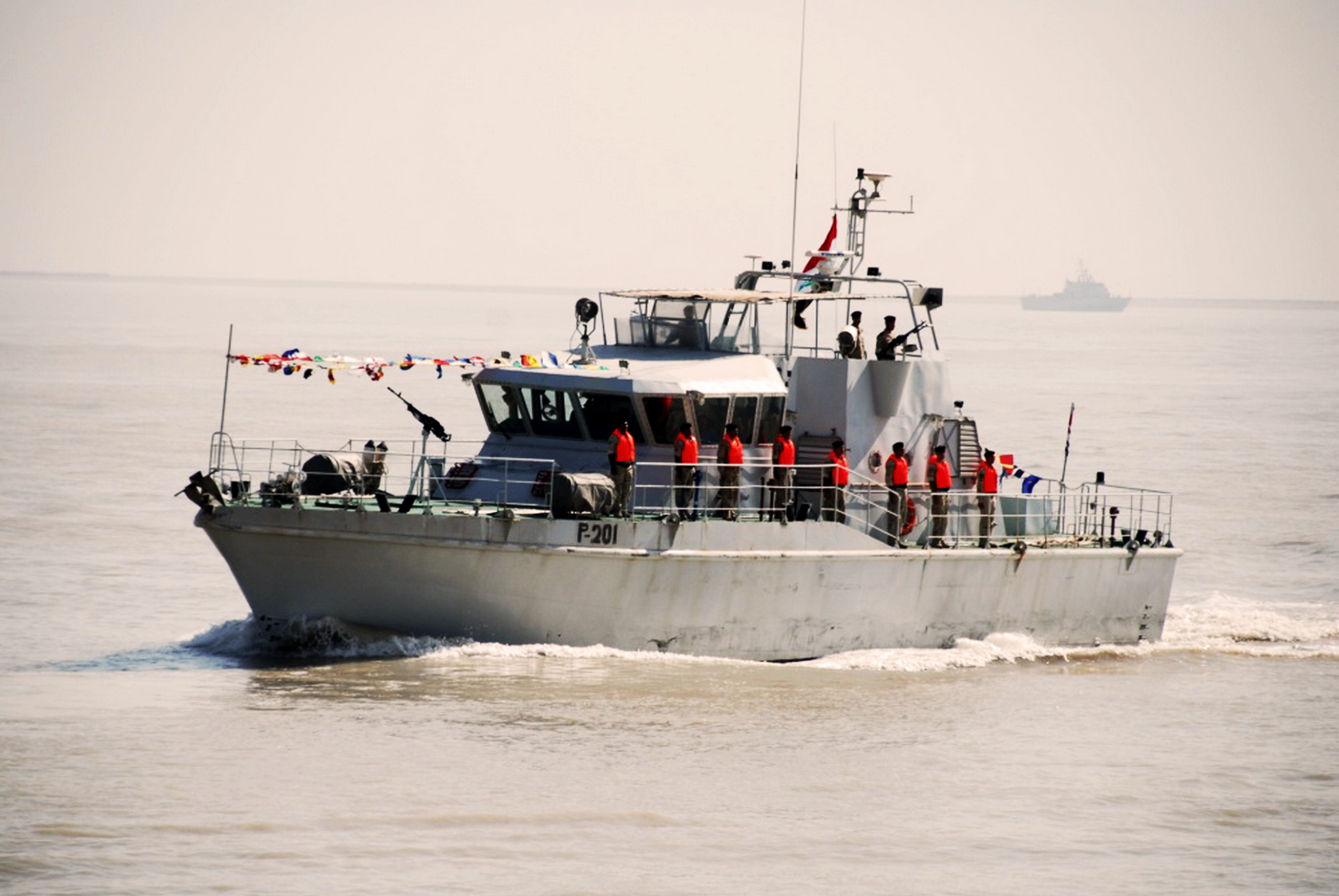

Class overview
- Name: Al-Uboor class
- Operators: Iraqi Navy
- Built: 2005
- Planned: 6

General characteristics
- Type: Patrol boat

The Al-Uboor class is a class of patrol boats of the Iraqi Navy.

== Acquisition ==
On 17 February 2005 a contract was signed for six new Iraqi Navy ships to be built in Iraq and in support of the local Baghdad economy. The first of the ships, called the Al Uboor-class patrol boats, was to enter service in six months with the last of them hitting the water 18 months from the signing. Construction had begun before Operation Iraqi Freedom, but the new contract saw the ships completed to a revised design. Funded by the Interim Iraqi Government's 2005 defense budget, they cost approximately $15 million. The ships will patrol Iraqi territorial waters. Completing the contracts and continuing the construction of the ships is the first example of joint planning by the Iraqi Ministry of Defense Policy and Requirements office and military staffs. It will also enable the coalition maritime presence in the Northern Persian Gulf to be reduced making a number of naval units available for other tasking, Iraqi officials said.
