= Laksamana-class corvette =

Class of small missile corvettes in the Royal Malaysian Navy

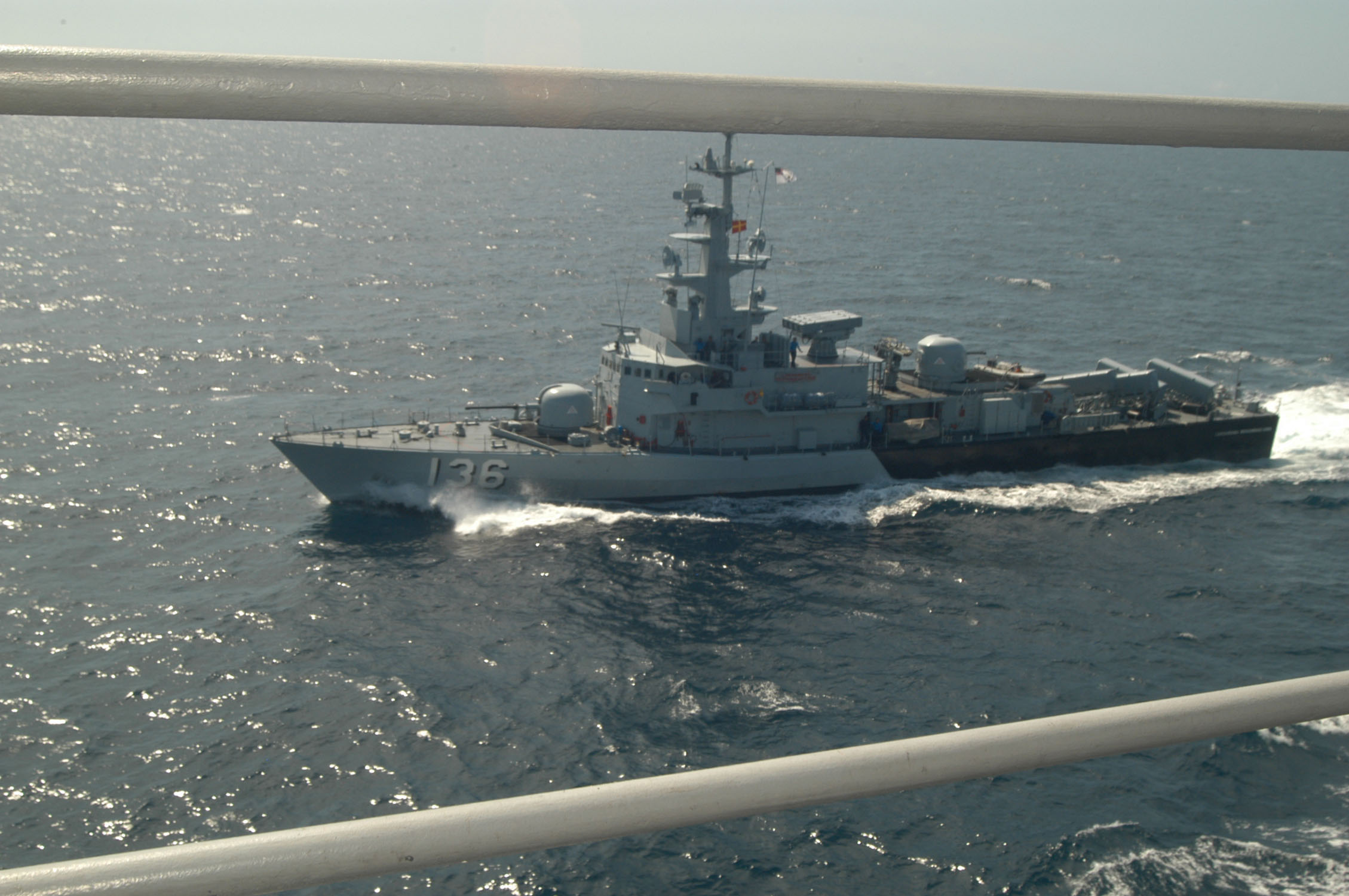
- KD Laksamana Muhammad Amin (F136) during Cooperation Afloat Readiness and Training (CARAT) exercises

Class overview
- Name: Laksamana class
- Builders: Fincantieri; Marghera shipyard
- Operators: Royal Malaysian Navy
- Succeeded by: Kasturi class
- Subclasses: Assad class
- Built: 1982-1988
- In commission: 1997-present
- Completed: 4
- Active: 2
- Retired: 2

General characteristics
- Type: Corvette
- Displacement: 675 tons full load
- Length: 62.3 m (204 ft 5 in)
- Beam: 9.3 m (30 ft 6 in)
- Draught: 2.8 m (9 ft 2 in)
- Propulsion: 4 MTU 20V 956 TB 92 diesels; 4 shafts developing; 20,400 bhp (15,200 kW)
- Speed: 36 knots (67 km/h)
- Range: 2,300 nautical miles (4,300 km) at 18 knots (33 km/h)
- Complement: 56
- Sensors & processing systems: RAN-12 air/surface search radar; RTN-10X fire control radar; Kelvin Hughes 1007 navigation radar; Diodon hull sonar
- Electronic warfare & decoys: Gamma suite; SCLAR chaff
- Armament: Guns: 1 × 76 mm Oto Melara; 1 × DARDO/40 mm Breda CIWS; Anti-air: 4 × Aspide SAM (removed); Anti-ship: 6 × Otomat Mk 2 SSM (removed); Anti-submarine: 2 × triple Eurotorp B515 with A244-S ASW torpedoes (removed)
- Notes: The missile might be removed due to being obsolete

The Laksamana class is a class of small missile corvettes comprising four ships currently in service with the Royal Malaysian Navy. Two out of four ships of the Laksamana class are currently serving in the 24th Corvette Squadron of the Royal Malaysian Navy, while the remaining two were decommissioned on 5 June 2025, with plans to preserve one of the decommissioned ships as a monument in Dataran Pahlawan, Putrajaya still underway.

== Development ==
The Laksamana-class corvettes were originally purchased by the Iraqi Navy as the Assad-class corvettes, their delivery was delayed and later cancelled because of international sanctions against Iraq following the invasion of Kuwait by Iraq. It is based on the Fincantieri Type 550 corvette design.

In October 1995, the Malaysian Ministry of Finance signed a contract with Italian company Fincantieri for the supply of two 675-ton missile corvettes for the Royal Malaysian Navy. Two more missile corvettes were ordered in February 1997. Some specific aspects of the ships' design were modified and the ships were refitted to meet the requirements of the Royal Malaysian Navy.

The first two ships, named KD Laksamana Hang Nadim and KD Laksamana Tun Abdul Jamil, were commissioned in July 1997. The second two, named KD Laksamana Muhammad Amin and KD Laksamana Tan Pusmah, were delivered in July 1999.

The ships are all named after famous Malay warriors who have earned the title Laksamana during their lifetimes. ("Laksamana" would translate as an admiral in modern usage, but in the Malay Sultanates, the title would be more a minister of the realm (a warrior) who is responsible for defense of the realm. The Laksamana is the second most senior position the Malay court, lower only than the Bendahara).

== Characteristics ==
=== Sensors ===
The ship's radar suite consists of a RAN 12L/X air and surface search radar, operating in D and I bands and a Kelvin Hughes 1007 navigation radar operating at I band. The ship is also fitted with a Global Positioning System (GPS).

The ship's electronic warfare suite comprises the INS-3 radar interceptor and the TQN-2 radar jammer.

Underwater sensors provided is the ASO 94-41 hull mounted active search and attack sonar supplied by Atlas Elektronik.

=== Armament ===
The Laksamana class is armed with the MBDA Otomat Mark 2/Teseo long-range sea-skimming missile with six missile launchers installed on the stern deck, three pointing to port and three pointing starboard. The missiles are armed with a 210 kg (460 lb) high-explosive warhead, fitted with impact and proximity fuses. The speed of the missile is Mach 0.9 and the range is 120 km (75 mi).

A medium-range air defence is provided with the semi-active radar homing MBDA Albatros SAM system, providing defence against aircraft and incoming anti-ship missiles. The Albatros system fires the Mach 2.5 Aspide missile over a 15 km (9.3 mi) range to deliver a 33 kg (73 lb) warhead.

The Laksamanas are also armed with two triple Whitehead Alenia ILAS-3 torpedo launchers installed one each side on the main deck, firing the A244/S anti-submarine torpedoes that use the active, passive and mixed mode homing to a target range of 7 km (4.3 mi).

The class is armed with a 76 mm (3 in) 62 calibre Oto Melara Super Rapid gun is installed on the bow deck in front of the citadel. The firing rate is 120 rounds per minute and range is up to 16 km (9.9 mi). The ships are also armed with the 40 mm (1.6 in) Oto Melara L70 twin gun in the multi-role mode over a range of 12.5 km (7.8 mi) and firing rate of 300 rounds/minute.

A 105 mm (4 in) decoy launcher is installed on both the port and starboard side of the ship. Each launcher has six launch tubes and is capable of firing illuminating rounds or chaff rounds to counter hostile radars and radar guided missiles.

=== Propulsion system ===
The ships are powered by four MTU 20V 956 TB 92 diesel engines developing 14.8 MW (19,800 hp) sustained power driving four shafts. Three diesel generators each yield 280 KVA. The engines provide a dash speed of 36 knots (67 km/h), a maximum sustained speed of 34 knots (63 km/h) and an economical speed of 18 knots (33 km/h). The range at 18 knots (33 km/h) is 2,300 nautical miles (4,300 km).

== Upgrade and refurbished ==
The Royal Malaysian Navy has confirmed that all four ships will be upgrade or refurbished to extend their service. The upgrade includes missile launchers, sensors, combat management system, fire control radar, IFF and chaff. As of 2022, the upgraded and refurbished program done for the first ship KD Laksamana Muhammad Amin. The upgrade however doesn't includes the installation of new weapons to replace the obsoleted missiles and torpedoes.

== Similar class ==
The four Assad-class corvettes built for Libya are a similar design to the Laksamana-class corvettes.

== Ships of the class ==
Pennant	Name	Builders	Launched	Commissioned	Status	Notes
F134	Laksamana Hang Nadim	Fincantieri, Marghera Shipyard	5 July 1983	28 July 1997	In service with the 24th Corvette Squadron	Launched as Khalid ibn al Walid (F216) intended for Iraqi Navy but were never delivered due to arms embargo imposed after the Gulf War in 1991
F135	Laksamana Tun Abdul Jamil	Fincantieri, Marghera Shipyard	30 December 1983	28 July 1997	Decommissioned 5 June 2025	Launched as Saad ibn abi Wakkas (F218) intended for Iraqi Navy but were never delivered due to arms embargo imposed after the Gulf War in 1991.
F136	Laksamana Muhammad Amin	Fincantieri, Marghera Shipyard	5 July 1983	July 1999	In service with the 24th Corvette Squadron	Launched as Abdullah ibn Abi Serh (F214) intended for Iraqi Navy but were never delivered due to arms embargo imposed after the Gulf War in 1991
F137	Laksamana Tan Pusmah	Fincantieri, Marghera Shipyard	30 March 1984	July 1999	Decommissioned 5 June 2025	Launched as Salah Aldin Ayoobi (F220) intended for Iraqi Navy but were never delivered due to arms embargo imposed after the Gulf War in 1991.

== Gallery ==
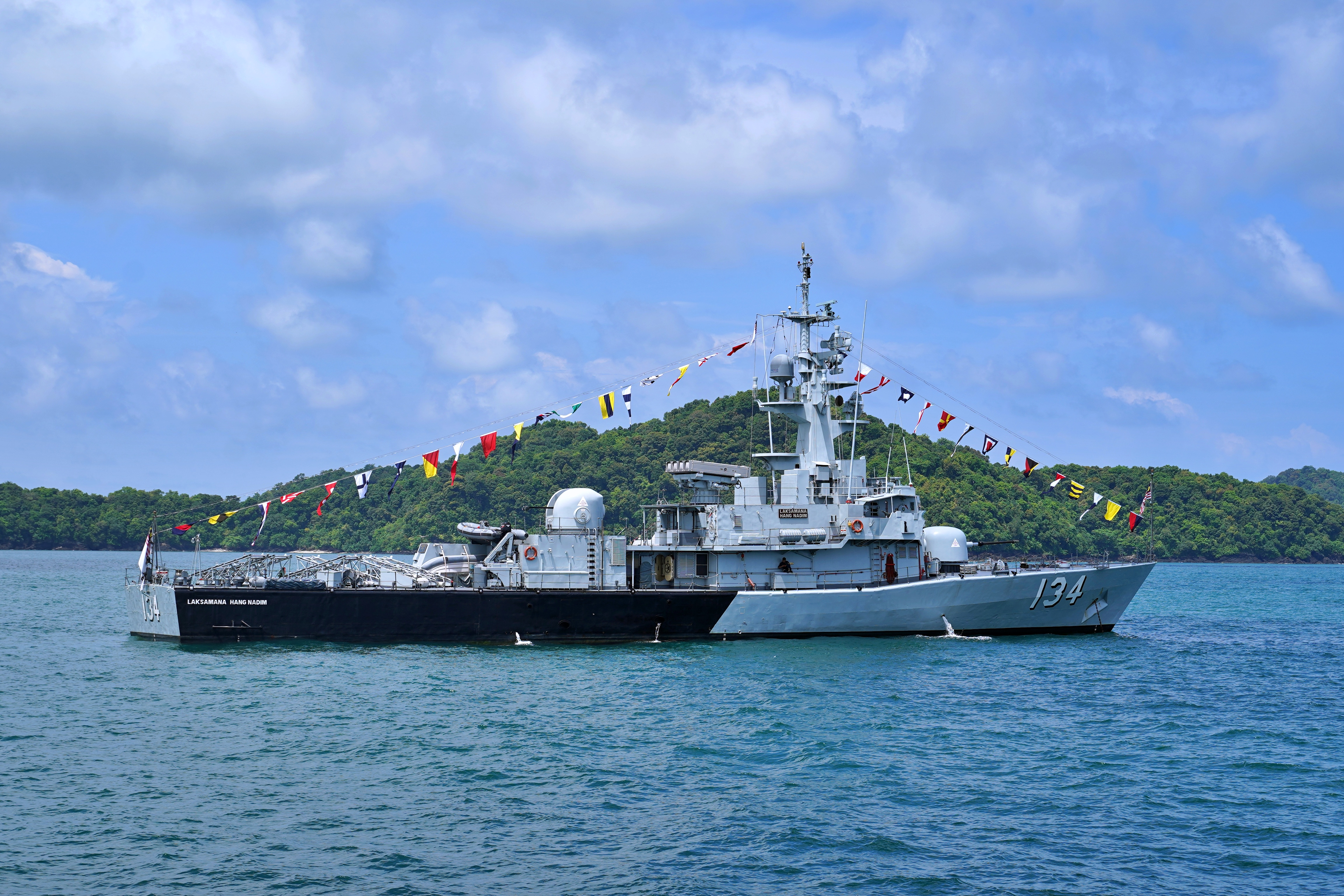
KD Laksamana Hang Nadim (F134) in Langkawi, 2023.

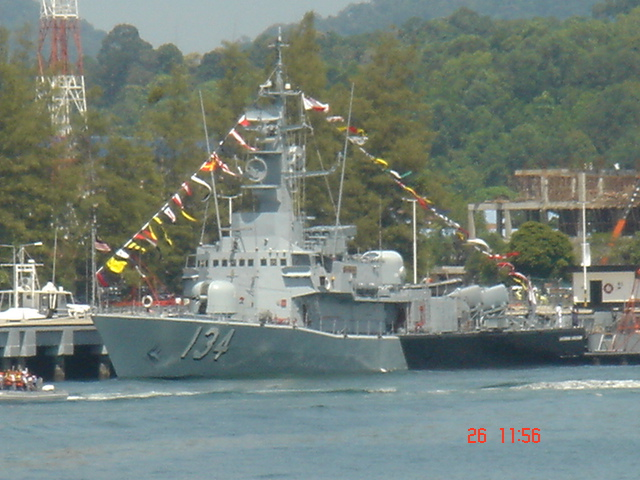
KD Laksamana Hang Nadim (F134).

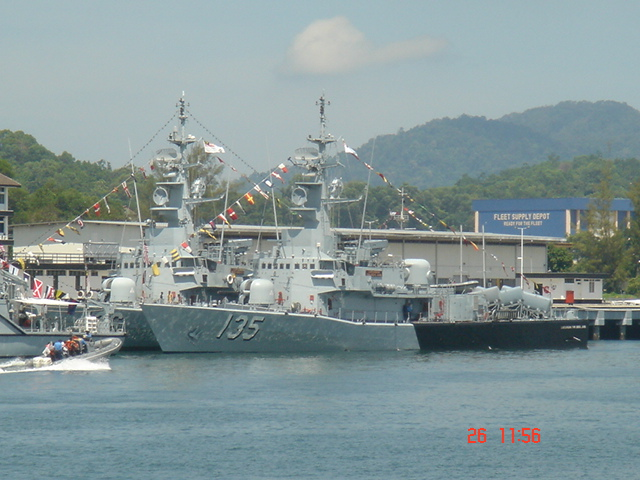
KD Laksamana Tun Abdul Jamil (F135).

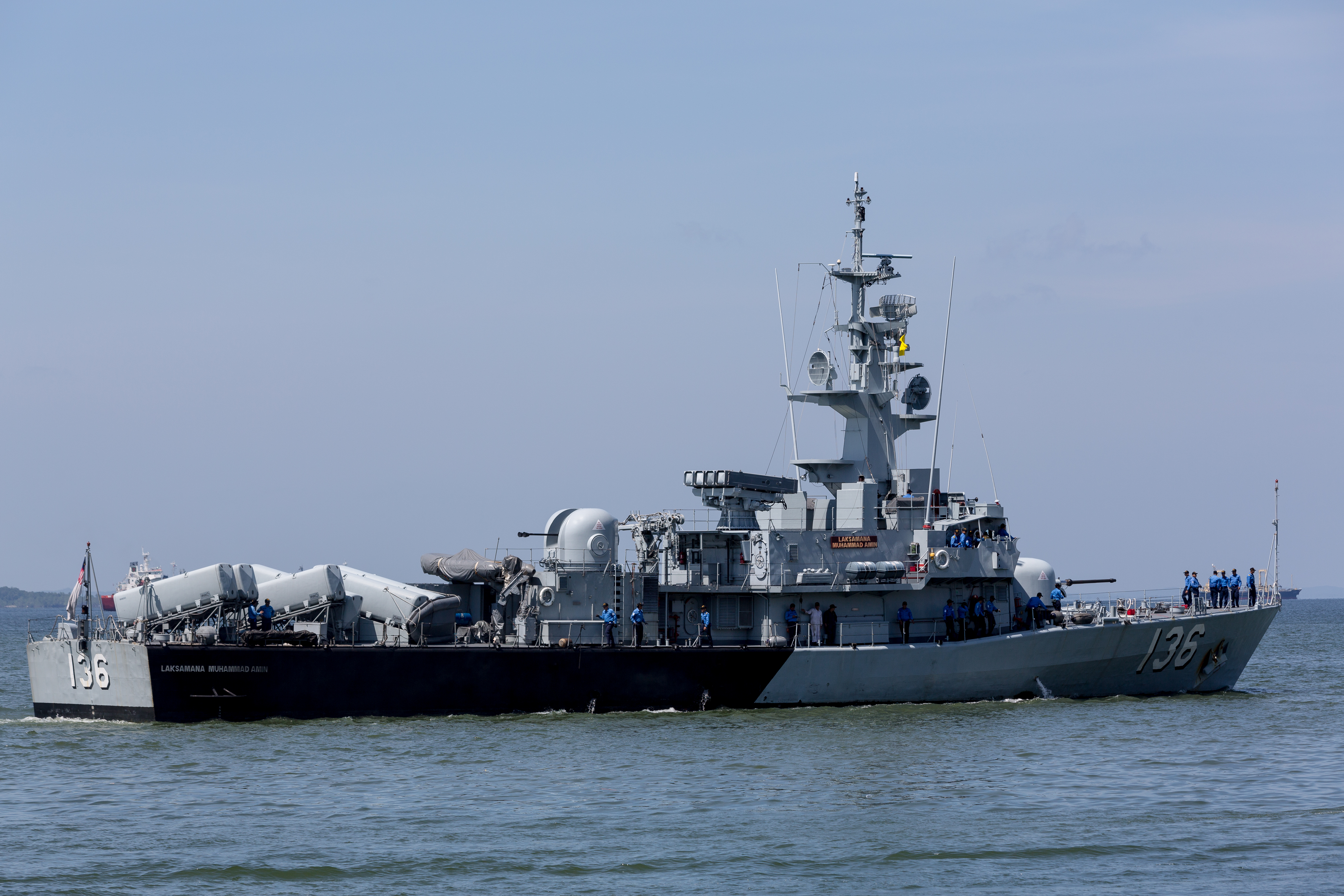
KD Laksamana Muhammad Amin (F136) in Sandakan.

== See also ==
- Assad-class corvette – An Iraqi Navy ship class based on the same Type 550 design.
- List of naval ship classes in service
