= Otomat =

French/Italian anti-ship and land-attack missile

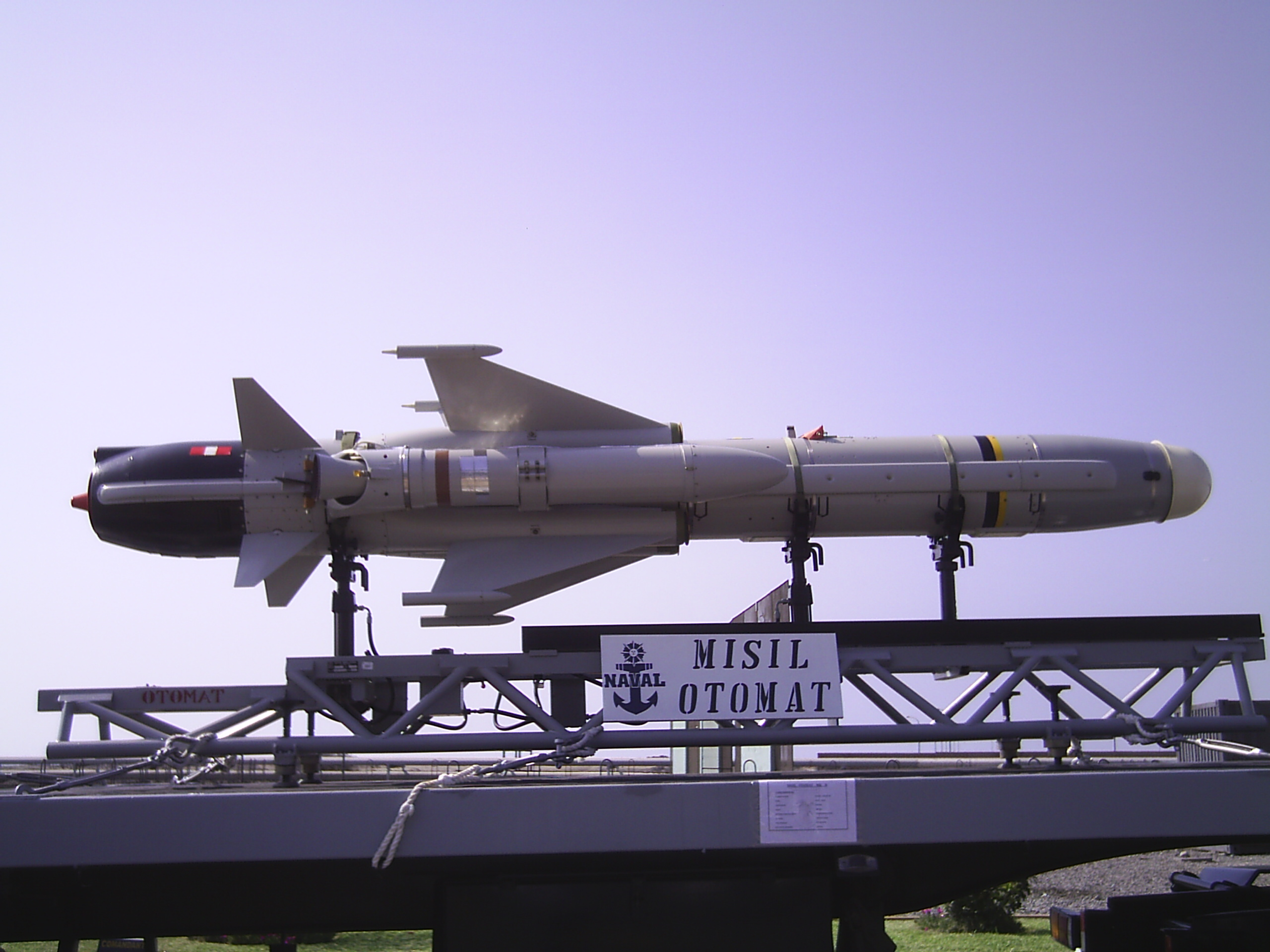
- Type: Anti-ship missile and land-attack missile
- Place of origin: Italy/France

Service history
- In service: 1977

Production history
- Manufacturer: MBDA

Specifications
- Mass: 780 kg (1,720 lb) with booster
- Length: 6 m (19.7 ft)
- Diameter: 400 mm (15.7 in)
- Warhead: 210 kg (463 lb)
- Detonation mechanism: Impact and proximity
- Engine: Turbojet engine
- Operational range: Otomat Mk 2 Block IV: 180 km (97 nmi); TESEO MK2/E: 350 km (190 nmi)+
- Maximum speed: 310 m/s (690 mph; 1,100 km/h; Mach 0.91)
- Guidance system: Inertial guidance, GPS and active radar homing
- Launch platform: Surface-launched

The Otomat is an anti-ship and coastal defence missile developed by the Italian company Oto Melara jointly with Matra and now made by MBDA. The name comes, for the first versions, from the name of the two builders ("Oto Melara" and "Matra") and, for the later versions, Teseo, from the Italian word for Theseus. The MILAS variant is an anti-submarine missile. In its latest version Mk/2E purchased by the Italian Navy is a medium range anti-ship and a land attack missile.

== Origins ==
The Otomat missile program started in 1967, the same year in which the Israeli destroyer Eilat was sunk by three Soviet-made P-15 Termit anti-ship missiles. This event raised awareness about the effectiveness of such weapons and prompted the development of similar systems in Western countries, such as the Harpoon in the United States. However, it is unknown whether the Otomat program started before or after the Eilat event.

The Otomat program was undertaken by the Italian Oto Melara corporation in cooperation with the French Matra Corporation. The aim was to develop an anti-ship missile powered by a turbofan which would allow more range and a heavier warhead than rocket-powered missiles then being developed in Europe such as the French Exocet and the German Kormoran. Trials started in 1971 and development of the Mk1 version of the Otomat officially ended in 1974.

However, at that time, the French Navy chose the wholly French Exocet over the Franco-Italian Otomat as its standard anti-ship missile. Thus, the Italian Navy remained as the only launch customer for the missile; it entered service in January 1976, before the commissioning of the warship intended to carry it, the Lupo-class frigate. These early Otomat missiles lacked a data link for over-the-horizon targeting, which limited its effective range to 60 kilometres (37 mi) a similar figure to the Exocet. To solve this problem, development of an Mk2 version started in May 1973, with a first test launch in January 1974, development completed in 1976, and the first over-the-horizon launch in 1978. By the end of 1976 OTO Melara had reported that 210 Otomats had been sold: Italy 48, Peru 40, Venezuela 12, and Libya 110. Also at this time there were negotiations under way for the sale of 296 more missiles to various nations (i.e. Italy 48, Egypt 30, Venezuela 48, Libya 120, Indonesia 50).

A Mk2 Block II version was introduced in the 1980s, it featured folding wings so that the missile could now fit in a smaller launch box. This reduction in size allowed a doubling in the number of missiles carried, usually from four to eight. Even so, Otomat Mk2 Block II remained bulkier than contemporary versions of Harpoon and Exocet missiles due to its greater diameter and its boosters being fitted to its flanks instead of in the rear.

== Description ==
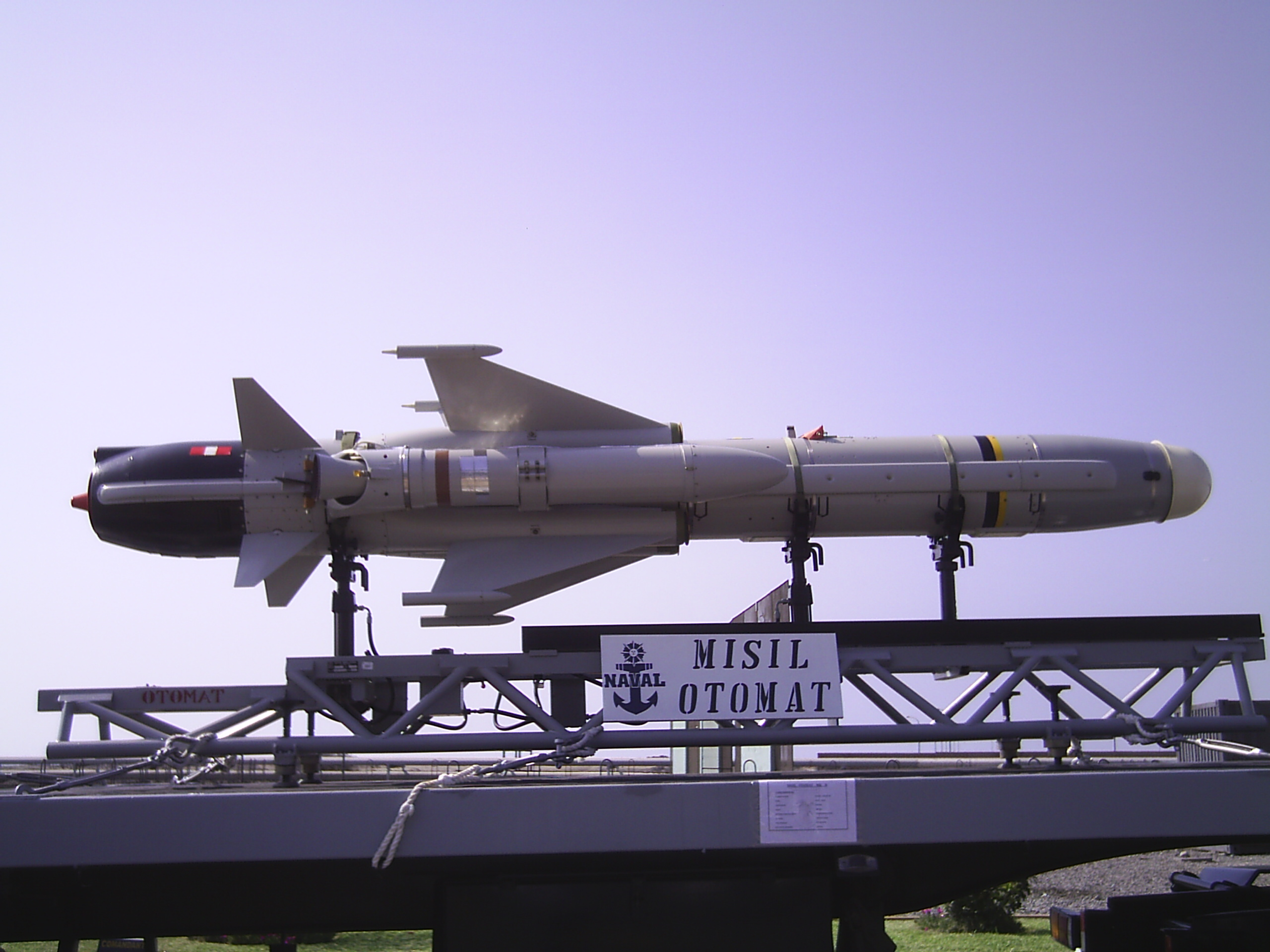
Otomat Mk.2 in service with the Peruvian Navy. Note the lateral boosters and the air intakes at mid fuselage.

The Otomat is a long-range anti-ship missile capable of reaching around 180 kilometres (110 mi) at an average speed of 1,000–1,100 kilometres per hour (620–680 mph). It is stored and launched in a fiberglass box which weighs 1,610 kilograms (3,550 lb) fully loaded. This container has a rectangular shape to accommodate the fixed wings of the missile and an inclination of 15 degrees. At launch, the boosters propel the missile up to a height of 200 metres (660 ft) before the main engine starts and a descent to 20 m (66 ft) is made. Otomat Mk2 missiles have a data-link for mid-course updates. They are designed to strike their targets in a 180 m (590 ft) dive or in a sea-skimming mode at an altitude of 2 m (6 ft 7 in) with a 210 kg (460 lb) warhead capable piercing up to 80 millimetres (3.1 in) of steel. The warhead is designed to explode inside the ship with the force of the explosion directed to the bottom of the target ship.

Technical data are: 4.46 m (14.6 ft) length, 40 centimetres (16 in) diameter, 1.35 wingspan, 780 kilograms (1,720 lb) launch weight.

The mid-fuselage fuel tank has a capacity of 90 litres (20 imp gal; 24 US gal). Behind the fuel tank is a Turboméca TR-281 Arbizon III engine, a simple turbo-jet. The twin ROXEL boosters weigh 75 kilograms (165 lb) each, and provide an acceleration of 6 g for four seconds. The Arbizon III has 400 kilograms per tonne (900 lb/long ton) and is about 50% more powerful than the Harpoon's engine, a Willis turbojet that has 272 kg/t (610 lb/long ton).

Unusually, the Otomat has four air intakes (for comparison, Harpoon and Tomahawk missiles have only one), all placed forward the wings at mid-fuselage. This contributes to the characteristic, complex shape of the missile.

Power available has made possible to fit in the bulky fuselage a high fuel reserve, heavy warhead and a data-link (Mk 2 model) to receive updates, at least once when in flight to the target.

The flight controls are four foldable steerable main wingszand four tail control winglets. Structure is made of light alloys, mainly aluminium. The Radar active seeker has a range, in the Italian version, of around 8 km (5.0 mi) with a medium-sized target, but usually it is activated at a shorter distance (see typical mission).

The warhead is in the front, behind the radar section and in front of the radio-altimeter and some other electronic systems. The HE warhead is of the semi-armor-piercing type and has a 65 kg (143 lb) Hertol type filler (for comparison, Kormoran missiles have 165 kg (364 lb) warheads, 56 kg (123 lb) is the HE main charge, plus 16 radial small charges to explode well inside the ship after the main explosion, and the armor-piercing capability is around 7–8 cm (2.8–3.1 in)).

In a typical layout, there are 4–8 fiberglass boxes, with the missile inside, held by a rail in the roof. The overall weight is 1,610 kg (3,550 lb).

Data-links are included in the TESEO or ERATO control systems. ERATO has computerized consoles CLIO, while TESEO has MM/OJ-791 consoles, weighing 570 kg (1,260 lb) with 4 kilowatts (5.4 hp) electric power requirement. The Data-link is called the PRT400 system, and the components are the PTR402 designation for missile (as receiver), PRT401 designation for the transmitter (shipborn) or PTR403 (carried by helicopter). Other systems that can be fitted include the PRT404 system for light ships and the PRT405 system for helicopters.

Overall strengths of this missile are long range, speed, sea-skimming capabilities and a powerful warhead.

Weakness are the need for a helicopter for mid-course guidance and a quite difficult uplink in the TESEO system (at least in the original model), big dimensions (affecting radar cross section RCS and IR signature), the lack of complex manoeuvres (synchronization of attacks, re-engagement capabilities, ECCM capability not up to current standards and never publicized), and the availability of surface versions only: no submarine and aircraft versions were developed.

This caused problems to the services that acquired these anti-ship missiles: Italian forces use Otomat (ships), Marte (helicopters), Kormoran (Tornados), Harpoons (not confirmed for submarines). Given the necessity to buy other totally different missile systems, many customers simply bought a 'family of missile systems' as in the Harpoon series and the Exocet family with obvious operative and economic advantages.

== Typical mission ==
No particular maneuvers are required by the ship; the missiles are capable of changing course after the launch up to 200° so all the missiles in the ship could be used against the same target in one attack.

This allows for quick reaction times, as the ship does not need to change direction to reveal the missile batteries. This allows the ship to fire all missiles against a target regardless of where they are placed aboard.

=== Flight ===
The boosters made by ROXEL are positioned at the flanks. They give enough speed to allow the turbojet to start, while the wings open. Four seconds later, once the missile reaches a 250 m/s speed and 200 m height, it stabilizes its flight and descends to 20 m, cruising at low altitude. At this time, the auto-pilot and the altimeter hold the right directions to the target. The missile flies at around 1,000 km/h, controlled with the four cross winglets in the aft, which are behind the main fixed wings to stabilize the weapon.

Mid-course update is possible with several systems. This weapon system is called TESEO (only the missile is called Otomat) in the Italian Navy, and the course correction is given by two channels: by the ship itself (TG-1) and with external sources, available in the Agusta Bell AB-212 ASW helicopter's final production batch (TG-2).

While the missiles flies it receive the input at mid-course. Then, at only 6 km from the target, it activates the onboard radar to reduce reaction time from the target. There are two models: the simpler ST-2 made by SMA (Italian missiles) and the more complex and ambitious CSF 'Col vert', for French made missiles. The CSF is only for export, since the French Navy has not adopted them. There is a large difference in the seekers. The first is a one axis, two dimensional radar system: the weapon simply continues to fly to the ship, with the altitude falling from 20 m to, in good sea conditions, 2-3m. The warhead is heavy, weighing 210 kg (Exocet 165, Harpoon 227) and the explosive blast is focused downward, attempting to blast a hole in the ship's bottom sinking rather than just damaging the vessel. The Col Vert version of the missile performs pop up flight to 180 m at around 2 km from the target and then dives on the ship, aiming at the decks to maximize damage.

The Col Vert version seems to have suffered problems in service with issues from sea state wave clutter. The popup and final dive attack of the Col Vert version of Otomat were designed to fool CIWS fire solutions. A similar approach was used in the US Harpoon system, then abandoned. Sensors in this variant are more complex and costly than the simpler sea skimming models, and while more capable to penetrate air defenses, they may have not shown a decisive superiority, even if technologically more sophisticated.

=== Mid-course datalink ===
The mid-course data uplink was originally provided by two different systems: TESEO and ERATO.

The ERATO (Extended Range Air Targeting for Otomat) system, used by the Al-Madinah class frigates, is the French version for mid-course guidance of the Otomat missile. In this case updated target information is provided to the ship which controls up to 16 missiles. This allows a multi-ship launch (Madinas have eight missiles each) and single ship control of an Otomat salvo for coordinated attack. The downside of this system is that the Otomat missile must rise to a 900-meter altitude to achieve uplink data. This could theoretically warn a target ship of the impending attack, but there are few possibilities to notice such small missiles at ranges of more than a few dozen kilometers. Maximum range for data-link is 100 km, limiting somewhat the missile's maximum range. It is possible to send up to six corrections for each missile, and attack up to six different targets at once. Consoles are called CLIO, integrated with ship's combat system.

TESEO is used by the Italian Navy and does not need altitude variations in the flight for missiles.

The limiting factor with the Otomat as incorporated in the TESEO system is that the AB-212 ASW Helo platform used for update has a limited radar range of no more than 60 km (with a 2,000 m2 RCS target, typically a frigate or destroyer), and will be hovering and stationary to allow the missile to fly under it and guide Otomat to its target. If the target ship has a medium-range SAM suite like RIM-66 Standard missiles, and is aware of the danger (with radar and ESM suites), the AB-212 Helo's lifespan could be limited to mere seconds, as it is much bigger than anti-ship missiles.

TESEO system requires that the missile fly under the helicopter, allowing the engagement of only one target at a time (even if with two missiles), the missiles must be launched to helicopter and so, this one must fly practically fixed for several minutes, while the missiles must fly a longer flight path, being this launch a non linear flight path.

In addition, the AB-212 Helo is old, slow and vulnerable to any air platform with even minimal AAW capabilities. AB-212ASW speed is listed at 196 km/h, slower than the land model AB 212, with 185 km/h max. cruise speed. The other widespread naval helicopters, Westland Lynx, Eurocopter Dauphin and Sikorsky Seahawks are all far faster and the four-bladed main rotor system permits greater agility, vs the older two-bladed rotors. There is also concern about ECM measures against older weapons system with a relatively primitive uplink system. A further complication is that the AB-212 will take up to an hour to reach Otomat's maximum range (in the meanwhile, a jet interceptor can fly easily for more than 900 km), as time in combat is a valuable commodity. All these problems are at least partially solved in Madina' frigates, that have ERATO data link system and AS-365 Dauphin helicopters, capable of almost 300 km/h.

== Developments ==
A version called Otomach was proposed as a further improvement on the Mk2, with a speed of Mach 1.8. However, further evaluations found that stealth was better than speed at penetrating warship defenses so the project was dropped. In 1992, the Italian government started the development of a new generation anti-ship missile designated Otomat Mk3 with a dispersement of 19 million units. Meanwhile, the French Navy chose to pursue the ANS/ANNG/ANF project for a supersonic missile, thereby ending French involvement in the development of the Otomat.

The Mk3 version was named at one point Ulisse, the Italian name for the mythical hero Odysseus. With development starting twenty years after the Mk1 version, the Mk3 was a quite different weapon. The guidance package was updated with new IR and radar sensors in the nose, a GPS navigation system and an updated data link to allow the engagement of coastal targets. To improve the missile chances of hitting, its nose and wing shapes were optimized for a reduced radar cross section (RCS). Range was improved to 250–300 km while keeping the same dimensions of the previous versions. The warhead was kept at 210 kg but fitted with an armored casing and less sensitive explosives which lowered its chances of being destroyed by close-in weapon systems. Three Otomat missiles were test launched in 1994–1995 with IR guidance and the new data link with good results. At this stage, an air-launched version was also considered for improved versatility. The United States Navy (USN) showed interest in this missile for many years as an intermediate system between the Harpoon and the Tomahawk. However, the USN withdrew from the program in 1999 and it was soon canceled as the Italian Navy was unable to fully fund its development.

The latest version of the Otomat is the Mk2 Block IV, also called Teseo Mk2/A. It has a new data link which allows its flight to be controlled from the ship via the Teseo system in a similar way to Erato. GPS is also fitted allowing programmable flight trajectories with complex paths. The Italian Navy ordered 38 missiles of this version, 27 for operational use and 11 for training purposes with an estimated in-service date of 2008. ROKETSAN, a Turkish missile manufacturer, signed an agreement in 2010 with MBDA to design, develop, and produce the new generation of rocket engines for the Otomat.

=== MILAS ===
MILAS
- Type: Anti-submarine missile

Service history
- In service: 2002
- Used by: Italian Navy

Production history
- Manufacturer: MBDA

Specifications
- Mass: 800 kg (1,764 lb)
- Length: 6.0 m (19.7 ft)
- Diameter: 460 mm (18.1 in)
- Warhead: MU90 torpedo
- Engine: Turbojet engine
- Operational range: >35 km (19 nmi)
- Launch platform: Container launcher

A separate path led to the development of MILAS, an anti-submarine variant of the Otomat Mk2. It is bigger than Otomat, 6 m (20 ft) long and 800 kg (1,800 lb), and delivers a MU90 torpedo to a range of over 35 kilometres (19 nmi). It started in 1986 as a Franco-Italian program for a missile capable of delivering a lightweight anti-submarine torpedo. The first test launch took place in 1989, ten more launches with torpedoes fitted had taken place by 1993. Tests ended in 1999, however, by that time France had lost interest in the system even though it had originally proposed the idea as a replacement for its own Malafon system. Thus, Milas entered service in 2002 with the Italian Navy only, after almost 20 years of development. Milas is an all weather day/night system that can put a torpedo in the water 35 km from its launch platform within three minutes and update its impact point in flight.

Milas missiles are in service on the two Durand de la Penne-class destroyers and the 4 anti-submarine FREMM frigates of the Italian Navy.

The only other variant in service is a coastal defense version bought by Egypt and Saudi Arabia, and ordered by Iraq but never delivered to that country. All necessary electronics are trailer-mounted as well as twin missile launchers, which makes it a high mobility system. Even so, Iraq had planned to deploy it in fixed armored sites.

== Testing and the future of Otomat ==
There is no known combat use of Otomat but there were many tests. In 1987, a Venezuelan Lupo-class frigate hit an old US destroyer used as target at 122 km, leaving a 6 m hole in it. Flight took a little over 400 seconds. In another example, at least 8 missiles were purchased by the US Navy: thanks to a new evasive maneuver, the majority of these weapons, called LRAT (Long Range Autonomous Target) penetrated inside the formidable missile defenses of US ships.

All in all, this missile was and is a very powerful weapon. Without helicopter provided mid-course guidance (especially in presence of dangerous high-speed enemy dogfighters), this weapon is still capable of striking well over the horizon. A range of 50 km can be covered with the ship's own sensors and missiles like MM38 Exocet are at their optimum. Between 50 and 120 km is the range that weapons like Harpoon, which have over the horizon capabilities but no data-link updater, come into play. At ranges longer than that a target moving in unpredicted directions will give such weapons little or no chance to acquire their target. Finally, over 120 km is where the need for a long-range weapon, external targeting platforms and data-linked updates come into play as only with course and target position updating can any long-range missile have a chance of engaging a moving target at these ranges. This is the typical capability of the Otomat, and long-range soviet missiles or French Exocet MM.40 Block 3 (>180 km). In short-range engagements, the Otomat does not have any advantage since it is bigger than other missiles and presents a larger target to shoot down.

There has been a strong resurgence in naval military orders from Fincantieri shipyards, including seven ships for the Qatari Navy (four corvettes, two offshore patrol vessels, and a landing platform dock (LPD) similar to the 8,800-ton Kalaat Béni Abbès), the US Freedom-class littoral combat ship, an LPD (with EMPAR) for Algeria, and the UAE Abu Dhabi class corvette. The Qatari order in particular was strongly contested between Italy and France, and one of the largest recent naval contracts worldwide. This resurgence, and a planned update of the Otomat system, should further enhance orders of Otomat and Marte systems. A contract was signed on 1 September 2016 between MBDA Italy and Qatar for the sale of coastal Marte ER missiles.

== Submodels ==
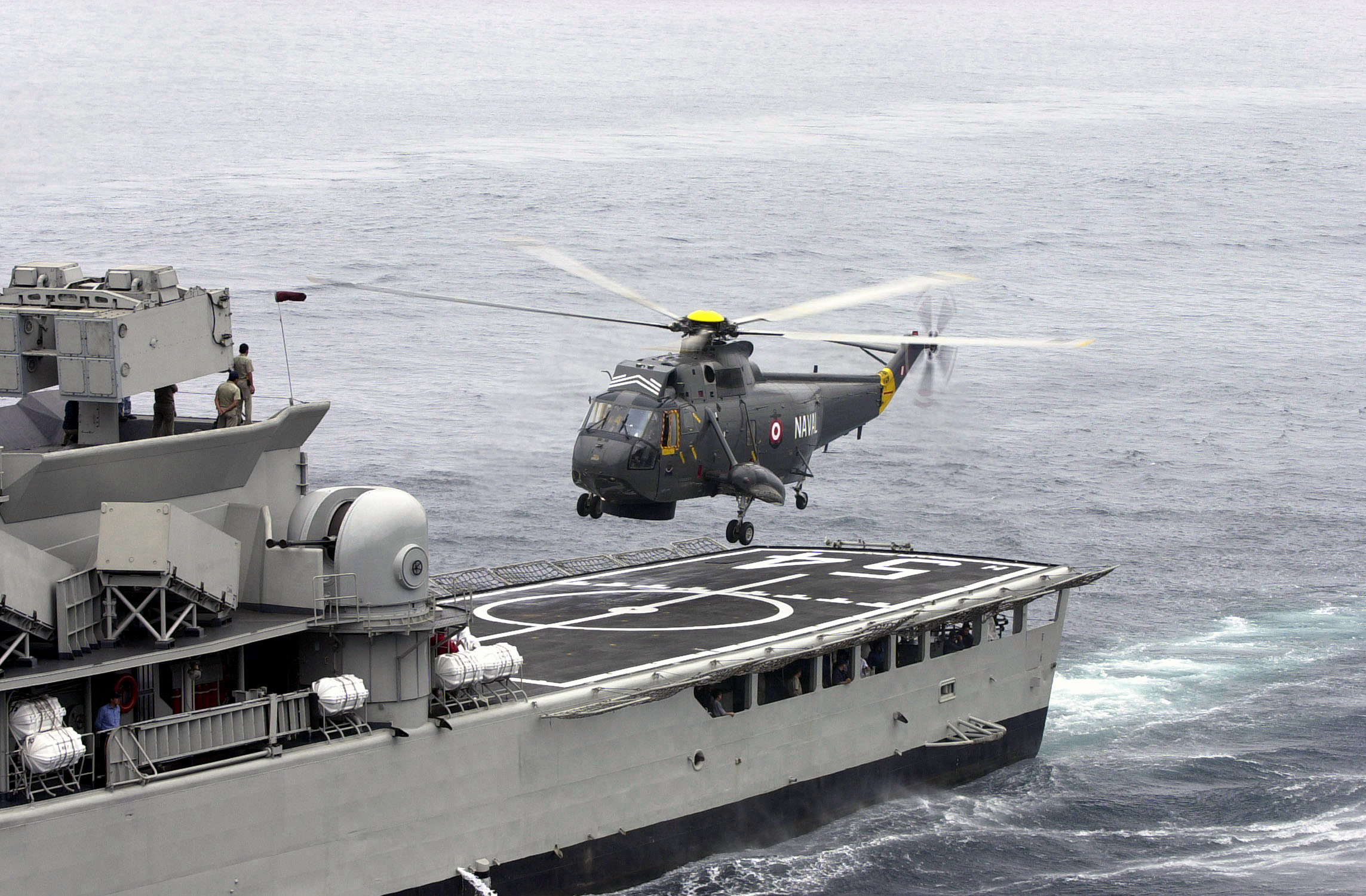
In the low part, left sector of this image there are two Otomat launch boxes in the former, rectangular models linked to Mk 1/Mk 2 Block 1. The ship is a Peruvian Navy Lupo-class frigate.

There are significant differences between Otomat versions. The only component that has remained the same is the engine. In the mid-1990s production exceeded 900 missiles (compared to 3,000 Exocets and 6,000 Harpoons).

This is the complete family, in chronological order:

- Otomat Mk 1: first model, without data link, 60 km practical range, service from 1976
- Otomat Mk 2 Block I: first model with data-link, 180 km range, first over-the-horizon launch in 1978
- Otomat Mk 2 Block II: it had foldable wings, allowing the use of smaller boxes, and so using two missiles instead of one. It started to appear in the 1980s, though it took considerable time to replace the first model.
- Otomat Mk 2 Block III: new INS navigation system, 'insensible' warhead, new, safer solid propellant for boosters, improved data link to allow TESEO to guide missiles also from the ship directly. It is not known when it entered service.
- Otomat Mk 3/NGASM/ULISSE: new version with longer range, stealth design (both shape and materials), IRST sensor coupled with the radar and GPS, land attack capabilities. Development started at the beginning of '90s. The US Navy was interested but didn't adopt the system and the Italian Navy abandoned the project, the cost being too high for the Italian navy alone.
- MILAS: ASW version with a light torpedo in the nose. Weights 800 kg (including torpedo), 6-meter length, 0.46-meter diameter, and 5 km to 35+ km effective range, compatible with Otomat standard systems. The MILAS program started in the 1980s, and was finally adopted only by Italian Navy, the French Navy withdrawing from the program due to cost.
- Otomat Mk 2 Block IV: also called Teseo Mk2/A (for the Italian Navy, with a new electronic set, partially derived from Marte Mk 2/S missile program. The missile has a range of 180 kilometres. The TG-2 (data-link for helicopters) is abolished, because the ship is capable to guide the missile directly (as happened with ERATO) with information given by external platform with OTH engagements. The missile is capable of: re-attack, 3-D mission planning, coordinate attacks, capability to operate in littoral theaters, and attack with terminal evasive maneuvers. GPS is added and so the weapon can attack also land targets. In May 2006, Teseo MK2/A was successfully test-fired for the first time. This variant will in due course be deployed on the Italian variant of the Franco-Italian FREMM frigate. Teseo MK2/A has entered service with the Italian Navy in 2007. Available on the export market and has been purchased by export customers as of 2008.
- Otomat Mk 2 E: the Italian Navy has acquired the new MBDA heavy-duty missile TESEO MK / 2E (TESEO "EVO") with also a strategic land attack capability for the attack of ground targets (the latter capacity, currently only possessed by the Air Force Military with the STORM SHADOW missile). In this regard it is considering the possibility of equipping the missile with a new terminal "head" with dual RF seeker (Radio Frequency) and, presumably, given the need to attack pure ground targets, IIR (IR imaging). Compared to the predecessor OTOMAT / TESEO, the TESEO "EVO" has a double range, more than 360 km.

== Operators ==
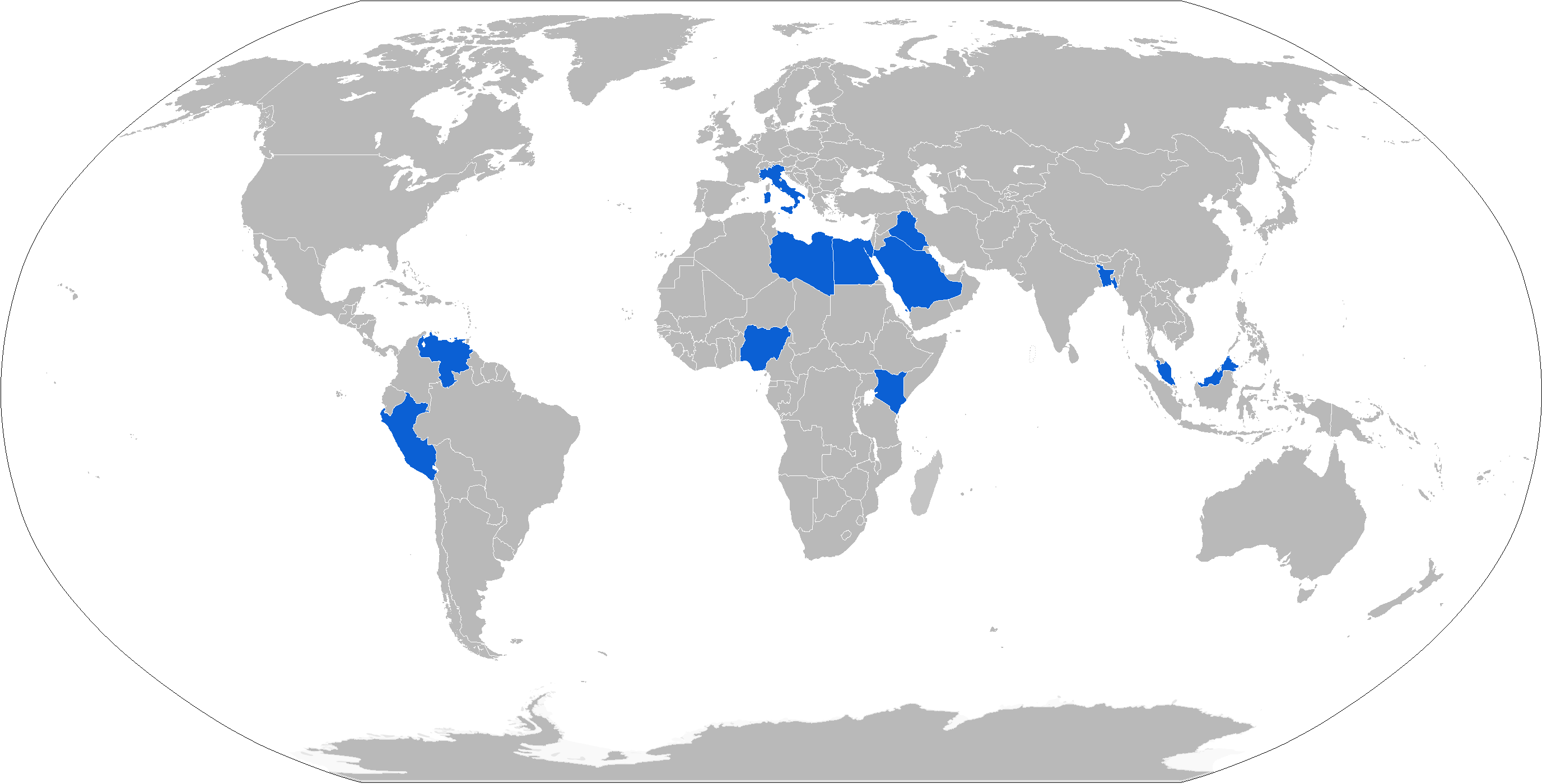
Map with Otomat operators in blue

=== Current operators ===
Navy	Ship class	Ships	Submodel	Notes
Italian Navy	Horizon-class destroyer	2	Teseo Mk2/A (4 double launchers)	Previously launchers embarked on follows written off ships: 4 double for Otomat Mk2 x 1 Giuseppe Garibaldi (ship not written-off but missiles removed); 4 single for Otomat Mk2 x 1 Vittorio Veneto-class cruiser; 4 double for Otomat Mk2 x 2 Audace-class destroyers; 8 single for Otomat Mk1 x 4 Lupo-class frigates; 8 double for Otomat Mk2 x 1 Artigliere-class frigate; 2 single for Otomat Mk1 x 7 Sparviero-class patrol boats
Italian Navy	Durand de la Penne-class destroyer	2	Teseo Mk2/A (2 double launchers) and Milas (2 double launchers)	Previously launchers embarked on follows written off ships: 4 double for Otomat Mk2 x 1 Giuseppe Garibaldi (ship not written-off but missiles removed); 4 single for Otomat Mk2 x 1 Vittorio Veneto-class cruiser; 4 double for Otomat Mk2 x 2 Audace-class destroyers; 8 single for Otomat Mk1 x 4 Lupo-class frigates; 8 double for Otomat Mk2 x 1 Artigliere-class frigate; 2 single for Otomat Mk1 x 7 Sparviero-class patrol boats
Italian Navy	Bergamini-class frigate (FREMM GP)	2	Teseo Mk2/A (4 double launchers)	Previously launchers embarked on follows written off ships: 4 double for Otomat Mk2 x 1 Giuseppe Garibaldi (ship not written-off but missiles removed); 4 single for Otomat Mk2 x 1 Vittorio Veneto-class cruiser; 4 double for Otomat Mk2 x 2 Audace-class destroyers; 8 single for Otomat Mk1 x 4 Lupo-class frigates; 8 double for Otomat Mk2 x 1 Artigliere-class frigate; 2 single for Otomat Mk1 x 7 Sparviero-class patrol boats
Italian Navy	Margottini-class frigate (FREMM ASW)	4	Teseo Mk2/A (2 double launchers) and Milas (2 double launchers)	Previously launchers embarked on follows written off ships: 4 double for Otomat Mk2 x 1 Giuseppe Garibaldi (ship not written-off but missiles removed); 4 single for Otomat Mk2 x 1 Vittorio Veneto-class cruiser; 4 double for Otomat Mk2 x 2 Audace-class destroyers; 8 single for Otomat Mk1 x 4 Lupo-class frigates; 8 double for Otomat Mk2 x 1 Artigliere-class frigate; 2 single for Otomat Mk1 x 7 Sparviero-class patrol boats
Italian Navy	Maestrale-class frigate	7	Teseo Mk2 (4 double launchers)	Previously launchers embarked on follows written off ships: 4 double for Otomat Mk2 x 1 Giuseppe Garibaldi (ship not written-off but missiles removed); 4 single for Otomat Mk2 x 1 Vittorio Veneto-class cruiser; 4 double for Otomat Mk2 x 2 Audace-class destroyers; 8 single for Otomat Mk1 x 4 Lupo-class frigates; 8 double for Otomat Mk2 x 1 Artigliere-class frigate; 2 single for Otomat Mk1 x 7 Sparviero-class patrol boats
Italian Navy	Artigliere-class frigate	2	Teseo Mk2 (8 double launchers)	Previously launchers embarked on follows written off ships: 4 double for Otomat Mk2 x 1 Giuseppe Garibaldi (ship not written-off but missiles removed); 4 single for Otomat Mk2 x 1 Vittorio Veneto-class cruiser; 4 double for Otomat Mk2 x 2 Audace-class destroyers; 8 single for Otomat Mk1 x 4 Lupo-class frigates; 8 double for Otomat Mk2 x 1 Artigliere-class frigate; 2 single for Otomat Mk1 x 7 Sparviero-class patrol boats
Libyan Navy	Vosper Mk.7-class frigate	1	Otomat Mk1	The frigate (Dat Assawari) is now a training hulk Two not operational
Libyan Navy	La Combattante IIa-class fast attack craft	9	Otomat Mk1	The frigate (Dat Assawari) is now a training hulk Two not operational
Peruvian Navy	De Zeven Provinciën-class cruiser	1	Otomat Mk2	
Peruvian Navy	Carvajal-class frigate	4	Otomat Mk2	
Peruvian Navy	Lupo-class frigate	4	Otomat Mk2	
Bolivarian Navy of Venezuela	Mariscal Sucre-class frigate	6	Otomat Mk2	
Bolivarian Navy of Venezuela	Federacion-class fast attack craft	3	Otomat Mk2	
Egyptian Navy	Ramadan-class missile boat	6	Otomat Mk2	Otomat Mk2 are also deployed in coastal defense batteries 2 units retired
Egyptian Navy	October-class missile boat	4	Otomat Mk1	Otomat Mk2 are also deployed in coastal defense batteries 2 units retired
Egyptian Navy	Bergamini-Class frigate (FREMM-GP)	2	Otomat Mk2/A	Otomat Mk2 are also deployed in coastal defense batteries 2 units retired
Royal Malaysian Navy	Laksamana-class corvette	4	Otomat Mk2	Retired
Bangladesh Navy	Ulsan-class frigate	1	Otomat Mk 2 Block IV	Installed on BNS Khalid Bin Walid
Nigerian Navy	MEKO 360H1-class frigate	1	Otomat Mk1	
Kenya Navy	Nyayo-class fast attack craft	2	Otomat Mk1	Removed during 2011 refitting
Royal Saudi Navy	Al-Medinah-class frigate	4	Otomat Mk2	Uses ERATO mid-course data uplink Otomat is also deployed in coastal batteries
Iraqi Navy	Assad-class corvette	2	Otomat Mk2	Interned at La Spezia, Italy since 1990

== Market ==
- Bangladesh – 10
  - 10 Otomat Mk 2 – Block IV (delivered in 2001 for BNS Khalid Bin Walid)
- Egypt – 135
  - 75 Otomat Mk 1 (25 delivered between 1975/1976 for October FAC, 50 delivered between 1981/1982 for Ramadan FAC)
  - 60 Otomat Mk 2 (delivered between 1980/1981 for coast defence systems)
- Italy – around 200 (not confirmed)
  - 48 Otomat Mk (1 sold to the end of 1976 for Lupo Class frigate)
  - 48 Otomat Mk 2 (programmed in 1976 for Maestrale Class frigate)
  - 38 Otomat Mk 2 – Block IVA / Teseo bought in 2006, fitted from storage missiles);
- Kenya – 20
  - 20 Otomat Mk 2 (delivered in 1987 for Province - Nyayo - FAC)
- Libya – 120
  - 30 Otomat Mk 1 (delivered between 1979/1981 for 4 Wadi corvettes)
  - 90 Otomat Mk 2 (80 delivered between 1982/1984 for Combattante-2G Type - Beir - FAC; 10 delivered in 1984 for Dat Assawari frigate)
- Malaysia – 48
  - 48 Otomat Mk 2 (12 delivered between 1998/2000 for Laksmana - Assad - corvettes; 12 delivered in 2000 for Laksmana - Assad - Class corvettes; 24 Otomat Mk 2 delivered between 2002/2004 for Laksmana - Assad - corvettes) - All retired
- Nigeria – 40
  - 40 Otomat Mk 1 (delivered between 1980/1981 for FPB-57 Type - Ekpe - FAC; 15 delivered in 1982 for MEKO-360 - Aradu - frigate)
- Peru – 81
  - 81 Otomat Mk 2 (60 delivered between 1979/1987 for Lupo - Carvajal - frigates; 15 delivered in 1988 for De Ruyter - Almirante Grau - cruiser; 6 delivered in 1998)
- Saudi Arabia – 225
  - 225 Otomat Mk 2 (75 delivered between 1985/1986 for F-2000S - Madina - frigates; 155 delivered between 1987/1988 for coast defence systems)
- (Turkmenistan) Turkmenistan – 15
  - 15 Otomat Mk 2 (ordered in 2019 for C-92 frigate)
- United States – 8 (at least)
  - 8 Otomat Mk 2 (delivered for test with US Navy)
- Venezuela – 140
  - 15 Otomat Mk 1 (delivered in 1975 for 3 Constitucion FAC)
  - 125 Otomat Mk 2 (delivered between 1980 and 1982 for Lupo - Sucre - frigates; 14 delivered between 1992 and 1993 in $17M deal; 11 delivered in 2000)

== See also ==
- Qader – (Iran)
- Atmaca – (Turkey)
- NASM-MR – (India)
- Babur – (Pakistan)
- SOM – (Turkey)
- Noor ASCM – (Iran)
- Zafar – (Iran)
- Khalij Fars – (Iran)
