= Iraqi Navy =

Maritime warfare branch of Iraq's military

- القوة البحرية العراقية
- Emblem of the Iraqi Navy
- Founded: 12 August 1937 (as Coastal Defense Force); 12 January 2005 (as the Iraqi Navy)
- Country: Iraq
- Type: Navy
- Role: Naval warfare
- Size: 3,000 personnel
- Part of: Iraqi Armed Forces
- Headquarters: Baghdad, Iraq
- Colors: Blue, White & Olive
- March: March of the Navy
- Anniversaries: 12 January
- Equipment: see below
- Engagements: World War II; Anglo-Iraqi War; Iran–Iraq War; Invasion of Kuwait; Gulf War; 2003 invasion of Iraq

Commanders
- Current commander: Maj. Gen. Hamid Resen

Insignia
- Ensign

- Flag

The Iraqi Navy (Arabic: القوة البحرية العراقية, romanized: al-Qūwah al-baḥrīyah al-ʻIrāqīyah), is the naval warfare service branch of the Armed forces of Iraq. Formed in 1937, initially as the Iraqi Coastal Defense Force, its primary responsibilities was the protection of Iraq's coastline and offshore assets, the official name was changed on 12 January 2005 to the Iraqi Navy.

As of February 2025, the Iraqi Navy comprised approximately 17,600 active personnel and 12,000 reserve personnel, organized into an operational headquarters, nine afloat squadrons, and three marine battalions.

Headed by Rear Admiral Muhammad Jawad, the navy had plans to build six Al Uboor-class patrol boats in Baghdad, with the first of the boats to enter service in September 2005. This project however, was ultimately canceled. Additionally, two Assad-class corvettes built for Iraq in the 1980s by Italy were originally planned to be delivered sometime around 2006–2007. The ships however, were found to be in a worse state than originally believed, forcing the Iraqi navy to reconsider the deal and instead buy 4, newer, smaller modified-Diciotti class vessels. The 5 British corvettes and 1 Soviet patrol boat operated by the Saddam Hussein-era Iraqi Navy were destroyed in the 1991 Gulf War and the 2003 U.S. invasion of Iraq, respectively.

The Iraqi Navy is designed for coastal water protection; preventing the smuggling of people, oil and weapons; and to protect the country's oil platforms. As a result, it mainly needs patrol boats. These may be backed up by fast attack craft. The patrol boats need to have the ability to launch rigid-inflatable boats (RIBs) for boarding ships and also possibly be able to accommodate a helicopter which would increase their patrol capability. The Iraqi Navy is building a second Marine battalion. In 2016 the Iraqi Navy awarded money to a ship maintenance company to sustain its current fleet of ships.

== History ==
=== Kingdom of Iraq ===
The Royal Iraqi Navy was formed in 1937 as a small four-ship force headquartered in Basra. Between 1937 and 1958, it was primarily a riverine force.

=== Iraqi Republic (pre-2003) ===
Ba'athist-era flag of the Iraqi Navy, used until 2003.

Following the 14 July Revolution of 1958, the Iraqi Navy began to expand. Operationally based in the port of Umm Qasr, the Arabic Gulf Academy for Sea Studies was established in Basra, which offered a bachelor's degree in war and engineering naval studies. By 1988, the Navy grew to a force of 5,000, but played a relatively small role during the 1980–1988 Iran–Iraq War. Much of the Navy was destroyed during Operation Pearl.

Between 1977 and 1987, the Iraqi Navy received eight Osa-class missile boats, armed with Styx anti-ship missiles, from the Soviet Union. It also purchased four Lupo-class frigates and six Assad-class corvettes from Italy, although these were never delivered because of international sanctions following the Iraqi invasion of Kuwait in 1990.

The Iraqi Navy was almost completely destroyed by Coalition air and naval forces during the Gulf War of 1991. Iraq lost 19 warships sunk and 6 damaged. In total, more than 100 Iraqi warships were destroyed. The Navy was not rebuilt and played little part in the Iraq War (2003). One exception was two mine warfare vessels captured by US Navy and Coast Guard units during the assault on Al Faw; The tug Jumariya, towing a well camouflaged minelaying barge, and the tug Al Raya, which had been outfitted as a minelayer itself. Of the units that remained by late 2002, most were in a poor state of repair and the crews were in a poor state of readiness. Whatever units that remained after 1991 were used primarily for safeguarding Saddam's palaces on the Tigris river.

=== Republic of Iraq (post-2003) ===
In January 2004, the Iraqi Coastal Defense Force (ICDF) officially began training its first 214 volunteers.

On 30 September 2004, the ICFD assumed the responsibility of protecting the Iraqi coastline, with actual patrol operations beginning the following day, on 1 October 2004.

On 11 November 2008, Rear Admiral Muhammad Jawad signed the historic non-legally binding Khawr Abd Allah Protocols or "KAA Protocols" at the Kuwait Naval Base. The protocols were the concept of the British Royal Navy in 2008 when in command of Combined Task Force 158 operating in the northern Gulf region and specifically within Iraqi territorial waters for the protection of the Iraqi oil terminals Al Basrah Oil Terminal and in support of Iraqi maritime boundaries. They are a non-legally binding military agreement aiding deconfliction between the maritime forces of Kuwait and Iraq in the Khawr Abd Allah waterway and are reflected in a former United Kingdom Hydrographic Office chart and which was re-titled the "KAA Interoperability Admiralty Chart".

The protocols were developed, written and mediated by a British Royal Marine barrister; Lieutenant Colonel David Hammond, RM; working alongside the heads and staffs of both the Kuwaiti Navy and Iraqi Navy and which saw the historic first meeting on board a British warship HMS Chatham (F87) on 8 May 2008. The protocols were historically ratified and signed on 11 November 2008 at Kuwait Naval Base in the presence of Vice-Admiral William Gortney, USN; commander of the United States Naval Forces Central Command based in Bahrain and remain an enduring success story in the region highlighting co-operation and co-ordination between the two countries.

On 30 April 2010, Iraqi naval forces took over responsibility for the protection of the Khawr al-Amaya and Basra oil terminals, as well as the ports of Umm Qasr and al-Zubair.

== Organization ==
=== Commands ===
Iraqi Naval Headquarters: Baghdad (Camp Victory).

May move to Umm Qasr.

Operational Headquarters: Umm Qasr

- Tactical Operations Center: Khawr al-Amaya Platform
- Tactical Operations Center: Al Basrah Platform

Naval Training Center: Umm Qasr

- NCO Academy
- Swiftboat Crew Training Course

Maritime Academy: Basrah

Diving Squadron: Umm Qasr

RHIBs

Patrol Squadron: Umm Qasr

PS701, PS702, PS703, PS704, PB301, PB302, PB303, and 5× U/I PBs.

Patrol Squadron: planned

Patrol Squadron: planned

Patrol Squadron: planned

Small Boat Squadron: Umm Qasr

Squadron equipped with American Defender Class boats.

Support & Auxiliary Squadron: Umm Qasr

=== Marines ===
1st Marine Brigade Special Troops Battalion: Basrah Log City

In December 2010 was redesignated 1st and moving to Basrah Log City. Reached full strength in 2011.

- 1st Marine (Wolverines) Battalion: Umm Qasr
- 2nd Marine Battalion: Umm Qasr/Az Zubayr
- 3rd Marine Battalion: Basrah Log City
- 1st Marine Bde Base Support Unit: Basrah Log City

2nd Marine Brigade Special Troops Battalion: planned

planned

=== Bases ===
Umm Qasr:

== Personnel ==
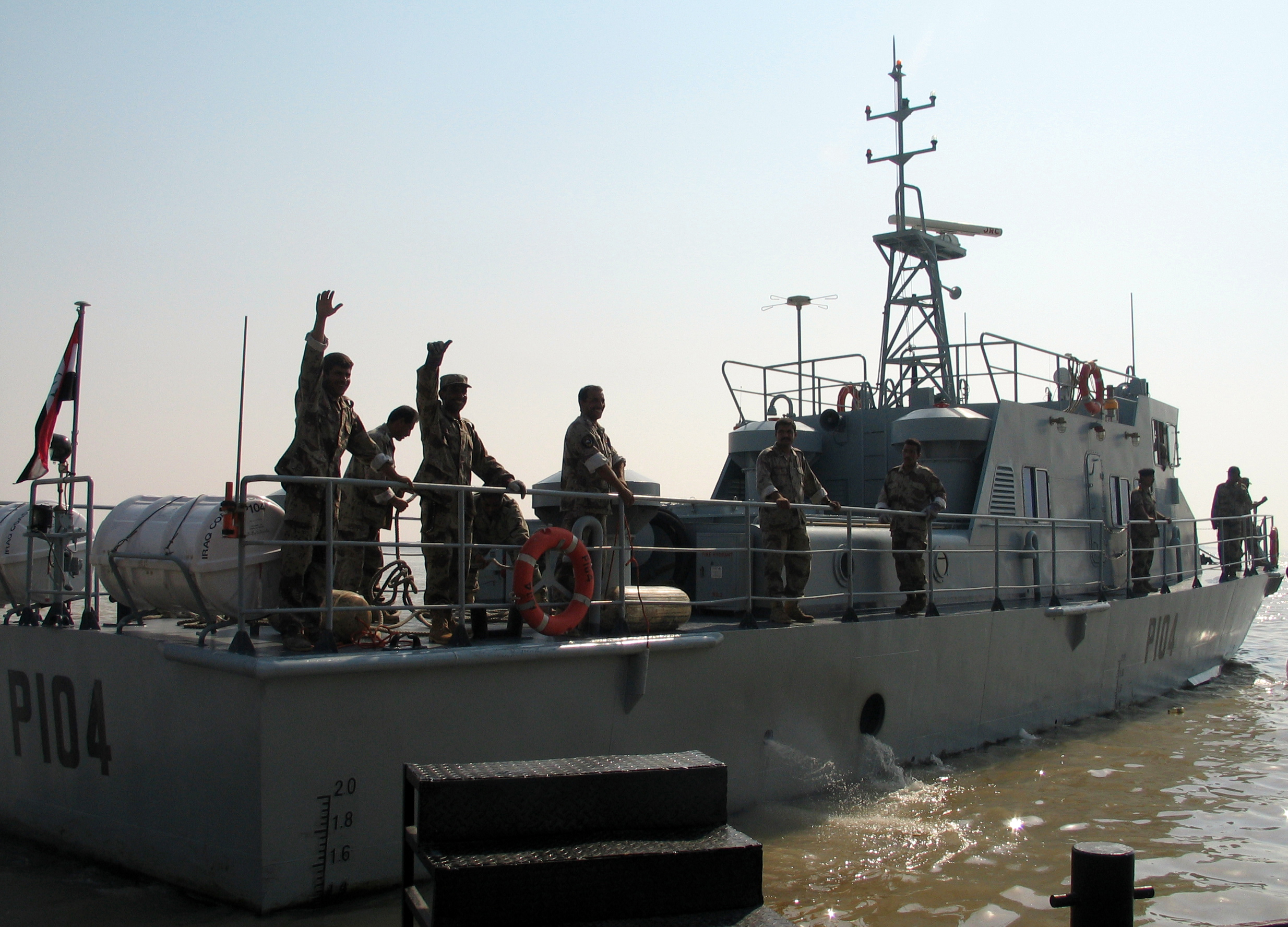
Umm Qasr, Iraq (30 Sept. 2004), Iraqi sailors celebrate as they get underway for the first time.

5,400 sailors and officers, in addition to 1600 in the Iraqi Naval Battalion (marines) who guard the platforms and the port of Umm Qasr.

Commanders	Dates
Vice Admiral Ali Hussain Ali	2009 to 2016
Rear Admiral Muafaq Najim Abid	2009 to 2020
Rear Admiral Ahmed Jasim	2020-

=== Ranks ===
==== Officers ====
Rank group	General/flag officers					Senior officers			Junior officers
Iraqi Navy
Iraqi Navy	مشیر; Mushir	فريق أول; Fariq 'awal	فريق; Fariq	لواء; Liwa	عميد; Amid	عقيد; Aqid	مقدم; Muqaddam	رائد; Ra'id	نقيب; Naqib	ملازم أول; Mulazim awwal	ملازم; Mulazim

==== Ratings ====
Rank group	Senior NCOs			Junior NCOs	Enlisted
Iraqi Navy
Iraqi Navy	نائب ضابط; Nayib dabit	رقيب أول; Rayiys eurafa	رقيب; Arif	نائب عريف; Nāyīb arīf	جندي أول; Jundi 'awwal	جندي; Jundi

== Equipment ==
=== Assad-class corvettes ===
A total of six ships were ordered by Iraq in the 1980s, but were never delivered as a result of the arms embargo imposed after the Gulf War in 1991. Four of the six ships were eventually purchased by the Royal Malaysian Navy in October 1995 as the Laksamana-class corvette, while the remaining two were mothballed at La Spezia. On 19 May 2017, it was reported that the remaining two vessels would be delivered to the Iraq Navy after 26 years. They eventually left La Spezia on a semi-submersible carrier Eide Trader on 22 May and reached Iraq in June 2017.

The ships were commissioned as the Musa ibn Nusayr (F210) and Tariq ibn Ziyad (F212). In September 2023, the Musa ibn Nusayr was found sunk in the port of Umm Qasr, though she was being salvaged as of November.

=== Saettia Mk4/Fattah OPV ===
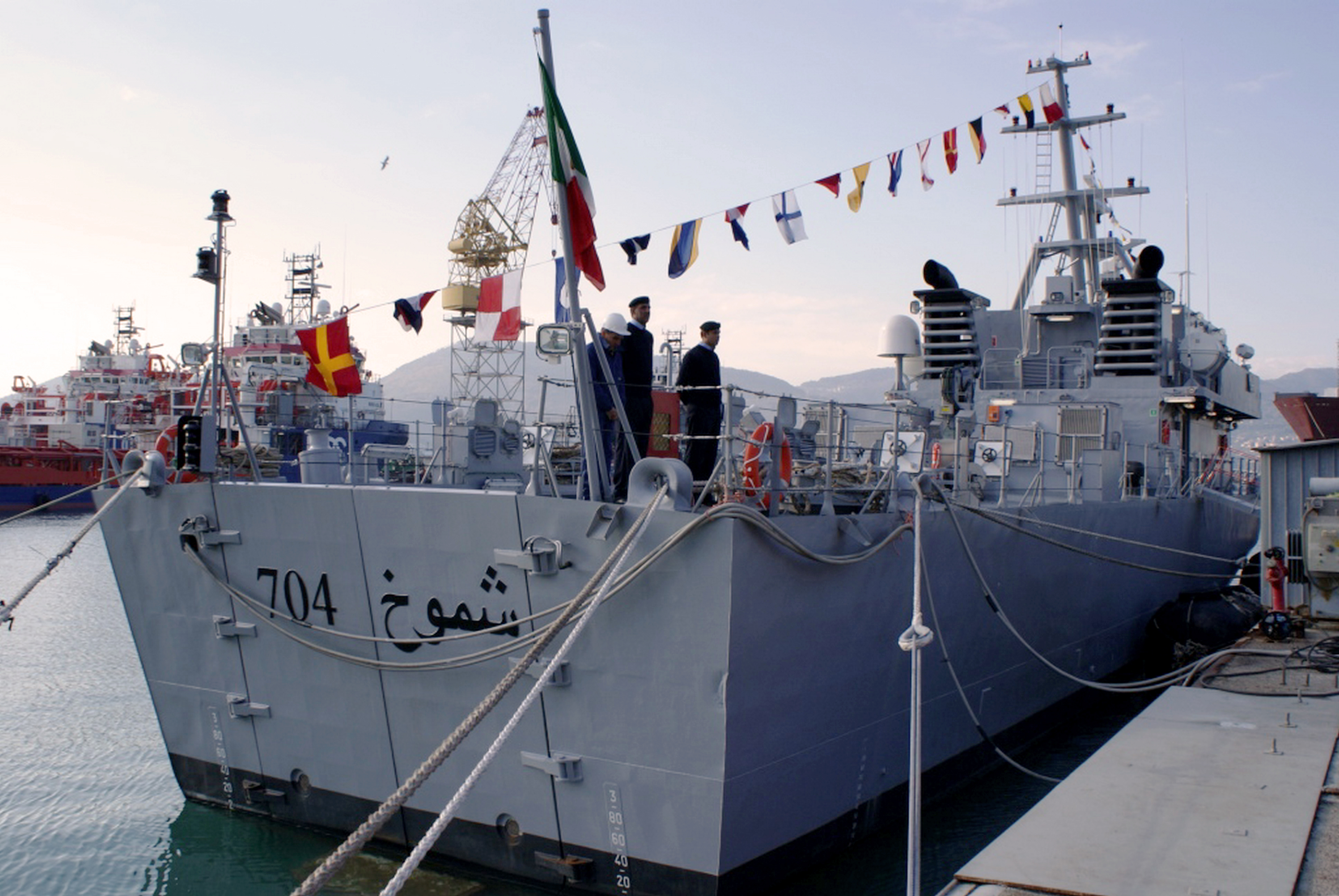
Patrol Boat Type Saettia

On 15 February 2005 the Iraqi Navy signed a $101 million contract with the Italian Government to provide four Saettia MK4 class Offshore-Patrol Vessels.

This is a modified Diciotti class offshore patrol boat, as originally used by the Guardia Costiera. The vessels are to be built by Fincantieri at Riva Trigoso, with modifications including increased crew capacity of 38. The contract also comprises the provision of logistical support and crew training with each crew completing a 7-week training course. In cooperation with the Marina Militare (Italian Navy), each commissioning crew is provided with a week's bridge simulator course at the Academy in Livorno.

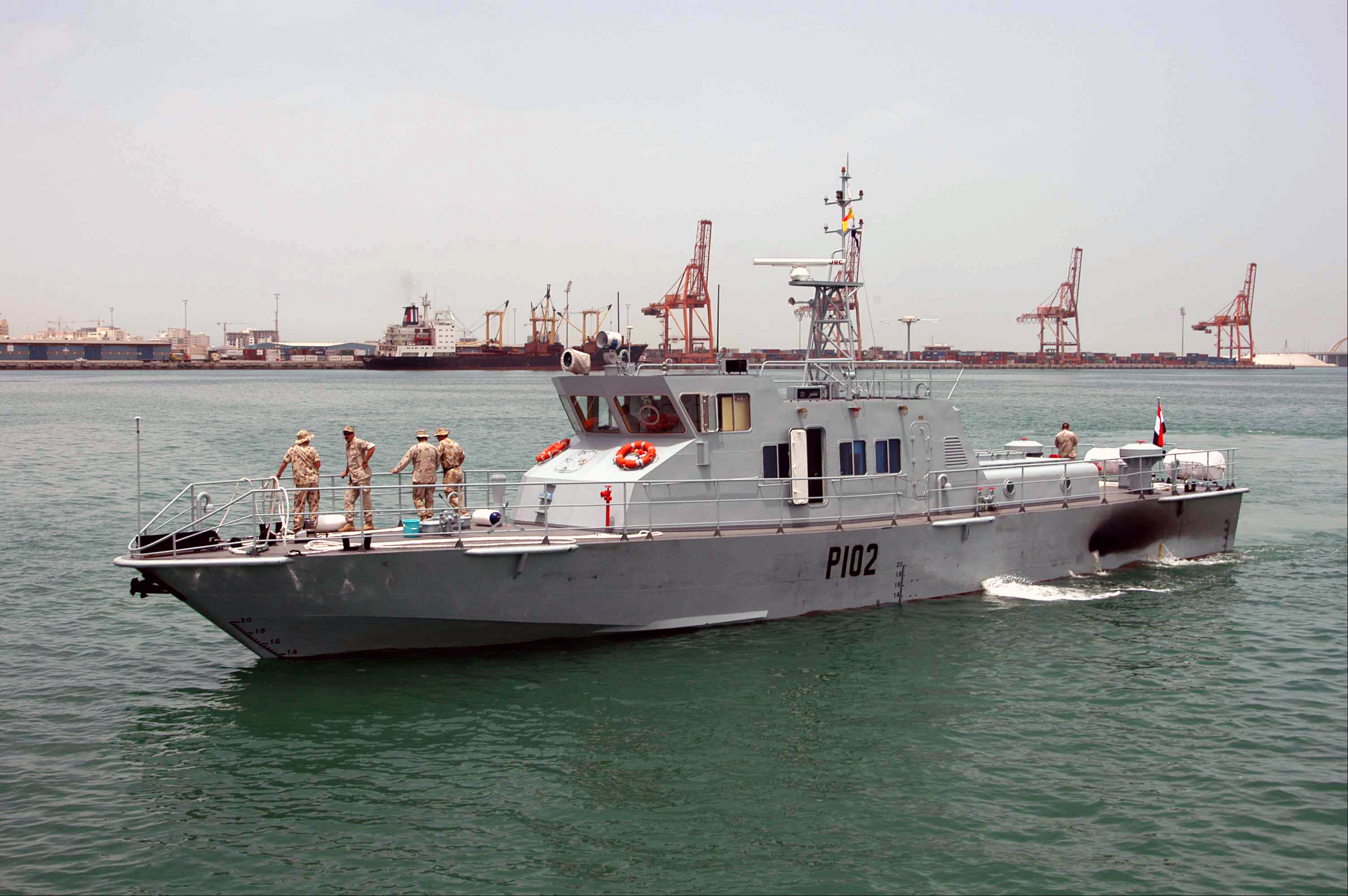
An Iraqi patrol craft in Manama, Bahrain prior to being delivered to the Iraqi Navy

In May 2009, the first vessel, Patrol Ship 701 named Fatah (Arabic for Opening), was handed over at the Muggiano, La Spezia shipyard. The crew had been training since January 2009, and would now be heading for Umm Qasr, a 20-day/5,000 nautical miles journey via the Mediterranean, Suez Canal and Red Sea. There, additional training will be completed, before the vessel takes over duties from the British Royal Marine patrols, who will then revert to a training role of new crew. The vessels will be used to patrol the exclusive economic zone, control maritime traffic, for search and rescue and fire fighting.

=== Al Basra class OSV ===
- 2 × Al Basra-class offshore support vessel
  - 401 Al Basra
  - 402 Al Fayhaa

=== Offshore patrol vessels ===
The fifteen (15) 35-meter Patrol Vessels (P301 – P315) were built by Swiftships in the period 2011–2014. The ships will provide logistical support for securing oil platforms to the Interceptor boats and more than 60 Fast Attack boats.

=== Predator class ===
The five 27-meter Predator (NHS615) Class patrol boats: (P-101), (P-102), (P-103), (P-104), (P-105); were built by Wuhan Nanhua High-speed Ship Engineering Co., Ltd. and delivered in 2002, they were to be the new ICDF's first ships and were to be purchased under the oil-for-food program. Due to their military compatibilities they were not allowed to enter Iraq until 2003. The vessel has one(1) continuous freeboard main deck with camber and slight fore sheer, one deck house and wheelhouse. The hull below main deck is divided by transversal bulkheads into 4 spaces. The speed of the vessel under sea trial conditions is 32 knots. Crew: 14.

=== Supply vessels ===
- 1 offshore supply vessel
  - Al Shams (Sun): September 2006, an Iraqi marine company will deliver a new ship (Al Shams or the Sun) which was bought from Iraqi aquatic transportation company to be employed as guiding afloat station across the sea in order. In March 2010, the Iraqi Navy awarded a US$70 million contract through FMS to RiverHawk Fast Sea Frames, LLC, Tampa, Florida for two 60-metre offshore support vessels. The two vessels were delivered on 20 December 2012.

=== List of ships ===
Class	Names / pennant number	Type	Photo	Number of Ships	Notes
Corvette
Assad-class corvette	Tariq ibn Ziyad (F212)	corvette		1	
Offshore patrol vessel
Saettia Mk4/Fattah-class	Fateh (PS 701) el-Naser (PS 702); Majid (PS 703); Shmookh (PS 704)	Offshore patrol vessel		4	
Offshore support vessel
Al Basra-class	Al Basra (OSV 401); Al Fayhaa (OSV 402)	Offshore support vessel		2	
Fast attack craft
Swiftships Model 35PB1208 E-1455	(P-301) (P-302) (P-303) (P-304) (P-305) (P-306) (P-307) (P-308) (P-309) (P-310) (P-311) (P-312) (P-313) (P-314) (P-315)	fast attack craft		15	
Predator class	(P-101) (P-102) (P-103) (P-104) (P-105)	fast attack craft		5	
Fast aluminum boats
Fast Aluminum Boats		Patrol boat		24	
Rigid-hulled inflatable boats
Rigid-hulled inflatable boat		RHIB		10	
Supply vessel
Al Shams-class	Al Shams	Supply vessel		1	

== Future procurement ==
In 2011, it was reported that the Navy would purchase Boeing ScanEagle UAVs to carry out reconnaissance. Exact numbers and delivery dates were still unknown as of January 2012.
