= List of decommissioned ships of the Italian Navy =

This is a list of decommissioned vessels of the Italian Navy since 1949.

== Submarines ==
Class	Picture	Shipyard Origin	Ships	Launched	Commissioned	Retired	Displacement (ton)	Length (m)	Speed (kn)	Note
Submarines
Sauro		Fincantieri Spa – Monfalcone (Gorizia) (Italy)	Leonardo da Vinci (S 520) II Batch Guglielmo Marconi (S 521) II Batch Carlo Fecia di Cossato (S 519) I Batch Nazario Sauro (S 518) I Batch	20 October 1980 20 September 1980 16 November 1977 9.10.1976	23 October 1981 11.9.1982 5.11.1979 12.2.1980	30 June 2010 1.10.2003 1.4.2005 1.5.2002	1,641	63,85	19	Nazario Sauro (S 518) preserved to Galata - Museo del mare, Genoa
Toti		Italcantieri Spa – Monfalcone (Gorizia) (Italy)	Attilio Bagnolini (S 505) Enrico Toti (S 506) Enrico Dandolo (S 513) Lazzaro Mocenigo (S 514)	26 August 1967 12.3.1967 16 December 1967 20 April 1968	16 June 1968 22 January 1968 29 September 1968 28 December 1968	5.7.1991 30 September 1997 30 September 1996 15 October 1993	591	46	14	Enrico Toti (S 506) preserved to Museo Nazionale Scienza e Tecnologia Leonardo da Vinci Enrico Dandolo (S 513) preserved to Museo Storico Navale
Piomarta (Ex-US Tang class)		Electric Boat - Groton Connecticut United States	Livio Piomarta (S 515) Romeo Romei (S 516)	14 June 1951 3.12.1951	10 July 1973 22 February 1974	28 February 1986 31 May 1988	2,700 2,743	87,4	18,3	ex USS Trigger (SS-564) ex USS Harder (SS-568)
Gazzana Priaroggia (Ex-US Tench class)		Boston Naval Shipyard Boston Massachusetts United States; Portsmouth Naval Shipyard Kittery Maine United States	Primo Longobardo (S 501) Gianfranco Gazzana Priaroggia (S 502)	15 December 1944 21 May 1948	18 August 1972 18 August 1972	31 January 1980 31 May 1981	2,480	93,6	20	ex USS Pickerel (SS-524) ex USS Volador (SS-490)
Torricelli (Ex-US Balao class)		Electric Boat - Groton Connecticut United States; Manitowoc Shipbuilding Company – Wisconsin United States	Alfredo Cappellini (S 507) Evangelista Torricelli (S 512) Francesco Morosini (S 508)	2 December 1943 14 March 1944 27 February 1944	5 March 1966 9.1.1960 31 March 1966	1 November 1977 30 September 1976 30 November 1973	2,424 2,466 2,460	93.6 95 93,6	20 18 20	ex USS Capitaine (SS-336) ex USS Lizardfish (SS-373) ex USS Besugo (SS-321)
Tazzoli (Ex-US Gato class)		Electric Boat - Groton Connecticut United States	Enrico Tazzoli (S 511) Leonardo da Vinci (S 510)	2 April 1942 25 April 1943	13 December 1954 31 January 1955	28 February 1973 1.5.1973	2,463	93,2	20	ex USS Barb (SS-220) ex USS Dace (SS-247)
Flutto		CRDA Cantieri Riuniti dell'Adriatico – Monfalcone (Gorizia); Cantieri Navali Tosi – Taranto (Italy)	Vortice (S 502) Pietro Calvi (S 503)	23 February 1943 21 June 1959	21 June 1943 16 December 1961	1 August 1967 1971	1,095 1,107	63,13 65,9	15 14	ex PV-1 ex Bario
Acciaio		CRDA Cantieri Riuniti dell'Adriatico – Monfalcone (Gorizia) (Italy)	Giada (S 501)	10 June 1941	8 December 1941	1 June 1966	865	60,18	14	ex PV-2
DSRV
		Cantieri Navali Breda - Porto Marghera (Venice) (Italy)	USEL/MSM-1S		1977	2000 ?	13,2			Operated by ITS Anteo (A5309); Maximum operating depth: 300 m Capacity: 10 rescuees Replaced by SRV-300 and stored at La Spezia Naval Base

== Aircraft Carrier ==
Class	Picture	Shipyard Origin	Ships	Launched	Commissioned	Retired	Displacement (ton)	Length (m)	Speed (kn)	Note
Aircraft Carriers
Giuseppe Garibaldi		Monfalcone shipyards, Fincantieri Gorizia	1	11 June 1983	30 September 1985	1 October 2025	14,150	180.2	30	

== Battleships ==
Class	Picture	Shipyard Origin	Ships	Launched	Commissioned	Retired	Displacement (ton)	Length (m)	Speed (kn)	Note
Battleships
Andrea Doria		Arsenale Militare Marittimo; La Spezia; Cantiere Navale San Marco; Trieste (Italy); Regio Cantiere di Castellammare di Stabia; Naples (Italy)	Andrea Doria (B 51) Duilio (B 50)	30 March 1913 24 April 1913	13 March 1916 10.5.1915	16 September 1956 15 September 1956	25,200 29,000	186,9	27	Andrea Doria was used as a gunnery training ship, after May 1953

== Cruisers ==
Class	Picture	Shipyard Origin	Ships	Launched	Commissioned	Retired	Displacement (ton)	Length (m)	Speed (kn)	Note
guided missile cruisers
Vittorio Veneto		Italcantieri Spa; Castellammare di Stabia (Naples) (Italy)	Vittorio Veneto	5 February 1967	12 July 1969	29 June 2006	8,850	179,6	30	
Andrea Doria		Cantieri del Tirreno; Riva Trigoso (Genoa) (Italy); Navalmeccanica; Castellammare di Stabia (Naples) (Italy)	Andrea Doria Caio Duilio	27 February 1963 22 December 1962	23 February 1964 30 November 1964	30 September 1992 15 November 1989	6,500	149,2	30	Converted into training ship in 1980
Condottieri (Luigi di Savoia Duca degli Abruzzi)		CRDA Cantieri Riuniti dell'Adriatico; Monfalcone (Gorizia) (Italy); Arsenale Militare Marittimo; La Spezia (Italy)	Giuseppe Garibaldi	21 April 1936 / 1961	1 December 1937 / 1961	1971	11,350	187	30	Converted into a guided missile cruiser by 1961 Fitted with 4 launch tubes for UGM-27 Polaris SLBM missiles
light cruisers
Condottieri		Cantiere Navale OTO; Livorno (Italy)	Luigi di Savoia Duca degli Abruzzi	21 April 1936	1 December 1937	1.1961	11,735	187	34	Refitted in 1953
Condottieri		Cantiere Navale Ansaldo; Genoa (Italy)	Raimondo Montecuccoli	2 August 1934	30 June 1935	1 June 1964	8,994	182,2	37	refitted in 1949 to serve as training cruiser
Alberto di Giussano		CRDA Cantieri Riuniti dell'Adriatico; Trieste (Italy)	Luigi Cadorna	30 September 1931	11 August 1933	5.1951	7,113	169,3	37	

== Destroyers ==
Class	Picture	Shipyard Origin	Ships	Launched	Commissioned	Retired	Displacement (ton)	Length (m)	Speed (kn)	Note
guided missile destroyers
Audace		Cantieri Navali Riuniti; Riva Trigoso (Genoa) (Italy) Italcantieri Spa; Castellammare di Stabia (Naples) (Italy)	Audace (D 551) Ardito (D 550)	2 October 1971 27 November 1971	16 November 1972 5.12.1972	28 September 2006 28 September 2006	4,554	140,7	33	
Impavido		Cantieri Navali Riuniti; Riva Trigoso (Genoa) (Italy) Cantiere Navale Ansaldo; Genoa (Italy)	Impavido (D 570) Intrepido (D 571)	25 May 1962 21 October 1962	16 November 1963 28 July 1964	15 July 1992 1991	3,941	130,9	34	
destroyers
Fante (Ex-US Fletcher class)		Bath Iron Works (United States) Seattle-Tacoma Shipbuilding Corporation (United States) Bath Iron Works (United States)	Fante (D 561) Geniere (D 555) Lanciere (D 560)	31 August 1942 20 July 1942 28 August 1941	2 July 1969 17 January 1970 2.07.1969	1977 1975 1.971	2,050	114,7	35	ex USS Walker (DD-517) ex USS Prichett (DD-561) ex USS Taylor (DD-468); She was cannibalized to maintain her sister ships still serving
Indomito		CNR Cantieri Navali Riuniti; Riva Trigoso (Genoa) (Italy) Ansaldo S.p.A. - Stabilimento Luigi Orlando; Livorno (Italy)	Impetuoso (D 558) Indomito (D 559)	16 September 1956 7.8.1955	25 January 1958 23 February 1958	1983 1980	3,810	127,6	34	
San Giorgio (Ex Regia Marina Capitani Romani class)		CNR Cantieri Navali Riuniti Ancona (Italy) Navalmeccanica - Cantiere Navale di Castellammare di Stabia; Naples (Italy)	San; Giorgio (D 562) San; Marco (D 563)	24 August 1941 20 July 1941	1955 1956	1980 1971	5,420	142,2	36	ex Pompeo Magno; Converted between 1951/1955; Refitted as cadet training ship between 1963/1965 ex Giulio Germanico converted between 1950/1956
Artigliere (Ex-US Benson and Gleaves classes		Bethlehem Shipbuilding Corporation; San Francisco; California (United States) Boston Navy Yard (United States)	Artigliere (D 553) Aviere (D 554)	30 April 1941 1.11.1939	11 June 1951 15 January 1951	1.1971 1975	2,619 2,520	105,99 106,17	37,6 35	ex USS Woodworth (DD-460) later refitted as training ship ex USS Nicholson (DD-442); Since 1970 refitted as experimental ship and coded A 5302

== Frigates ==
Class	Picture	Shipyard Origin	Ships	Launched	Commissioned	Retired	Displacement (ton)	Length (m)	Speed (kn)	Note
guided missile frigates
Soldati		Italcantieri Spa - CNR Cantieri Navali Riuniti; Ancona (Italy) Fincantieri; Riva Trigoso (Italy)	Artigliere (F 582) Aviere (F 583) Bersagliere (F 584) Granatiere (F 585)	27 July 1983 19 December 1984 18 April 1985 1.06.1985	29 October 1994 4.01.1995 8.11.1995 20 March 1996	29 September 2013 2.10.2019 17 April 2018 30 September 2015	2,506	113,2	35	Built for Iraqi Navy as Hittin F-14 but never delivered Built for Iraqi Navy as Thi Qar but never delivered Built for Iraqi Navy as Al Yarmouk but never delivered Built for Iraqi Navy as Al Qadisiya but never delivered
Lupo		Italcantieri Spa - Cantieri Navali del Tirreno; Riva Trigoso (Genoa) (Italy)	Lupo (F 564) Sagittario (F 565) Perseo (F 566) Orsa (F 567)	29 July 1976 22 June 1977 8.7.1978 1.3.1979	20 September 1977 18 November 1978 1.03.1980 1.03.1980	2003 2005 2005 2002	2,525	113,55	35	Transferred 3 November 2004 to Peruvian Navy as BAP Palacios (FM-56) Transferred 23 January 2006 to Peruvian Navy as BAP Quiñónes (FM-58) Transferred 23 January 2006 to Peruvian Navy as BAP Bolognesi (FM-57) Transferred 3 November 2004 to Peruvian Navy as BAP Aguirre (FM-55)
Anti-submarine frigates
Alpino		Cantieri Navali del Tirreno; Riva Trigoso (Genoa) (Italy)	Alpino (F 580) Carabiniere (F 581)	14 June 1967 30 September 1967	14 January 1968 28 April 1968	31 March 2006 19 November 2008	2,689	113,3	29	Converted to minehunter support ship as A5384 in the late 1990s Converted to experimental ship in 1993-1994
Bergamini		CRDA Cantieri Riuniti dell'Adriatico; Monfalcone (Gorizia) (Italy) Navalmeccanica; Castellammare di Stabia (Naples) (Italy)	Luigi Rizzo (F 596) Carlo Margottini (F 595) Virginio Fasan (F 594) Carlo Bergamini (F 593)	6 March 1960 12.06.1960 09.10.1960 16 June 1960	15 December 1961 5 May 1962 10 October 1962 23 June 1962	30 November 1980 31 May 1988 7.12.1988 11.1981	1,650	94	26	
Centauro		Cantiere Ansaldo; Livorno (Italy); Cantieri Navali Tosi; Taranto (Italy)	Canopo (F 551) Castore (F 553) Centauro (F 554) Cigno (F 555)	20 February 1955 08.07.1956 4 April 1954 14 March 1955	4 May 1958 14 July 1957 4 April 1957 7.3.1957	30 September 1982 1 January 1983 31 May 1985 31 October 1983	2,184	103,1	26	Launched as D-570; Since 10 April 1957 classified as a frigate Launched as D-571; Entered service as a frigate Launched as D-572; Since 10 April 1957 classified as a frigate Launched as D-573; Since 10 April 1957 classified as a frigate Cigno and Castore financed by U.S.A. with Mutual Defence Assistance Program as DE 1020 and DE 1031 than assigned to Italy

== Corvettes ==
Class	Picture	Shipyard Origin	Ships	Launched	Commissioned	Retired	Displacement (ton)	Length (m)	Sped (kn)	Note
Corvettes
Minerva		Fincantieri Spa - Cantieri Navali; Riva Trigoso (Genoa) (Italy) Fincantieri Spa - Cantiere Navale del Muggiano (La Spezia) (Italy)	Minerva (F 551) Urania (F 552) Danaide (F 553) Sfinge (F 554) Driade (F 555) Chimera (F 556) Fenice (F 557) Sibilla (F 558)	3 April 1986 21 June 1986 18 October 1986 16 May 1987 11.03.1989 7.04.1990 9 September 1989 15 September 1990	10 June 1987 1.06.1987 9 September 1987 13 February 1988 19 April 1990 15 January 1991 11.09.1990 16 May 1991	14 May 2015 10.03.2016 10.03.2016 29 May 2017 25 September 2019 25 September 2019 29 May 2017 14 May 2015	1,285	87	24	
Aldebaran (Ex US Cannon class		Federal Shipbuilding and Drydock Company; Newark, New Jersey (United States) Tampa Shipbuilding Company, Tampa, Florida (United States)	Aldebaran (F 590) Altair (F 591) Andromeda (F 592)	30 December 1943 12 December 1943 17 October 1943	10 January 1951 10.1.1951 10.1.1951	1976 1971 1.1972	1,796	93	21	ex USS Thornhill (DE-195) initially classified as destroyer escort AD since 1957 coded as frigate then corvette ex USS Gandy (DE-764) initially classified as destroyer escort AT since 1957 coded as frigate then corvette ex USS Wesson (DE-184) initially classified as destroyer escort AN since 1957 coded as frigate then corvette
Spica (Climene batch)		Cantieri del Tirreno; Riva Trigoso (Genoa) (Italy)	Cassiopea (F 553)	1936	26 April 1937	1959	1,010	83,5	34	Commissioned as Torpedo boats between 1950 and 1952 became fast Corvettes since 1953 coded as F
Spica (Alcione batch)		Cantieri del Quarnaro; Fiume (Italy); Cantiere Navale Ansaldo; Sestri Ponente; Genoa (Italy)	Libra (F 552) Aretusa (F 556) Clio (F 555) Calliope (F 551)	3 October 1937 6.02.1938 3.04.1938 16 April 1938	19 January 1938 1.07.1938 2.10.1938 28 October 1938	1 April 1964 1.08.1958 1959 1.8.1958	1,050	81,42	34	Commissioned as Torpedo boats between 1950 and 1952 became fast Corvettes since 1953 coded as F
Spica (Perseo batch)		Cantieri del Quarnaro; Fiume (Italy)	Sirio (F 554) Sagittario (F 557)	14 November 1935 21 June 1936	1 March 1936 8.10.1936	1959 1964	1,020	81,9	34	Commissioned as Torpedo boats between 1950 and 1952 became fast Corvettes since 1953 coded as F
Anti-submarine Corvettes
Pietro de Cristofaro		Cantieri Navali del Tirreno; Riva Trigoso; Genoa (Italy); Cantiere Navale Ansaldo; Sestri Ponente; Genoa (Italy); CRDA Cantieri Riuniti dell'Adriatico; Monfalcone; Gorizia (Italy)	Pietro de Cristofaro (F 540) Salvatore Todaro (F 550) Umberto Grosso (F 541) Licio Visintini (F 546)	29 May 1965 1964 1964 1965	1965 1966 1966 1966	1994 1994 1994 1994	994	80,2	23	
Albatros		Navalmeccanica Spa; Castellammare di Stabia; Naples (Italy); Cantiere Navale Ernesto Breda; Marghera; Venice (Italy)	Albatros (F 543) Alcione (F 544) Airone (F 545) Aquila (F 542)	18 July 1954 19 September 1954 21 November 1954 31 July 1954	1 June 1955 23 October 1955 29 December 1955 18 October 1961	30 April 1989 1991 1991 1991	950	69,5	19	Financed by United States on MDAP program as PC-1619 Financed by USA on MDAP program as PC-1620 Financed by United States on MDAP program as PC-1621 Financed by USA on MDAP program as PC-1626 launched as HNLMS Lynx (F923) for Netherlands Navy
Le Fougueux (P.C. 1610) on PC-461 plans		Anciens Chantiers Dubigeon; Brest (France) on U.S.A. plans (United States)	Vedetta (F 597)	30 September 1954	5 November 1959	1 May 1978	450	53	18,7	Financed by United States with MDAP program Launched in France; Delivery 23 August 1955 to Germany Navy; Delivery 2 January 1957 to Ethiopian Navy as Zerai Deres; Returned in summer 1957 to USA, as U.S.S. P.C. 1616
Gabbiano		Cantieri Navali Cerusa; Voltri (Genoa) (Italy); Cantiere Navale Ansaldo; Sestri Ponente (Genoa) (Italy)	Gabbiano (F 571) Cormorano (F 575) Pellicano (F 574) Folaga (F 576) Gru (F 566) Ibis (F 561)	23 June 1942 17 November 1942 20 February 1943 13 November 1942 23 December 1942 12 December 1942	3 October 1942 6.03.1943 15 April 1943 16 February 1943 29 April 1943 3.04.1943	1 November 1971 1.11.1971 1 January 1969 1.08.1965 1.08.1971 1.07.1971	740	64,4	18,5	
Gabbiano (Ape batch)		Navalmeccanica Spa; Castellammare di Stabia (Naples) (Italy)	Crisalide (F 547) Farfalla (F 548)	8 December 1947 4.01.1948	25 September 1952 10.2.1953	1 December 1972 31 December 1971	740	64,4	18,5	Farfalla fitted to operate the RPV Meteor P1 in the 1960s
Gabbiano (Artemide batch)		CRDA Cantieri San Marco (Trieste) (Italy); CRDA Cantieri Riuniti dell'Adriatico; Monfalcone (Gorizia) (Italy)	Pomona (F 573) Driade (F 568) Danaide (F 563) Minerva (F 562) Flora (F 572) Sibilla (F 565) Urania (F 570) Chimera (F 569) Sfinge (F 579) Fenice (F 577)	18 November 1942 7.10.1942 21 October 1942 6.11.1942 1.12.1942 10.03.1943 21 April 1943 30 January 1943 9.01.1943 10.03.1943	4 April 1943 14 January 1943 27 February 1943 25 February 1943 25 April 1943 5.6.1943 7.8.1943 26 May 1943 12.5.1943 15 June 1943	1 June 1965 1.7.1966 1 January 1968 1.7.1969 1 January 1970 1.02.1973 17 July 1971 1.05.1977 15 June 1977 1.07.1965	740	64,4	18,5	Sibilla fitted to operate the RPV Meteor P1 in the 1960s
Gabbiano (Scimitarra batch)		Cantiere Navale Ernesto Breda; Marghera (Venice) (Italy)	Baionetta (F 578) Scimitarra (F 564) Bombarda (F 549)	5 October 1942 16 September 1942 10.02.1944	28 July 1943 10.05.1943 21 April 1951	1 October 1971 1.06.1971 1.11.1978	740	64,4	18,5	
Alabarda (Ex-Royal Navy Algerine class)		Lobnitz & Company; Renfrew (United Kingdom)	Alabarda (F 560)	2 September 1943	1950	1968	1,250	68,6	16	ex Royal Navy HMS Larne
Antilope (Ex-German M1940 class		Oderwerke AG; Stettin (Germany); Schichau; Königsberg (Germany)	Antilope (F 540) Daino (F 542) Gazzella (F 541)	12 June 1943 19 October 1944 9 September 1944	1949 1949 1949	1958 1966 1966	775	62,3	16	ex Kriegsmarine German minesweeper M328;commissioned as B1 ex Kriegsmarine German minesweeper M803;commissioned as B2 in 1960 converted to survey ship (A 5308) ex Kriegsmarine German minesweeper M801;commissioned as B3 converted to training ship in 1960

== Torpedo boats ==
Class	Picture	Shipyard Origin	Ships	Launched	Commissioned	Retired	Displacement (ton)	Length (m)	Speed (kn)	Note
Torpedo boats
MS 472 (CRDA 60t)		CRDA; Cantieri Riuniti dell'Adriatico; Monfalcone (Gorizia) (Italy)	MS 471 MS 472 MS 473 MS 474 MS 475 MS 481 MS 482 MS 483 MS 484	31 January 1942 3.06.1942 9.06.1942 28 October 1942 15 May 1943 4.11.1942 11 November 1942 21 March 1943 18 March 1943	29 April 1942 24 June 1942 16 July 1942 24 March 1943 30 June 1943 23 March 1943 24 March 1943 24 May 1943 11.6.1943	1 May 1965 1974 1974 1979 31 December 1962 1979 1.3.1963 1962 1.3.1963	1st batch = 63 2nd batch = 68,8	28	1st batch = 32,5 2nd batch = 31	1st batch: ex MS 11 > 1 January 1949 as MV 611 > 1 November 1952 as MS 611 > 1 January 1954 as MS 471 1st batch: ex MS 24 > 1 January 1949 as MV 612 > 1 November 1952 as MS 612 > 1 January 1954 as MS 472; preserved to Marina di Ravenna 1st batch: ex MS 31 > 1 January 1949 as MV 613 > 1 November 1952 as MS 613 > 1 January 1954 as MS 473; preserved to Museo Storico Navale di Venezia 2nd batch: ex MS 54 > 1 January 1949 as MV 614 > 1 November 1952 as MS 614 > 1 January 1954 as MS 474 2nd batch: ex MS 74 > 1 January 1949 as MV 619 > 1 November 1952 as MS 619 > 1 January 1954 as MS 475 2nd batch: ex MS 55 > 1 January 1949 as MV 615 > 1 November 1952 as MS 615 > 1 January 1954 as MS 481 2nd batch: ex MS 56 > 1 January 1949 as MV 616 > 1 November 1952 as MS 616 > 1 January 1954 as MS 482 2nd batch: ex MS 72 > 1 January 1949 as MV 617 > 1 November 1952 as MS 617 > 1 January 1954 as MS 483; in 1964 converted to auxiliary vessel (for torpedo recovery) as MEN 204 2nd batch: ex MS 73 > 1 January 1949 as MV 618 > 1 November 1952 as MS 618 > 1 January 1954 as MS 484
Higgins; 78 foot		Higgins Industries; New Orleans; Louisiana (United States)	MS 441 MS 442 MS 443 MS 444 MS 451 MS 452 MS 453	21 November 1942 23 October 1942 28 October 1942 20 November 1942 16 October 1942 24 October 1942 31 December 1942	4 April 1948 4 April 1948 4 April 1948 1950 2.1947 2.1947 2.1947	31 October 1985 1.4.1972 31 October 1985 1985 12.3.1966 12.3.1966 1980	56	23,93	41	ex PT-92;delivered to Italy as GIS 0023, since 1 April 1951 as GIS-841, since 1 November 1952 as MS 841 and since 1 November 1954 as MS 441; in 1962/1963 converted as special forces tender (68 tonnes) ex PT-88; delivered to Italy as GIS 0021, since 1 April 1951 as GIS 842, since 1 November 1952 as MS 842 and since 1 November 1954 as MS 442; 12 March 1966 delivered to Guardia di Finanza as Brigadiere Giannotti;returned in 1969 ex PT-90; delivered to Italy as GIS 0022, since 1 April 1951 as GIS 843, since 1 November 1952 as MS 843 and since 1 November 1954 as MS 443; in 1962/1963 converted as special forces tender (68 tonnes) ex PT-94;delivered to Italy as GIS 0024, since 1 April 1951 as GIS 844, since 1 November 1952 as MS 844 and since 1 November 1954 as MS 444;since 1964 used as training vessel to La Maddalena ex PT-206; delivered to Italy as GIS 0025, since 1 April 1951 GIS 851, since 1 November 1952 as MS 851 and since 1 November 1954 as MS 451; 12 March 1966 delivered to Guardia di Finanza as Tenente Lombardo; returned in 1969 ex PT-210; delivered to Italy as GIS 0026 > MS 852 > MS 452; 12 March 1966 delivered to Guardia di Finanza as Finanziere Feliciani; returned in 1974 ex PT-215; delivered to Italy as GIS 0027, since 1 April 1951 GIS 853, since 1 November 1952 MS 853, since 1 November 1954 as MS 453; converted as special forces tender (68 tonnes)
Vosper; 70 foot		Vosper & Company; Portsmouth; England (United Kingdom)	MS 421 MS 422 MS 423 MS 424 MS 431 MS 432 MS 433 MS 434 MS 454 MS 461 MS 462 MS 463 MS 464	17 July 1943 9.03.1944 7.08.1944 1.09.1944 13 June 1944 19 May 1944 22 August 1944 28 July 1944 15 October 1943 17 December 1943 14 January 1944 13 April 1944 22 January 1940	4 April 1948 4 April 1948 4 April 1948 21 July 1948 4 April 1948 4 April 1948 4 April 1948 4 April 1948 1951 24 March 1948 1.2.1948 1.2.1948 1.2.1948	1958 30 September 1960 31 December 1958 30 June 1959 31 October 1961 31 December 1961 31 December 1958 30 June 1959 31 December 1958 30 June 1959 30 April 1960 30 April 1960 30 May 1959	53	21,7	38/40	ex USS BPT-68 delivered to Italy as GIS-0017 > 1 April 1951 as GIS 821 > 1 November 1952 as MS 841 > 1 January 1954 as MS 421 ex PT-392 delivered to Italy as GIS-0013 > 1 April 1951 as GIS 822 > 1 November 1952 as MS 822 > 1 January 1954 as MS 422 ex PT-397 delivered to Italy as GIS-0008 > 1 April 1951 as GIS 823 > 1 November 1952 as MS 823 > 1 January 1954 as MS 423 ex PT-399 delivered to Italy as GIS-0028 > 1 April 1951 as GIS 824 > 1 November 1952 as MS 824 > 1 January 1954 as MS 424 ex PT-393 delivered to Italy as GIS-0005 > 1 April 1951 as GIS 831 > 1 November 1952 as MS 831 > 1 January 1954 as MS 431 ex PT-394 delivered to Italy as GIS-0006 > 1 April 1951 as GIS 832 > 1 November 1952 as MS 832 > 1 January 1954 as MS 432 ex PT-398 delivered to Italy as GIS-0007 > 1 April 1951 as GIS 833 > 1 November 1952 as MS 833 > 1 January 1954 as MS 433 ex PT-396 delivered to Italy as GIS-0011 > 1 April 1951 as GIS 834 > 1 November 1952 as MS 834 > 1 January 1954 as MS 434 ex PT-386 delivered to Italy as GIS-0012 > 1 April 1951 as GIS 854 > 1 November 1952 as MS 854 > 1 January 1954 as MS 454 ex PT-388 delivered to Italy as GIS-0001 > 1 April 1951 as GIS 811 > 1 November 1952 as MS 811 > 1 January 1954 as MS 461 ex PT-389 delivered to Italy as GIS-0002 > 1 April 1951 as GIS 812 > 1 November 1952 as MS 812 > 1 January 1954 as MS 462 ex PT-391 delivered to Italy as GIS-0003 > 1 April 1951 as GIS 813 > 1 November 1952 as MS 813 > 1 January 1954 as MS 463 ex PT-390 delivered to Italy as GIS-0004 > 1 April 1951 as GIS 814 > 1 November 1952 as MS 814 > 1 January 1954 as MS 464
Elco; 77 foot		Electric Launch Company; Bayonne; New Jersey (United States)	GIS 0019 GIS 0020	26 August 1941 30 September 1941	2.1947 2.1947	1948 ? 1948 ?	40	23	41	ex PT-49 delivered to Italian Air Force as MA 1053 in airport-SAR role ex PT-57 delivered to Italian Air Force as MA 1056 in airport-SAR role

== Gunboats ==
Class	Picture	Shipyard Origin	Ships	Launched	Commissioned	Retired	Displacement (ton)	Length (m)	Speed (kn)	Note
Gunboats
MC 493; Freccia		Cantieri del Tirreno; Riva Trigoso (Genova) (Italy); CRDA Cantieri Riuniti dell'Adriatico; Monfalcone (Gorizia) (Italy)	P 493; Freccia P 494; Saetta	9 January 1965 11.04.1965	6 July 1965 25 April 1966	15 September 1984 15 May 1986	200	45,6	39	ex MC 590 > 1 September 1965 as P 493 Freccia Laid down as MC 591;launched as P 494 Saetta; since 1966 embarked Nettuno/Sea Killer AsuW missile system
MC 491; Lampo		Arsenale Militare Marittimo; Taranto (Italy)	P 491; Lampo P 492; Baleno	22 November 1960 10.06.1964	27 April 1963 16 July 1965	15 April 1985 31 May 1985	190	41,4	39	ex MC 491 > 1 September 1965 as P 491 Lampo ex MC 492 > 1 September 1965 as P 492 Baleno
P 490; Folgore		CRDA Cantieri Riuniti dell'Adriatico; Monfalcone (Gorizia) (Italy)	P 490; Folgore	21 January 1954	1 August 1955	15 October 1976	190	39,4	35	ex MC 490 > 1 September 1965 P 490 Folgore
Fulmine		CRDA Cantieri Riuniti dell'Adriatico; Monfalcone (Gorizia) (Italy)	P 499; Fulmine	13 November 1955	20 September 1956	1 May 1970	344	49,7	30	Ordered as VAS 470; Laid down 21 January 1954 as P 470 Sentinella; Launched as P 499 Sentinella; Recoded 29 September 1956 as F 598 Sentinella; Refitted between 1960/1965, since 1 May 1965 classified Gunboat since 1 September 1965 P 499 Fulmine used for testing first OTO Melara 76/62 mm gun, Compatto type
Schnellboot; Lűrssen S 38		Lürssen; Schlichting (Germany)	MC 485	23 October 1941	2.1952	1 April 1966	124	34,94	39	ex S-67; ex Torus; in 1952 classified MV 621 > 1 November 1952 as MS 621 > 1 January 1954 as MS 485 > 10 September 1954 as MC 485
Support gunboats
LCS(L)(3) (Alano)		Commercial Iron Works; Portland; Oregon (United States); George Lawley & Son; Neponset; Massachusetts (United States)	Alano (L 9851) Bracco (L 9852) Mastino (L 9853) Molosso (L9854) Segugio (L 9855) Spinone (L 9856)	16 September 1944 1.10.1944 23 October 1944 2.11.1944 7.11.1944 6.11.1944	25 July 1951 25 July 1951 25 July 1951 25 July 1951 25 July 1951 25 July 1951	1 August 1971 31 July 1974 31 July 1974 31 July 1974 31 July 1974 31 July 1974	387	48,3	16,5	ex USS LCS(L)(3)-34 ex USS LCS(L)(3)-38 ex USS LCS(L)(3)-62 ex USS LCS(L)(3)-63 ex USS LCS(L)(3)-64 ex USS LCS(L)(3)-118

== Hydrofoil missile boats ==
Class	Picture	Shipyard Origin	Ships	Launched	Commissioned	Retired	Displacement (ton)	Length (m)	Speed (kn)	Note
hydrofoil missile boats
Sparviero		Fincantieri Spa; Riva Trigoso (Genova) and Muggiano (La Spezia) (Italy)	Sparviero (P 420) Nibbio (P 421) Falcone (P 422) Astore (P 423) Grifone (P 424) Gheppio (P 425) Condor (P 426)	9 May 1973 29 February 1980 27 October 1980 20 July 1981 1.12.1981 24 June 1982 25 January 1983	15 July 1974 7.3.1980 7.3.1982 5.2.1983 5.2.1983 20 September 1983 7.4.1984	30 September 1991 1.2.1998 1.8.2005 1.8.2005 1.8.2005 1.8.2005 1.8.2005	60,6 62,5	22,95	50	

== Minesweeper ==
Class	Picture	Ships	Displacement Tonnes	Commissioned	Retired	Note
MSO - Oceanic Minesweepers
Salmone (United States)		Salmone (A 5430) Storione (M 5431) Sgombro (M 5432) Squalo (M 5433)	750	23 February 1956 23 February 1956 12.3.1957 20 June 1957	1990 1.3.1997 3.10.2000 3.10.2000	Salmone launched 19 February 1955 as MSO-507 Storione launched 13 November 1954 as MSO-506 Launched 21 June 1956 as MSO-517; by 1991 classified as P-5432 Launched 3 December 1956 as MSO-518; by 1991 classified as P-5433
MSC - Coastal Minesweepers
Adjutant (Mandorlo) (United States)		Mandorlo (M 5519)	411	16 December 1960	30 November 1993	Launched 29 October 1959 as USS MSC-280, built for Italy; Initially named "Salice (M 5518)"; In 1975 first Italian vessel converted to minehunter
Adjutant (Legni, Abete batch) (United States)		Abete (M 5501) Acacia (M 5502) Betulla (M 5503) Castagno(M5504) Cedro (M 5505) Ciliegio (M 5506) Faggio (M 5507) Frassino (M 5508) Gelso (M 5509) Larice (M 5510) Noce (M 5511) Olmo (M 5512) Ontano (M 5513) Pino (M 5514) Pioppo (M 5515) Platano (M 5516) Quercia (M 5517)	405	1953 1953 6.7.1953 2 February 1954 26 October 1954 4.8.1953 15 September 1953 23 October 1953 29 December 1953 1953 6.5.1954 30 March 1954 1954 13 May 1954 30 June 1954 9 September 1954 4.11.1954	1977 1974 1974 10 October 1995 1995 1974 1980 1996 10 October 1995 1988 1983 1983 1980 1980 1999 29 September 1995 1981	Abete Launched 13 January 1953 as USS AMS-72, then MSC-72 Acacia Launched as USS AMS-79, then MSC-79 Betulla Launched as USS AMS-73, then MSC-73 Castagno Launched as USS AMS-74, then MSC-74;between 1978 and 1984 converted to minehunter; transferred 20 October 1995 to Greek Navy as Erato (M-60) Cedro Launched as USS AMS-88, then MSC-88;between 1978 and 1984 converted to minehunter Ciliegio Launched as USS AMS-80, then MSC-80 Faggio Launched as USS MSC-81 Frassino Launched as USS AMS-89, then MSC-89;between 1978 and 1984 converted to minehunter Gelso Launched as USS AMS-75, then MSC-75;between 1978 and 1984 converted to minehunter;transferred 20 October 1995 to Greek Navy as Evniki (M61) Larice Launched as USS AMS-82, then MSC-82 Olmo Launched as USS AMS-90, then MSC-90 Noce Launched as USS MSC-133 Ontano Launched as USS AMS-76, then MSC-76 Pino Launched as USS MSC-134 Pioppo Launched 15 August 1953 as USS AMS-135, then MSC-135;in 1973 converted to survey vessel as A 5307 Platano Launched as USS MSC-136;between 1978 and 1984 converted to minehunter Quercia Launched as USS AMS-137, then MSC-137
Adjutant (Legni, Agave batch) (Italy)		Agave (M 5531) Alloro (M 5532) Edera (M 5533) Gaggia (M 5534) Gelsomino(M5535) Giaggiolo (M 5536) Glicine (M 5537) Loto (M 5538) Mirto (M 5539) Timo (M 5540) Trifoglio (M 5541) Vischio (M 5542)	405	1955 1955 1955 1955 1955 1956 1956 1956 1954 1955 1955 1956	1990 1990 1990 1990 1990 1990 1990 1990 2000 1990 1990 1990	minesweeper build in Italy on Adjutant class plans Alloro in 1983 converted to training vessel A5308; Mirto in 1973 converted to survey vessel as A 5306
Adjutant (Legni, Bambù batch) (Italy)		Bambù (M 5521) Ebano (M 5522) Mango (M 5523) Mogano (M 5524) Palma (M 5525) Rovere (M 5526) Sandalo (M 5527)	405	8 September 1956 8.11.1956 12.1956 9.1.1957 1.3.1957 1.3.1957 17 April 1957	1999 1989 1996 1998 1999 1975 1988	minesweeper build in Italy on Adjutant class plans, under the off-shore procurement plan of the Military Defense Assistance Pact Bambù (USS AMS-214, then MSC-214) converted in 1988 to patrol ship as P 495; Ebano (USS AMS-215, then MSC-215); Mango (USS AMS-216, then MSC-216) converted in 1988 to patrol ship P 496; Mogano (USS AMS-217, then MSC-217) converted in 1988 to patrol ship as P 497; Palma (USS AMS-238, then MSC-238) converted in 1988 to patrol ship as P 498; Rovere, (USS AMS-239, then MSC-239); Sandalo (USS AMS-240, then MSC-240)
BYMS - Fiori (400) Azalea batch (United States)		Azalea (M 5401) Begonia (M 5402) Dalia (M 5404) Fiordaliso (M 5405) Gardenia (M 5406) Gladiolo (M 5416) Magnolia (M 5408) Orchidea (M 5412) Primula (M 5413) Tulipano (M 5414) Verbena (M 5415)	290	1947 1947 1947 1947 1947 1947 1947 1947 1947 1947 1947	1967 1.5.1966 1.5.1966 1967 1967 1967 1968 1966 1967 1967 1967	Launched as HMS BYMS 2142 (first encoding in Italy as DR 401) Launched as HMS BYMS 2073 (first encoding in Italy as DR 402); in service between 1 May 1966 and 1983 to Guardia di Finanza, named Maresciallo Aldo Oltramonti as training vessel Launched as HMS BYMS 2141 (first encoding in Italy as DR 403); in service between 1 May 1966 and 1983 to Guardia di Finanza, named Avallone as training vessel Launched as HMS BYMS 2277 (first encoding in Italy as DR 411) Launched as HMS BYMS 2150 (first encoding in Italy as DR 404) Launched as HMS BYMS 2042 (first encoding in Italy as DR 417) Launched as HMS BYMS 2206 (first encoding in Italy as DR 405) Launched as HMS BYMS 2037 (first encoding in Italy as DR 406) Launched as HMS BYMS 2278 (first encoding in Italy as DR 407) Launched as HMS BYMS 2194 (first encoding in Italy as DR 416) Launched as HMS BYMS 2280 (first encoding in Italy as DR 408)
BYMS - Fiori (400) Anemone batch (United States)		Anemone (M 5400) Biancospino (M 5403) Geranio (M 5407) Mughetto (M 5409) Narciso (M 5410) Oleandro (M 5411)	290	1947 1947 1947 1947 1947 1947	1966 1966 1966 1966 1966 1966	Launched as HMS BYMS 2009 (first encoding in Italy as DR 409) Launched as HMS BYMS 2012 (first encoding in Italy as DR 410) Launched as HMS BYMS 2014 (first encoding in Italy as DR 412) Launched as HMS BYMS 2023 (first encoding in Italy as DR 413) Launched as HMS BYMS 2024 (first encoding in Italy as DR 414) Launched as HMS BYMS 2027 (first encoding in Italy as DR 415)
Rosolino Pilo-class torpedo boat (Italy)		Giuseppe Cesare Abba (M 5330) Antonio Mosto (M 5353) Rosolino Pilo	645	1915 1915 25 May 1915	1 September 1958 15 December 1958 1.10.1954	Converted to minesweeper in 1953 as M 5330 Converted to minesweeper in 1952 as M 5353 Converted to minesweeper in 1952
La Masa-class torpedo boat (Italy)		Giacinto Carini (M 5331) Nicola Fabrizi (M 5333)	645	30 November 1917 12.7.1918	31 December 1958 1.2.1957	Converted to minesweeper in 1953 as M 5331; since 1958 until 1963 recoded GM517 as static training vessel Converted to minesweeper in 1953 as M 5333
MSI - Inshore Minesweeper)s
MSI-58 - Aragosta (Italy)		Aragosta (M 5440) Arsella (M 5451) Astice (M 5452) Attinia (M 5453) Calamaro(M5454) Conchiglia(M5455) Dromia (M 5456) Gambero (M 5457) Granchio (M 5448) Mitilo (M 5449) Ostrica (M 5460) Paguro (M 5461) Pinna (M 5462) Polipo (M 5463) Porpora (M 5464) Riccio (M 5465) Scampo (M 5466) Seppia (M 5467) Tellina (M 5468) Totano (M 5469)	177	20 May 1957 20 May 1957 19 June 1957 20 June 1957 10.7.1957 10.7.1957 10.7.1957 11.7.1957 11.7.1957 11.7.1957 8.7.1957 8.7.1957 10.7.1957 10.7.1957 10.7.1957 11.7.1957 1.8.1957 6.7.1957 8.7.1957 8.7.1957	17 July 2002 1.8.1973 5.12.2019 7.5.1974 1.5.1975 1.5.1974 1.4.1974 30 April 1982 30 November 1981 in service 1.3.1974 1.5.1974 30 April 1982 1.7.2002 5.12.2019 30 September 1981 5.12.2019 8.9.1973 1.5.1974 1.5.1974	Aragosta class was built in Italy on Ham-class minesweepers plans, under the off-shore procurement plan of the Military Defense Assistance Pact; Aragosta (USS MSI-58) since 1 February 1985 refitted as training vessel and recoded A 5378; on 17 July 2002 transferred to (Tunisian Navy – El Jem class) Arsella launched 22 August 1956 (USS MSI-59) Astice (USS MSI-60) since 1 February 1985 refitted as training vessel and recoded A 5379 Attinia (USS MSI-61) Calamaro (USS MSI-62) Conchiglia (USS MSI-63) Dromia (USS MSI-64) Gambero (USS MSI-65) Granchio (USS MSI-66) Mitilo (USS MSI-67) since 1 February 1985 refitted as training vessel and recoded A 5380 (in service) Ostrica (USS MSI-68) Paguro (USS MSI-69) Pinna (USS MSI-70) Polipo (USS MSI-71) since 1 February 1985 refitted as training vessel and recoded A 5381; on 17 July 2002 transferred to (Tunisian Navy – El Jem class) Porpora (USS MSI-72) since 1 February 1985 refitted as training vessel and recoded A 5382 Riccio (USS MSI-73); reclassified GLS-502 Scampo (USS MSI-74) was refitted as local personnel vessel coded MEN 205 and then 211 until 1979; between 1980/1983 refitted as Murena experimental ship (A 5305); since 2002 used as training vessel Seppia (USS MSI-55) Tellina (USS MSI-56) Totano (USS MSI-57)
Baglietto 68 t 1^ serie / VAS 201 (Italy)		VAS 491 VAS 492 VAS 493 VAS 494 VAS 495 VAS 496 VAS 497		1942 1942 1942 1942 1942 1943 1943	1956 1956 1956 1956 1956 1956 1956	Launched as VAS 204 Launched as VAS 211 Launched as VAS 218 Launched as VAS 224 Launched as VAS 223 Launched as VAS 237 Launched as VAS 241 > 1944 as RA 266 > 1949 as VAS 726 > 1954 as VAS 497
Vedetta (Italy)		Vedetta	70	1937	1951	
DV - Minesweeper patrol
DV 102 (Italy)		DV 102 DV 103 DV 104 DV 105 DV 113 DV 131 DV 132 DV 133 DV 134 DV 148 DV 149	110		27 June 1958 1.7.1958 30 June 1959 30 September 1954 1.9.1965 30 January 1959 30 September 1959 1959 30 September 1959 1.7.1958 1.9.1965	
DR - Minesweeper Tugs
Dance (DR 300) (United Kingdom)		DR 312 DR 316 DR 307 DR 308	760	1946 16 March 1946 2.1946 2.1946	1965 1965 1965 1965	Launched 6 May 1940 as Gavotte T115 (delivered to Italy as RD 312) Launched 21 May 1940 as Hornpipe T120 (delivered to Italy as RD 316) Launched 1 March 1941 as Minuet T131 (delivered to Italy as RD 307) Launched 27 January 1941 as Tarantella T142 (delivered to Italy as RD 308)
Shakespearian (DR 300) (United Kingdom)		DR 310 (M 5310)	740	3.1946	1965	Launched 7.10.941 as Othello TT76 (delivered to Italy as RD 310) then coded M 5310
Isles (DR 300) (United Kingdom)		DR 301 DR 302 DR 304 DR315 DR 313 DR305 DR 303 DR 306 DR 314 DR 311 DR 309	735	22 January 1946 22 January 1946 1.1946 3.1946 2.1946 19461.1946 22 February 1946 5.3.1942 16 February 1946 2.1946 16 March 1946	1965 1965 1965 1965 1965 1965 1965 1965 1965 1965 1965	Launched 12.4.941 as Burra T158 (delivered to Italy as RD 301) then coded M 5301 Launched 30 December 1940 as Cumbrae T154 (delivered to Italy as RD 302) then coded M 5302 Launched 15 June 1942 as Staffa T159 (delivered to Italy as RD 304) Launched 19 November 1941 as Stroma T150 (delivered to Italy as RD 315) Launched 9 August 1941 as Foula T203 (delivered to Italy as RD 315) Launched 2 April 1942 as Filla T212 (delivered to Italy as RD 315) Launched 28 May 1942 as Unst T213 (delivered to Italy as RD 315) Launched 7 February 1942 as Egilsay T215 (delivered to Italy as RD 315) Launched 5 March 1942 as Ensay T216 (delivered to Italy as RD 315) Launched 1 June 1942 as Mousa T295 (delivered to Italy as RD 315) Launched 17 August 1943 as Grain T360 (delivered to Italy as RD 315)
RD 16 (Italy)		RD 20	196	9.1945	30 June 1956	Launched 1917 as tug
RD 31 (Italy)		RD 32 RD 34	207		30 June 1956 30 June 1956	Launched 1919 as tug
RD 38 (Italy)		RD 38	201	10.1945	11 January 1955	Launched 1921 as tug
RD 39 (Italy)		RD 40 RD 41	203		15 April 1955 1 January 1953	Launched 1920 as tug Launched 1920 as tug
Admiralty Tipe I / M.M.S. (200) (United Kingdom)		DR 201 DR 202 DR 203 DR 204 DR 205 DR 206 DR 207 DR 208 DR 209 DR ? DR 210 DR 211 DR 216 ? DR 212 DR 213 DR 214 DR 215	295	1946 1946 1946 1946 1946 1946 1946 1946 1946 1947 1946 1946 1946 1946 1946 1946 1946	1950 1950 1949 1949 1950 1949 1950 1950 1950 1950 1951 1951 1951 1949 1950 1950 1950	Launched 31 October 1940 as MMS.10, J.510 (delivered to Italy as RD 201; then returned to Royal Navy) Launched 1941 as MMS.32, J.532 (delivered to Italy as RD 202; then returned to Royal Navy) Launched 1941 as MMS.34, J.534 (delivered to Italy as RD 203; then returned to Royal Navy) Launched 12 April 1941 as MMS35, J.535 (delivered to Italy as RD 204; then returned to Royal Navy) Launched 9 August 1941 as MMS.48, J.548 (delivered to Italy as RD 205; then returned to Royal Navy) Launched 12 April 1941 as MMS.50, J.550 (delivered to Italy as RD 206; then returned to Royal Navy) Launched 21 October 1941 as MMS.99, J.599 (delivered to Italy as RD 207; then returned to Royal Navy) Launched 4 November 1941 as MMS.100, J.600 (delivered to Italy as RD 208; then returned to Royal Navy) Launched 25 October 1941 as MMS.102, J.602 (delivered to Italy as RD 209; then returned to Royal Navy) Launched 4 May 1942 as MMS.103, J.603(then returned to Royal Navy) Launched 5 August 1941 as MMS.104, J.604 (delivered to Italy as RD 210; then returned to Royal Navy) Launched 30 September 1941 as MMS.105, J.605 (delivered to Italy as RD 211; then returned to Royal Navy) Launched 30 September 1941 as MMS.106, J.606 Launched 22 October 1941 as MMS.135, J.635 (delivered to Italy as RD 212; then returned to Royal Navy) Launched 7 January 1942 as MMS.167, J.667 (delivered to Italy as RD 213; then returned to Royal Navy) Launched 20 January 1942 as MMS.172, J.672 (delivered to Italy as RD 214; then returned to Royal Navy) Launched 2 May 1942 as MMS.185, J.685 (delivered to Italy as RD 215; then returned to Royal Navy)

== Minelayer ==
Class	Picture	Shipyard Origin	Ships	Launched	Commissioned	Retired	Displacement (ton)	Length (m)	Speed (kn)	Note
Minelayer
Fasana		Cantiere Navale di Castellammare di Stabia (Naples) (Italy)	Fasana	1926	1927	1950	610	58,52	10	

== Landing ship ==
Class	Picture	Shipyard Origin	Ships	Launched	Commissioned	Retired	Displacement (ton)	Length (m)	Speed (kn)	Note
Tank Landing Ships
De Soto County (Grado)		Newport News Shipbuilding; Newport News; Virginia (United States)	Grado (L 9890) Caorle (L 9891)	28 February 1957 5.03.1957	17 July 1972 17 July 1972	16 January 1988 1988	7,823	136	17,5	ex USS De Soto County (LST-1171) ex USS York County (LST-1175)
Quarto		Arsenale Militare Marittimo (Taranto) (Italy)	Quarto (A 5302)	18 June 1967		1991	980	69	13	Fitted as landing transport ship with 2 LCM onboard Initially coded A 5302; Since 1 January 1975 converted to experimental role as A 5314
Kenneth Whiting	USS St. George (AV-16)	Tacoma; Seattle (United States)	Andrea Bafile (L 9871)	14 February 1944	11 December 1968	31 May 1988	13,910	196	19	ex USS St. George (AV-16); For a short time coded as support ship (A 5314) then modified as L 9871; Since retire, in 1981, was used as barracks ship to Arsenale Militare Marittimo Taranto Naval Base
Andromeda; Type C2-S-B1	USS Whitley (AKA-91)	Moore Dry Dock Company; Oakland; California (United States)	Etna (L 9870)	22 June 1944	2.1962	1981	12,610	139,95	16,5	ex USS Whitley (AKA-91); For a short time coded as support ship A 5328 then modified as L 9871; 22 LCM / LCVP on board for about 300 marines embarked
LST-1		Dravo Corporation; Pittsburgh; Pennsylvania (United States)	Anteo (L 9869)	22 May 1943	20 November 1962	1 August 1973	4,145	100	12	ex-USS Alameda County (LST-32); Then AVB-1; In Italy initially coded as support ship A 5306 then modified as L 9869
Transport ships
Vesuvio		Cantiere Navale OTO (La Spezia) (Italy)	Stromboli (A 5329) Vesuvio (A 5330)	1940 4.12.1949	1953 1955	1972 1.7.1972	4,325	108,8		ex civilian ship buy in 1948 and refitted for landing transport ship with 4 LCM onboard ex civilian ship buy in 1948 and refitted for landing transport ship, with 4 LCM onboard
Special forces tenders
Barnegat (Cavezzale)		Lake Washington Shipyard; Houghton; Washington (United States)	Pietro Cavezzale (A 5301)	17 September 1942	23 October 1957	31 March 1994	2,800	94,7	18,2	Launched as AVP-28 than USS Oyster Bay (AGP-6)
Gabbiano, serie Ape		Navalmeccanica Spa; Castellammare di Stabia (Naples) (Italy)	Ape (A 5328)	22 November 1942	15 May 1943	1981	740	64,4	18	Until 1964 in service as F 567; Between 1964 and 1965 refitted as COMSUBIN Support Ship and coded A 5328
Ciclope		Cantieri Pattison; Naples (Italy)	Ercole (A 5302)	15 July 1902	1903	1964	1,070		13,5	Launched as rescue tug Ciclope; 1949 named Ercole; Between 1949/1951 converted in special forces tender by Navalmeccanica Spa; Castellammare di Stabia

== Landing craft ==
Class	Picture	Ships	Displacement Tonnes	Commissioned	Retired	Note
Hovercraft
Saunders Roe SRN6 (United Kingdom)		HC9801	10,9	5 November 1968	30 April 1982	
LCM - Landing Craft Mechanized / Moto Trasporto Mezzi
LCM(3) - MTM (United States)		MTM 9901 MTM 9902 MTM 9903 MTM 9904 MTM 9905 MTM 9906 MTM 9907 MTM 9908 MTM 9909 MTM 9910 MTM 9911 MTM 9912 MTM 9913 MTM 9914 MTM 9915 MTM 9916 MTM 9917 MTM 9918 MTM 9919 MTM 9920	52	1952/1953	/ / / / / 13 July 1974 / / / / / / / / / / / / / /	Launched between 194?/1944
LCM(6) - MTM (United States)		MTM 9921 MTM 9922 MTM 9923 MTM 9924 MTM 9925 MTM 9926 MTM 9927 MTM 9928 MTM 9929	56	1952/1953	13 July 1974 / / / / 13 July 1974 / / /	
LCM(6) - MTM (United States)		MTM 542 MTM 543 MTM 544 MTM 545 MTM 546 MTM 547 MTM 548 MTM 549 MTM 550 MTM 551 MTM 552 MTM 553 MTM 554 MTM 555 MTM 556	56			
LCVP - Landing Craft Vehicle Personnel / Moto Trasporto Personale
LCVP - MTP (United States)		MTP 9701 MTP 9702 MTP 9703 MTP 9704 MTP 9705 MTP 9706 MTP 9707 MTP 9708 MTP 9709 MTP 9710 MTP 9711 MTP 9712 MTP 9713 MTP 9714 MTP 9715 MTP 9716 MTP 9717 MTP 9718 MTP 9719 MTP 9720 MTP 9721 MTP 9722 MTP 9723 MTP 9724 MTP 9725	8	1952/1953	6 July 1974 6.7.1974 / 6.7.1974 6.7.1974 6.7.1974 / / 6.7.1974 / / 6.7.1974 / / / / 6.7.1974 6.7.1974 / / 6.7.1974 6.7.1974 / / /	Launched between 1943/1952
LCVP - MTP (United States)		MTP 9726 MTP 9727 MTP 9728 MTP 9729 MTP 9730 MTP 9731 MTP 9732 MTP 9733 MTP 9734 MTP 9735 MTP 9736 MTP 9737 MTP 9738 MTP 9739 MTP 9740 MTP 9741 MTP 9742 MTP 9743 MTP 9744 MTP 9745 MTP 9746 MTP 9747 MTM 9748 MTM 9749 MTM 9750 MTM 9751 MTM 9752 MTM 9753 MTM 9754	8		/ / / / / 6.7.1974 / / / / / / / / / / / / / / / / / / / / / / / /	

== Replenishment ships ==
Class	Picture	Ships	Displacement Tonnes	Commissioned	Retired	Note
Replenishment oilers
T2-SE-A1 tanker (United States)		Sterope (A 5368)	21,800	1959	1975	Launched in 1944 as USS Forbes Road; Since 1947 to 1953 as Cleveland (Cleveland Petroleum Co, London); Since 1953 to 1959 as Enrico Incom (armatore Enrico Insom, Roma); In 1959 to Italian Navy as Sterope (A 5368)
Oilers
(Italy)		Brennero	10,500	1948	1954	Launched 1921 for Italian Royal Navy; Since 1926 to Società Nazionale Olii Minerali – Milano; Since 1929 to Garibaldi – Genova (Ge 1588); 30 March 1941 Confiscated in New York from U.S.A. government 1941 as Gold Heels (Panama); 1944 as Carondelet; 1946 as Gold Heels; Since 1948 as Brennero
(Italy)		Nettuno	10,310	1917	1954	
(Germany)		Urano	11,200	1923	1 August 1954	Launched 7 May 1923 by Deutsche Werke Kiel for Germany Navy
(Italy)		Prometeo	1,200	1920	1958	Launched 1919 in Trieste as Ostia; After radiation converted to inshore oiler as G.R.G. 522
Pagano (Italy)		Stige	1,470	1925	1950	

== Boom defence vessels ==
Class	Picture	Shipyard Origin	Ships	Launched	Commissioned	Retired	Displacement (ton)	Length (m)	Speed (kn)	Note
Boom defence vessels
Alicudi		Cantiere Navale Ansaldo; Livorno (Italy)	Alicudi (A 5304) Filicudi (A 5305)	11 July 1954 26 September 1954	1955 1955	30 April 1991 1.11.1977	832	46,3	13	Financed by MDAP program as USS AN-99

== Water tanker vessels ==
Class	Picture	Ships	Displacement Tonnes	Commissioned	Retired	Note
Water tanker vessels
Piave (Italy)		Piave (A 5334)	5,003	23 May 1973	2009 ?	Launched 18 December 1971; Used as static training ship to COMSUBIN base, Varignano (La Spezia)
Simeto; CINET; Molfetta (Italy)		Simeto (A 5375)	1,914	9 July 1988	2002	Launched 4 April 1988 as hull 3-86; Delivered 10 July 2003 to Tunisian Navy as Ain Zaghouan
Brenta (Italy)		Basento (A 5356) Bradano (A 5357) Brenta (A 5358)	1,985	19 July 1971 29 December 1971 18 April 1972	1 October 2004 1.12.2001 1.2.2002	Launched 2 February 1970; delivered 23 September 2009 to Ecuadorian Navy as BAE Atahualpa TR-63 Launched 3 September 1971 Launched 11 May 1971
US Army Design #294 - Isonzo (United States)		Isonzo (A 5372) Ticino (A 5377)	1,658	1948 1948	31 May 1974 1984	Launched 6.1944 as US Army Y-77 Launched 6.1944 as US Army Y79
USS YW-83 - Adige (United States)		Adige (A 5369) Flegetonte (A 5371) Tanaro (A 5376)	1,517	1948 1948 1948	1989 8.1.1974 1986	Launched 1944 as USS YW-92 Launched 1944 as USS YW-95 Launched as USS YW-99
Bormida (Italy)		Mincio (A 5374)	670	1930	1993	
Velino (Italy)		Simeto	171	1905	1984	
(Italy)		Stura	125	1942	1982	Launched 1917 as mercantile ship
Po (Italy)		Po (A 5365) Volturno (A 5366)	3,820	1937 1937	1974 1976	
(Italy)		Arno (A 5370)	657	1929	1974	
(Japan)		Frigido	405	31 January 1917	1975	Launched 1916 in Japan (Shirato Zozemsho docks - Osaka) as Takin Maru; Delivered to Italian Royal Navy as minesweeper G.5; Since 21 July 1919 converted in water tanker vessel as Frigido
Sebeto (Italy)		Metauro (A 5373)	602	1934	1974	
(Italy)		Sprugola	318	1917	1974	launched as mercantile ship
(Italy)		Sesia (A 5375)	1,460	1934	1972	
Dalmazia (Italy)		Dalmazia (A 5367)	3,137	1923	1971	
Ticino (Italy)		Tronto	120	1890	1968	
(Italy)		Velino (A 5397)	1,340	1930	1958	
Avisio (Italy)		Idria Leno Timavo Vipacco	280	1926 1925 1926 1925	1954 1974 1980 1961	
Adda (Italy)		Ofanto Oristano	280	1914 1914	1982 1954	
Pagano (Italy)		Pagano	1,454	1922	1951	

== Transport ships ==
Class	Picture	Shipyard Origin	Ship	Launched	Commissioned	Retired	Displacement (ton)	Length (m)	Speed (kn)	Note
Transport ships
Cherso		A.K.T. Ges Neptun; Rostok (Germany)	Cherso	1912	1923	30 June 1951	4,427	91,6		Launched for Austro-Hungarian Navy as Amalfi; Delivered to Royal Italian Navy by war reparation
		Cantiere Navale Ansaldo; Sestri Ponente (Genova) (Italy)	Monte Grappa (A 5328)	1942	10 March 1943	1958	840	67,97	14,5	Ordered by Kriegsmarine as KT10 for Royal Italian Navy
Personnel Transport ships
		Cantiere Navale Tosi; Taranto (Italy)	Tarantola	10 October 1942	1942	1993	512	28,31	10,5	Launched as Ammunition transport After WWII converted for personnel transport (1,470 inside, 291 outside) to Taranto Naval Base

== Coastal Transport Vessels - MTC ==
Class	Picture	Ships	Displacement Tonnes	Commissioned	Retired	Note
Coastal Transport vessels
MTC Batch 1 (MZ Typ A / MFP-A) (Italy)		MTC 1001 (A 5341) MTC 1002 (A 5342) MTC 1003 (A 5343) MTC 1004 (A 5344) MTC 1005 (A 5345) MTC 1006 (A 5346)	239	1942 1942 1942 1942 1942 1942	1 March 1995 1.3.1963 31 March 1984 30 April 1988 1987 1992	Launched 23 June 1942 as MZ 722 > 1 May 1950 as MTC 1001 Launched 27 June 1942 as MZ 726 > 1 May 1950 as MTC 1002 Launched 2 July 1942 as MZ 728 > 1 May 1950 as MTC 1003 Launched 2 July 1942 as MZ 729 > 1 May 1950 as MTC 1004 Launched 1942 as MZ 737 > 1 May 1950 as MTC 1005; Preserved to Museo Storico Navale di Venezia Launched 1942 as MZ 758 > 1 May 1950 as MTC 1006
MTC Batch 2 (MZ Typ B) (Italy)		MTC 1007 (A 5347) MTC 1008 (A 5348) MTC 1009 (A 5349)	278,5	1943 1943 1943	31 July 1981 1.12.1979 1984	Launched between 9.1942/3.1943 as MZ 776 > 1 May 1950 as MTC 1007 Launched 9.1942/3.1943 as MZ 784 > 1 May 1950 as MTC 1008 Launched between 9.1942/3.1943 as MZ 800 > 1 May 1950 as MTC 1009
MTC Batch 3 (MFP-D) (Germany)		MTC 1010 (A 5350)	239	1946	1 August 1968	Launched 21 May 1942 as F 831 Germany Navy > 1946 as MZ 831 > 1 May 1950 as MTC 1010
MTC (MFP-DM) (Italy)		MTC 1101 (A 5351)	440	1945	1 August 1968	Launched 5 April 1943 for Germany Navy as F 1046 > AF 1046 > Since 1945 to Italian Navy as MZ 1046 > 1 May 1950 as MTC 1101
MTC (MFP-C) (Netherlands)		MTC 1102 (A 5352) MTC 1103 (A 5353) MTC 1104 (A 5354)	220	1946 1946 1946	'60 1.10.1970 1.7.1968	Launched 9 August 1941 for Germany Navy as F 435 > 1946 to Italian Navy as GLS 435 > 1 May 1950 as MTC 1102 Launched 9 August 1941 for Germany Navy as F 436 > 1946 to Italian Navy as GLS 436 > 1 May 1950 as MTC 1103 Launched 9 August 1941 for Germany Navy as F 437 > 1946 to Italian Navy as GLS 437 > 1 May 1950 as MTC 1104
MTC (MFP-DM) (Italy)		MTC 1105 (A 5355) MTC 1109 (A 5359)	256	1945 1946	'60 1.5.1950	Launched 5 April 1943 for Germany Navy as F 1045 > 1945 to Italian Navy as MZ 1045 > 1 May 1950 as MTC 1105 Launched 5 April 1943 for Germany Navy as F 943 > 1946 to Italian Navy as MZ 943 > 1 May 1950 reserved code MTC 1109
MTC (MFP-D) (Italy)		MTC 1106 (A 5356) MTC 1108 (A 5358)	239	1945 1945	1 May 1950 1.5.1950	Launched 10 June 1943 for Germany Navy as F 1191 > 1945 to Italian Navy as MZ 1191 > 1 May 1950 reserved code MTC 1106 Launched 10 June 1943 for Germany Navy as F 1155 > 1945 to Italian Navy as MZ 1155 > 1 May 1950 reserved code MTC 1108
MTC (MFP-A) (Germany)		MTC 1107 (A 5357)	220	1946		Launched 28 June 1941 for Germany Navy as F 360 > 1945 to Italian Navy as MZ 360 > 1 May 1950 as MTC 1107

== Rescue ship ==
Class	Picture	Shipyard Origin	Ships	Launched	Commissioned	Retired	Displacement (ton)	Length (m)	Speed (kn)	Note
Submarine rescue ships
		Cantieri Navali Riuniti; Ancona (Kingdom of Italy)	Proteo (A 5310)	1943	24 August 1951	31 May 2004	2,178	75.94	16	ex Perseo; Captured 1944 by Kriegsmarine; Re-launched 2 June 1951 by Cantieri Navali Riuniti in Ancona as Proteo; Delivered 31 May 2004 to Bulgarian Navy as 224 (Протео)
Rescue ships
		Cantiere Navale Picchiotti; Viareggio (Italy)	Raffaele Paolucci	1970	12 September 1970	9 January 2001	70	30	32	officially used as ambulance vessel and Italian Republic presidential yacht June 2006 sold to private owner
		(Kingdom of Italy)	Marechiaro	1929	7 May 1936	1 February 1957	127			ex Ercole; Launched as Città di Sorrento owned by Riunite Società Sorrentine di Navigazione – Sorrento
		Smulders Schiedam shipyards Netherlands	Anteo	20 December 1912	28 March 1914	19 May 1954	1,362			

== Factory vessel ==
Class	Picture	Ships	Displacement Tonnes	Commissioned	Retired	Note
Littoral factory vessels
LCT(2) - MOC 1201 (United Kingdom)		MOC 1201 (A 5331) MOC 1206 (A 5336) MOC 1207 (A 5337) MOC 1208 (A 5338)	453	4 May 1945 1 October 1952 1951 1951	31 October 2008 1955 1989 1984	MOC 1201 launched 17 November 1941 as HMS LCT(2)-167 > LCT 167 > 1945 as NSC(L)34 > delivered to Italian Navy 4 May 1945 as MZ-34 > 1 May 1950 as MOC 1201 for torpedo support MOC 1206 Launched 4 October 1941 as HMS LCT(2)-140 > LCT 140 > 1945 as NSC(L)77 > August 1946 as Parma - Lloyd Mediterraneo, Roma > Sold 1 December 1950 to Italian Navy > Commissioned 1 October 1952 as MOC 1206; 20 December 1955 stranded in Red Sea; Preserved at Haifa Museum as INS Af Al Pi Chen MOC 1207 launched 3 January 1942 as HMS LCT(2)-170 > HMS NSC(L)-50 MOC 1208 launched 17 January 1942 as HMS LCT(2)-171 > LCT 171 >HMS NSC(L)-51
MOC 1202 (United Kingdom)		MOC 1202 (A 5332) MOC 1203 (A 5333) MOC 1204 (A 5334) MOC 1205 (A 5335) MOC 1209 (A 5339)	712	1 September 1951 1 December 1950 4 October 1951 3 December 1951 1951	1 April 1999 1998 2008 1998 1956	MOC 1202 launched 3 January 1942 as HMS LCT(3)-330; then Città di Civitavecchia; 1948 delivered to Italian Navy as GLS 438 > Sold 1 May 1950 to Italian Navy as MOC 1202 > 1 September 1951 delivery and used for minesweeper support MOC 1203 launched 28 April 1942 as HMS LCT(3)-420 > February 1948 as Sandalia - Lloyd Mediterraneo, Roma > Sold 1 December 1950 to Italian Navy as MOC 1203; Delivered 18 June 2002 to Albanian Navy as A223 MOC 1204 launched 25 July 1942 as HMS LCT(3)-347; then Fiumicino MOC 1205 launched 1942 HMS LCT(3)-307; then Cagliari > Sold 1 December 1950 to Italian Navy MOC 1209 Launched as HMS LCT(3)-, then La Fionda
Factory vessels
Antonio Pacinotti (Kingdom of Italy)		Antonio Pacinotti	3,113	1924	December 1952	Launched 20 April 1922 as Città di Sassari converted in 1925 to submergible support ship for Italian Royal Navy, Antonio Pacinotti; 1949 converted to factory and support vessel

== Headlights service vessel ==
Class	Picture	Shipyard Origin	Ships	Launched	Commissioned	Retired	Displacement (ton)	Length (m)	Speed (kn)	Note
Headlights service ships
		Norderwerft - Hamburg (Weimar Republic)	Rampino (A 5309)	1921	1942	1 October 1976	645	47.3	7	Launched by Reinhold Holtz shipyards as Johanne Klattes for Nicolaus Ebeling - Hamburg, company Sold 1937 to Lucio Ercole – Italy, company as Spigola; Sold 1942 to Italian Royal Navy and converted to cable laying vessel, since 19 April 1943 as Rampino; Since 1953 converted to Headlights service ship as Rampino (A 5309)
LCT(3) - MTF 1301		Sir William Arrol - Meadowside, Scotland (U.K.) (United Kingdom)	MTF 1301 (A 5361) MTF 1302 (A 5362) MTF 1303 (A 5363)	1942 6 July 1942 1942	7 October 1946 7 October 1946 7 October 1946	1990 1990 1990				HMS LCT(3)-? > 1946 MZ.832 > GLS 432 > 1950 as MTF 1301 HMS LCT(3)-396 > 7 August 1946 as MZ.833 > 1 September 1947 as GLS 433 > 1 May 1950 as MTF 1302 HMS LCT(3)-421 > 1946 MZ.834 > GLS 434 > 1950 as MTF 1303
Panigaglia		Cantiere San Giorgio; La Spezia (Kingdom of Italy)	Buffoluto (A 5327)	16 April 1924	15 December 1924	24 January 1973	1,071	56,2	12	Launched as ammunition transport vessel and minelayer Since 7 June 1948 converted to headlights service vessel

== Survey vessels ==
Class	Picture	Shipyard Origin	Ships	Launched	Commissioned	Retired	Displacement (ton)	Length (m)	Speed (kn)	Note
Survey vessels
Action		Morton Engine and Dry Dock Company Ltd. - Montreal, Quebec (Canada)	Staffetta (A 5307)	4 December 1942	1949	1970	1,378	63	17	Launched as USS Prudent (PG-96); Delivered 22 September 1947 to Cameli, Italian merchant company, as Elbano; In 1949 buys from Italian Navy and converted, between 1949/1951, as survey vessel: renamed Staffetta
Ostia		CNT Cantiere Navale Triestino – Trieste (Kingdom of Italy)	Azio	4 May 1927	1928	1 January 1957	1,040	62.5	15	Launched as minelayer

== Research vessels ==
Class	Picture	Shipyard Origin	Ships	Launched	Commissioned	Retired	Displacement (ton)	Length (m)	Speed (kn)	Note
Research vessels
		Cantiere Navalmeccanico; Senigallia (Ancona) (Italy)	Barbara (A 5315)	1970	1975	1988	195	30,5	12	Used in Salto di Quirra polygon as launch and recovery vessel for RPV Meteor CT 20 type XXI Since 1985 converted to coastal patrol boat Barbara (P 492) Since 1988 delivered to Italian Coast Guard as CP 452

== Training vessels ==
Class	Picture	Shipyard Origin	Ships	Launched	Commissioned	Retired	Displacement (ton)	Length (m)	Speed (kn)	Note
Sailing vessels
		Viareggio (Livorno) yards (Kingdom of Italy)	Ebe	1921	1952	1959	360	51.5	14	Schooner ex-Gabbiano for Lloyd Royal Belge Ltd. di Renfrew; Sold in 1926 to Società Calcare, Calce & Industrie Affini – Naples; Sold in 1930 to A. Finocchiaro di Genova and renamed San Giorgio; Sold to Italian Navy in 1952; Preserved at Museo Nazionale Scienza e Tecnologia "Leonardo da Vinci" - Milano

== Tugboats ==
Class	Country of origin	Picture	Ships	Displacement Tonnes	Commissioned	Decommissioned	Note
Oceanic tugboats
Atlante	(Italy)		Atlante (A 5317); Prometeo (A 5318)	750	1974/1976	starting in October 2004	Commissioned by Visintini - Donada docks
V3-S-AH2; Ciclope	(United States)		Ciclope (A 5319) Titano (A 5325) Nereo	1,220	1947 1947 1949	1983 July 1974 August 1956	Delivered May 1944 as USS Durable (MC-1417) > HMS ODT Ataran > 1947 to Italian Navy > January 1948 as Ciclope Delivered April 1944 as USS Power (MC-1415) > HMS ODT Atengo > June 1947 to Italian Navy as Titano Delivered July 1944 as USS Helper (MC-1419) > HMS ODT Atoyac > October 1949 to Italian Navy as Nereo
US Army Design 293; Atleta	(United States)		Atleta Tenace (A 5324) Forte (A 5321) Colosso (A 5320)	602	1946 1946 1946 1946	1977 1974 ? 1980	Launched September 1943/April 1944 as US Army LT-152 Launched September 1943/April 1944 as US Army LT-154 Launched September 1943/April 1944 as US Army LT-159 Launched December 1943/April 1944 as US Army LT-214
Vigoroso	(Italy)		Gagliardo (A 5322) Robusto (A 5323)	506	1940 1940	1988 1988	
Chirone	(Kingdom of Italy)		San Giusto	486	1942	1987	Launched as Chirone for Royal Italian Navy > 1945 to Trieste used by Governo Militare Alleato (Gestione U.GE.NA.) > 1948 renamed San Giusto > 1956 recommissioned to Italian Navy
Porto Empedocle	(Austria-Hungary)		Porto Empedocle	482	10 January 1922	31 July 1971	Launched 1914 as Dolphin for Austro-Hungarian Navy
Atlante	(Italy)		Atlante (A 5317)	355	1926	1968	Since 1 May 1953 as A 5317
Littoral tugboats
Ischia class	(Italy)		Porto d'Ischia (Y 436); Riva Trigoso (Y 443)	297	1969	200?	Commissioned by CNR docks
Tugboats
Piombino	(Netherlands)		Piombino	222	1916	1978	Launched 1915 as President Piroy in Netherlands
Sant'Antioco	(Italy)		Sant'Antioco	192	1937	1975	
Volosca	(Austria-Hungary)		Volosca	98	1921	1974	Launched 1897 as Pluto (T99) for Austro-Hungarian Navy
Circeo	(Austria-Hungary)		Circeo	154	1924	1970	Launched 1918 as T 163 for Austro-Hungarian Navy
Sant'Antonio	(Italy)		Sant'Antonio	225	1957	1974	
San Pietro	(Kingdom of Italy)		San Pietro San Vito	108	1926 1926	1971 1971	Launched 1914 as mercantile Lowcen Launched 1914 as mercantile Zeta
Lipari	(German Empire)		Lipari	318	1921	1971	Launched 1917 as Dannsfeld for Imperial German Navy
Capo Rizzuto	(Italy)		Capo Rizzuto (Y 473)	70	1958	1988	
US Army Ocean Tugs Design 327-A; Ausonia	(United States)		Ausonia (Y 401) Panaria (Y 431)	244 232	1948 1948	31 July 1984 1983	Delivery April 1944 as US Army ST-486 Delivery between April–November 1944 as US Army ST-711
US Army Tugs Design 257-A; Albenga	(United States)		Albenga (Y 412) Boeo (Y 417) Nisida (Y 437)	192 175 120	1948 1948 1948	1990 30 April 1986 31 December 1992	Delivered December 1943 as US Army ST-77 Delivered December 1943 as US Army ST-76 Delivered March 1944 as US Army ST-333
US Army DPC Tugs; Miseno	(United States)		Miseno (Y 427) Montecristo (Y 429)	247 268	1948 1946	1988 1989	Delivered 1944 as US DPC-29 > 1944 as US Army ST-795 > 1950 as Miseno (Y 427) Delivered 1943 as US DPC-79 > 1944 as US Army ST-762 > 1950 as Montecristo (Y 429)
Ministry of War Transport; Empire – near-WARRIOR Type	(United Kingdom)		Ustica (Y 448) Vigoroso	425	1950 1972	1991 19 September 1990	Launched 1935 as MOWT Empire Race > Capo d'Orlando > A 5324 Launched 6 March 1946 and since 1958 to Royal Navy as MOWT Empire Lucy > July 1962 Ognina by Impresse Marittime Augustea SpA
Ministry of War Transport; Empire – Modified WARRIOR Type	(United Kingdom)		Ercole (A 5388) Favignana (Y 424)	522	1971 ?	1989 ?	Launched as MOWT Empire Belle > ELF > Mare Jonio Launched as MOWT Empire Phyllis > 'Hayat (Kuwait) > Brucoli > A 5385
Arsachena	(Kingdom of Italy)		Arsachena	180	1932	1991	
San Bartolomeo	(Kingdom of Italy)		San Bartolomeo San Benedetto	173	1942 1942	1968 1990	
Passero	(Kingdom of Italy)		Passero Linaro Mesco	87	1934 1934 1934	1983 1986 1989	
Sperone	(Italy)		Sperone	64	1954	1988	
Porto Pisano; 1st batch	(Kingdom of Italy)		Porto Pisano Porto Fossone (Y 415) Porto Recanati Porto Torres	268	1937 1937 1937 1936	1979 1973 1984 1974	
Porto Pisano; 2nd batch	(Kingdom of Italy)		Porto Vecchio	268	1942	1975	
Capo Circeo	(Italy)		Capo Circeo	69	1956	1983	
Senigallia	(Kingdom of Italy)		Ventimiglia	222	1940	1983	
Tino	(Kingdom of Italy)		Tino	268	1931	1983	
Salvore	(Kingdom of Italy)		Salvore (A 5391) Porto Rosso	284 274	1929 1928	1979 1968	Miseno was renamed, in 1941, Porto Rosso
Linosa	(Kingdom of Italy)		Linosa Asinara Carbonara	131	1937 1937 1937	1972 1981 1978	
Tavolara	(Italy)		Tavolara	67	1956	1976	
Cordevole	(Netherlands)		Cordevole	110	3 December 1916	1976	Launched 1915 as mercantile Dora in Netherlands
Licosa	(German Empire)		Licosa	108	1936	1975	Launched 1913 as mercantile Ernesto in German Empire
Noli	(Kingdom of Italy)		Noli	60	1935	1973	Launched 1928 as mercantile Olga
Emilio	(Netherlands)		Emilio	65	1952	1973	Launched 1912 as Corry for Royal Netherlands Navy
Saturno	(United Kingdom of Great Britain and Ireland)		Saturno	160	1939	1973	Launched 1906 in United Kingdom as mercantile Emma
Argentario	(Netherlands)		Argentario	87	1916	1973	Launched 1916 as mercantile Rival II in Netherlands
Abbazia	(Netherlands)		Abbazia	235	1917	1960	Launched 1916 as mercantile Susanna in Netherlands > Lesina
Tagliamento	(Netherlands)		Tagliamento	70	1916	1971	Launched 1913 as mercantile Lena in Netherlands
	(Netherlands)		Teulada	120	1916	1971	Launched as mercantile Christian in Netherlands
Promontore	(Netherlands)		Promontore	140	1916	1968	Launched 1914 as mercantile Directeur Letzer in Netherlands > Ostia
	(Austria-Hungary)		Portorose	101	1921	1964	Launched 1917 as T 103 for Austro-Hungarian Navy
Liscanera	(Netherlands)		Liscanera	222	1916	1963	Launched 1916 as mercantile Gertruda in Netherlands
Irene	(Italy)		Irene		1952	1960	
Lilibeo	(Netherlands)		Lilibeo	144	1916	1959	Launched 1915 as mercantile Endrika in Netherlands
Cefalù	(France)		Cefalù	132	1936	1957	Launched 1904 in France as mercantile Brandale
Mercurio	(Kingdom of Italy)		Mercurio		1944	1957	Launched as mercantile San Raffaele
Sciacca	(Kingdom of Italy)		Sciacca	120	1935	1956	Launched 1902 as mercantile Salerno
Astico	(Netherlands)		Astico	80	1916	1956	Launched 1909 as mercantile Christian in Netherlands
	(Kingdom of Italy)		Lampedusa	166	1915	1951	during World War II used for headlights service vessel
Gaeta	(Netherlands)		Gaeta	250	1917	1951	Launched 1916 as mercantile Guglielmina in Netherlands
Rapallo	(Kingdom of Italy)		Rapallo	327	31 August 1937	1950	
Rescue tugboats
	(Weimar Republic)		Polifemo	1,285	1922	1952	Launched 1921 in Weimar Republic as Einigkeit
Riverine tugboats
Mestre	(Kingdom of Italy)		Mestre Chioggia	150	1919 1919	1968 1989	
Lagoon tugboats
R.L.1	(Kingdom of Italy)		R.L. 1 R.L. 3 R.L. 9 R.L. 10	52	1919 1919 1920 1921	1973 1960 1960 1951	
R.L.11	(Italy)		R.L. 11		1948	1951	
R.L.12	(Italy)		R.L. 12		1948	1956	
Harbor tugboats
RP 101	(Italy)		RP 103 (Y 406) RP 105 (Y 408)	85	1972 1972	201? 201?	commissioned in 1972/1974 by Visintini-Donada docks
RP 113	(Italy)		RP 114 (Y 464)	120	1979	201?	
N.80	(Austria-Hungary)		N.80 N.87 N.88 N.94	47	1919 1923 1923 1924	1974 1975 1985 1965	Launched 1918 as T 69 for Austro-Hungarian Navy Launched 1918 as T 67 for Austro-Hungarian Navy Launched 1918 as T 68 for Austro-Hungarian Navy Launched 1918 as T 65 for Austro-Hungarian Navy
	(Austria-Hungary)		N.78	28	1922	1985	Launched 1913 as T 91 for Austro-Hungarian Navy
ex Ministeriale	(Kingdom of Italy)		Colonnello Pozzi Generale Valfrè Generale Pollio	100	1939 1939 1940	1982 1951 1951	Colonnello Pozzi launched 1912
San Biagio	(Italy)		San Biagio Sant'Antonio San Daniele	225	2 May 1957 2 May 1957 2 May 1957	1 November 1975 30 April 1974 1 April 1973	Launched 18 July 1944 Launched 8 August 1944 Launched 27 July 1944 as San Cesareo
N.2	(Netherlands)		Gorgona	162	1916	1975	Launched as mercantile in Netherlands > N.3
N.2	(Italy)		N.2		1941	1974	Launched as mercantile Nibbio
N.30	(Kingdom of Italy)		N.32	87	1908	1973	
N.24	(Kingdom of Italy)		N.24 N.26 N.27	77	1911 1911 1911	1964 1956 1971	
	(Kingdom of Italy)		N.47	60	1916	1971	Launched as mercantile N.631
N.1	(Kingdom of Italy)		N.1		1941	1965	Launched 1919 as mercantile Ipso
	(Netherlands)		Licata	85	1916	1965	Launched 1914 in Netherlands as mercantile Harmonie > Isonzo
	(Netherlands)		Pianosa	183	1915	'60	Launched 1914 in Netherlands as mercantile Waterweg N.2
N.5	(Kingdom of Italy)		N.5 N.22 N.23	99	1913 1914 1914	1959 1955 1972	
N.28	(Kingdom of Italy)		Capraia	128	1903	1957	Launched as N.29
N.52	(Netherlands)		N.52 N.53	65	1918 1915	1957 1957	Launched in Netherlands as mercantile > Lucia Launched in Netherlands as mercantile Rival
	(Kingdom of Italy)		N.9	99	1913	1954	
	(Kingdom of Italy)		N.4	72	1933	1951	Launched 1917 as mercantile
	(Kingdom of Italy)		N.3		1941	1951	Launched as mercantile Conte di San Robert
Nisida	(Kingdom of Italy)		Procida	135	1913	1951	
N.35	(Kingdom of Italy)		N.35 N.36	104	1915 1915	1951 1951	

== Others ==
Class	Picture	Shipyard Origin	Ships	Launched	Commissioned	Retired	Displacement (ton)	Length (m)	Speed (kn)	Note
Dredgers
Generale Chiodo		Lübecker Maschinenbau-Gesellschaft (Germany)	Generale Chiodo	April 1915	1923	1965	2,700	77,28		Launched for Imperial German Navy as Solthörn (Solthoern); Yard No.130 1,701 GRT/ 990 NRT, 1,500 m^{3} (53,000 cu ft), 2 propellers
Barges
Betta 15		(Italy)	Betta 15 Betta 17		1922; 1923	1955; 1976	316			
Betta 21		(Germany)	Betta 21	1901	1922	1960	300			Launched as DP 6 for Germany Navy
Betta 23		(Germany)	Betta 23 Betta 24		1922 1922	1955 1975	492			

== ROV ==
Model	Origin	Picture	Service	Embarked	Note
Remotely operated underwater vehicles
SMIN MIN Mk2	Italy		12 commissioned in 1992 phase out by 2005/2008	4 Lerici-class minehunters 8 Gaeta-class minehunters	Had replaced Whitehead-Riva Calzoni ROV MIN-77 on 4 Lerici-class minehunters phased out replaced by Gaymarine ROV Pluto GIGAS
SMIN MIN-77	Italy		8 in 1985	4 Lerici-class minehunters	Replaced by SMIN MIN Mk2 on 4 Lerici-class minehunters

== See also ==
- List of active Italian Navy ships
- List of Italian steam frigates
- Italian Navy
