= Italian ship Minerva =

Minerva has been borne by at least three ships of the Italian Navy and may refer to:

- Italian cruiser Minerva, a Partenope-class cruiser launched in 1892 and discarded in 1921.
- Italian corvette Minerva (1942), a Gabbiano-class corvette launched in 1942 and decommissioned in 1970.
- Italian corvette Minerva (F 551), a Minerva-class corvette launched in 1986 and sold in 2015 to Bangladesh for coastguard service. She was renamed CGS Syed Nazrul.
