= Italian corvette Danaide =

Danaide has been borne by at least two ships of the Italian Navy and may refer to:

- Italian corvette Danaide (1942), a Gabbiano-class corvette launched in 1942.
- Italian corvette Danaide (F 553), a Minerva-class corvette launched in 1985 and sold in 2016 to Bangladesh for coastguard service. She was renamed CGS Kamruzzaman.
