= Impetuoso =

Impetuoso may refer to:

- Impetuoso-class destroyer, a class of Italian Navy destroyers
- Italian ship Impetuoso, various Italian naval ships
