= Italian corvette Sfinge =

Sfinge has been borne by at least two ships of the Italian Navy and may refer to:

- Italian corvette Sfinge (1943), a Gabbiano-class corvette launched in 1943.
- Italian corvette Sfinge (F 554), a Minerva-class corvette launched in 1987 and stricken in 2017.
