= Italian ship Impetuoso =

Impetuoso was the name of at least three ships of the Italian Navy and may refer to:

- Italian destroyer Impetuoso (1913), an Indomito-class destroyer launched in 1913 and sunk in 1916.
- Italian torpedo boat Impetuoso, a Ciclone-class torpedo boat launched in 1943 and scuttled later that year.
- Italian destroyer Impetuoso (D 558), an Impetuoso-class destroyer launched in 1956 and decommissioned in 1983.
