= Italian corvette Chimera =

Chimera has been borne by at least two corvettes of the Italian Navy and may refer to:

- Italian corvette Chimera (1943), a Gabbiano-class corvette launched in 1943
- Italian corvette Chimera (F 556), a Minerva-class corvette launched in 1990
