= Indomito =

Indomito may refer to:

- Indomito-class destroyer, a class of Italian Royal Navy destroyers
- Italian ship Indomito, various Italian naval ships
