= Italian corvette Driade =

Driade has been borne by at least two ships of the Italian Navy and may refer to:

- Italian corvette Driade (1942), a Gabbiano-class corvette launched in 1942 and stricken in 1966.
- Italian corvette Driade (F 555), a Minerva-class corvette launched in 1989.
