= Italian ship Anteo =

Two ships of the Italian Navy have been named Anteo:

- Italian landing ship Anteo (A 5306), a 1943 United States Navy tank landing ship, transferred to Italy in 1962 and decommissioned in 1973
- Italian ship Anteo (A 5309), a 1978 submarine rescue ship
