= Italian ship Indomito =

Indomito was the name of at least three ships of the Italian Navy and may refer to:

- Italian destroyer Indomito (1912), an Indomito-class destroyer launched in 1912 and discarded in 1937.
- Italian torpedo boat Indomito, a Ciclone-class torpedo boat launched in 1943. Transferred to Yugoslavia and renamed Triglav in 1949.
- Italian destroyer Indomito (D 559), an Impetuoso-class destroyer launched in 1955 and decommissioned in 1980.
