= Italian corvette Fenice =

Fenice has been borne by at least two ships of the Italian Navy and may refer to:

- Italian corvette Fenice (1943), a Gabbiano-class corvette launched in 1943 and stricken in 1965.
- Italian corvette Fenice (F 557), a Minerva-class corvette launched in 1989 and stricken in 2017.
