= BCGS Nurul Islam =

Bangladesh Coast Guard patrol vessel

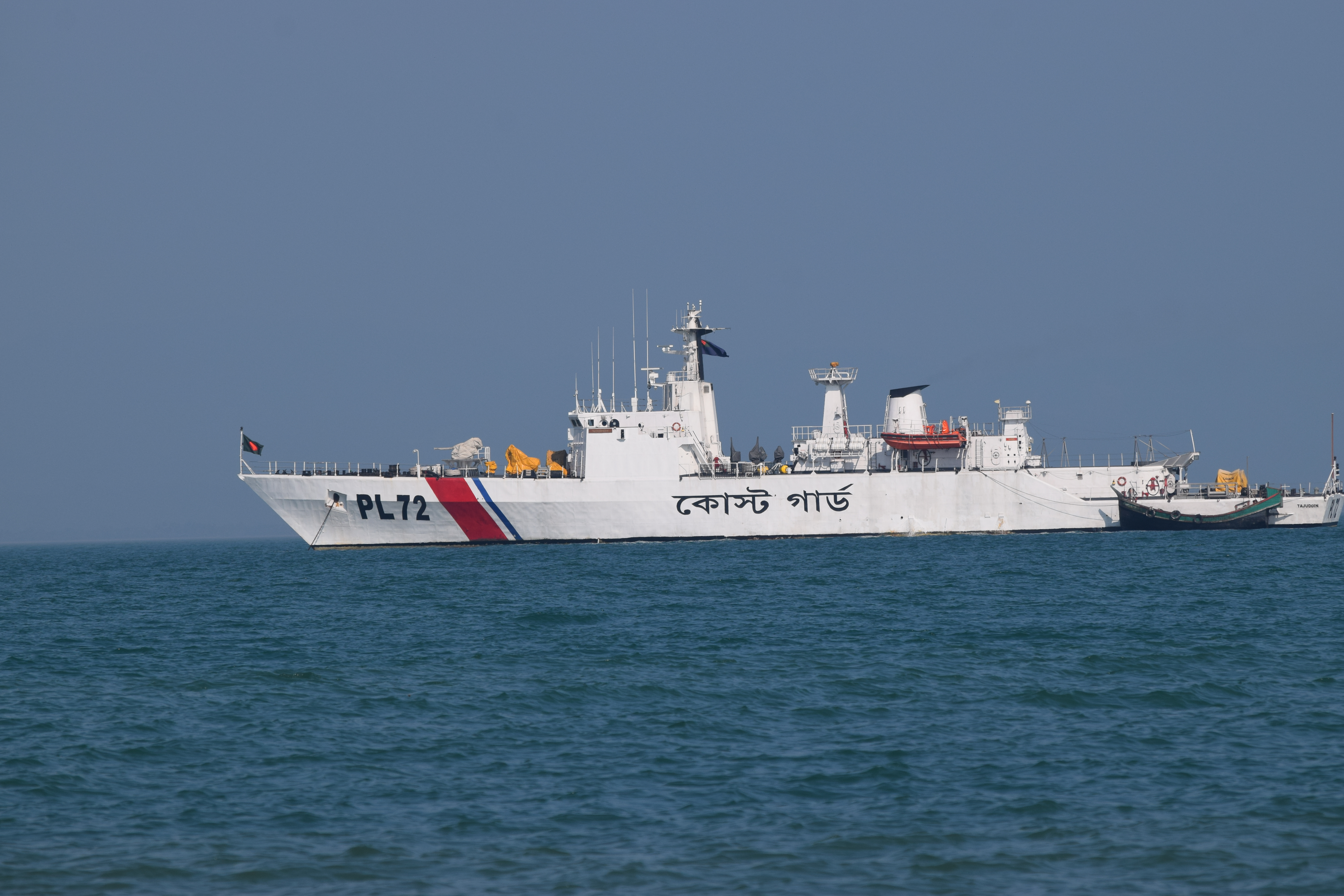

History

Bangladesh
- Name: Nurul Islam
- Builder: Fincantieri
- Laid down: 16 October 1989
- Launched: 15 September 1990
- Acquired: 5 August 2016
- Commissioned: 12 January 2017
- Identification: Pennant number: PL 72; MMSI number: 405000192; Callsign: S3GE
- Status: In active service

General characteristics
- Class & type: Leader-class offshore patrol vessel
- Displacement: 1,285 tonnes
- Length: 87 m (285 ft 5 in)
- Beam: 10.5 m (34 ft 5 in)
- Draught: 3.2 m (10 ft 6 in)
- Depth: 5.5 m (18 ft 1 in)
- Propulsion: 2 × shaft; 2 × Grandi Motori Trieste GMT BM-230.20 DVM diesel engines outputting 11,000 hp (8,200 kW); 4 × Diesel generators Isotta Fraschini ID-36-SS-12V, 2,600 kW (3,500 hp), with Ansaldo MXR 400 M6Z electric generators
- Speed: 25 knots (46 km/h; 29 mph)
- Range: 3,500 nmi (6,500 km; 4,000 mi) at 18 knots (33 km/h; 21 mph)
- Complement: 120 personnel including 7 officers
- Armament: 1 × Oerlikon KBA 25 mm gun; Heavy machine guns; Water cannon

BCGS Nurul Islam is a Leader-class offshore patrol vessel of the Bangladesh Coast Guard. Built in Italy in 1990 as a Minerva-class corvette, Sibilla (F 558), she was purchased from the Italian Navy in 2015 and has been serving the Bangladesh Coast Guard since 2016. The ship is named after sailor Nurul Islam, who was killed in an anti smuggling operation.

== History ==
The ship was laid down on 16 October 1989 by Fincantieri SpA at La Spezia, Italy, and launched at 15 September 1990. She was commissioned to the Italian Navy as an ASW corvette named Sibilla on 16 May 1991. On 28 March 1997, Sibilia was in a collision with the Albanian ship Kateri i Radës in the Strait of Otranto, which sank with the loss of numerous Albanian migrants, an event known as the Tragedy of Otranto. In 2015, she was decommissioned from the Italian Navy and sold to the Bangladesh Coast Guard. The ship went through extensive refitting at Fincantieri, where it was converted to an offshore patrol vessel. All sensors and armaments were removed from the ship and replaced by the Bangladesh Coast Guard requirements.

== Career ==
Nurul Islam was handed over to the Bangladesh Coast Guard on 5 August 2016. She left Italy for Bangladesh on 3 September 2016 and reached Chittagong, Bangladesh on 2 November 2016. She was commissioned to the Bangladesh Coast Guard on 12 January 2017.

Nurul Islam visited India from 7 February to 17 February 2017 on a goodwill mission. She visited the Goa port of India from 7 February to 11 February 2017. During her stay at Goa, the ship participated in 10th Regional Co-operation Agreement (ReCAP) for safe and secure sea 2017 exercise. Then she visited the Chennai Port of India from 14 February to 17 February 2017.

Nurul Islam left Chattogram on 22 May 2018 for a goodwill visit to India. She reached Chennai Port of India on 25 May 2018 and stayed there till 28 May 2018. She then reached the Visakhapatnam Port of India from 29 May 2018. The ship came back home on 4 June 2018.

== See also ==
- List of ships of the Bangladesh Coast Guard
- CGS Syed Nazrul
- CGS Mansoor Ali
- CGS Kamruzzaman
