= BCGS M Humayun Kabir =

Bangladesh Coast Guard patrol vessel

History

Bangladesh
- Name: M Humayun Kabir
- Builder: Fincantieri
- Laid down: 4 April 1985
- Launched: 21 June 1986
- Acquired: 12 October 2017
- Commissioned: 15 November 2020
- Identification: Pennant number: PL 73; MMSI number: 405000220; Callsign: S3GF
- Status: Active

General characteristics
- Class & type: Leader-class offshore patrol vessel
- Displacement: 1,285 tonnes
- Length: 87 m (285 ft 5 in)
- Beam: 10.5 m (34 ft 5 in)
- Draught: 3.2 m (10 ft 6 in)
- Depth: 5.5 m (18 ft 1 in)
- Propulsion: 2 × shaft; 2 × diesel engines Grandi Motori Trieste GMT BM-230.20 DVM outputting 11,000 hp (8,200 kW); 4 × diesel generators Isotta Fraschini ID-36-SS-12V, 2.600 kW (3.487 hp), with Ansaldo MXR 400 M6Z electric generators
- Speed: 25 knots (46 km/h; 29 mph)
- Range: 3,500 nmi (6,500 km; 4,000 mi) at 18 knots (33 km/h; 21 mph)
- Complement: 120 personnel including 7 officers
- Armament: 1 × Oerlikon KBA 25 mm gun; Heavy machine guns

BCGS M Humayun Kabir is a Leader-class offshore patrol vessel of the Bangladesh Coast Guard. BCGS M Humayun Kabir entered service in 2020. The ship is named after M Humayun Kabir, a sailor who was killed in action while fighting against pirates in Sundarban.

== History ==
The ship was laid down on 4 April 1985 by Fincantieri and launched on 21 June 1986. She was commissioned into the Italian Navy as an anti-submarine warfare corvette named Urania (F 552) on 1 June 1987. On 10 March 2016, Urania was decommissioned from the Italian Navy and sold to the Bangladesh Coast Guard. The ship went through an extensive refit at Fincantieri where the vessel was converted to an offshore patrol vessel. All sensors and armaments were removed from the ship and replaced by those meeting Bangladesh Coast Guard requirements.

== Career ==
The ship was handed over to the Bangladesh Coast Guard on 12 October 2017. She reached the port of Mongla on 21 December 2017. She was commissioned to the Bangladesh Coast Guard on 15 November 2020.

== See also ==
- List of ships of the Bangladesh Coast Guard
- BCGS Firaz Kabir
- BCGS Nurul Islam
- CGS Kamruzzaman
