= BCGS Firaz Kabir =

Bangladesh Coast Guard patrol vessel

History

Bangladesh
- Name: BCGS Firaz Kabir
- Builder: Fincantieri
- Laid down: 11 March 1985
- Launched: 3 April 1986
- Acquired: 5 August 2016
- Commissioned: 12 January 2017
- Identification: Pennant number: PL 71; MMSI number: 405000191; Callsign: S3GD
- Status: In active service

General characteristics
- Class & type: Leader Class
- Displacement: 1,285 tonnes
- Length: 87 m (285 ft)
- Beam: 10.5 m (34 ft)
- Draught: 3.2 m (10 ft)
- Depth: 5.5 m (18 ft)
- Propulsion: 2 x shaft; 2 x Diesel engines Grandi Motori Trieste GMT BM-230.20 DVM outputting 11.000 hp (8.203 kW); 4 x diesel engine generators Isotta Fraschini ID-36-SS-12V, 2.600 kW (3.487 hp), with Ansaldo MXR 400 M6Z electric generators
- Speed: 25 knots (46 km/h; 29 mph)
- Range: 3,500 nmi (6,500 km; 4,000 mi) at 18 knots (33 km/h; 21 mph)
- Armament: 1 x Oerlikon KBA 25mm gun; Heavy machine guns; Water cannon

BCGS Firaz Kabir is a Leader Class offshore patrol vessel of the Bangladesh Coast Guard. She is serving the Bangladesh Coast Guard since 2017. The ship is named after a lieutenant commander of Bangladesh Navy, who was killed in a Nor'westers.

== History ==
The ship was laid down on 11 March 1985 at Fincantieri and launched at 3 April 1986. She was commissioned to the Italian Navy as an ASW corvette named Minerva (F 551) at 10 June 1987. In 2015, she was decommissioned from the Italian Navy and sold to the Bangladesh Coast Guard. The ship went through extensive refitting at Fincantieri, where it was converted to an offshore patrol vessel. All sensors and armaments were removed from the ship and replaced by the Bangladesh Coast Guard requirements.

== Career ==
Firaz Kabir was handed over to the Bangladesh Coast Guard on 5 August 2016. She left Italy for Bangladesh on 3 September 2016 and reached Chittagong, Bangladesh on 2 November 2016. She was commissioned to the Bangladesh Coast Guard on 12 January 2017.

Firaz Kabir participated in Langkawi International Maritime and Aerospace Exhibition (LIMA)-2019, held between 26 and 30 March. She left Chattogram to take part in the event on 18 March 2019. During the tour, she also visited Port Blair, India and Phuket port, Thailand on a goodwill mission.

== See also ==
- List of ships of the Bangladesh Coast Guard
- BCGS Nurul Islam
- CGS Mansoor Ali
- CGS Kamruzzaman
