= List of Italian steam frigates =

This is a list of Italian steam frigates of the period 1853-63:
Several vessels were renamed on entry to the Italian Navy.

Screw frigates

Unknown region

- Principe di Carignano 22 1742t

Sardinian

- Carlo Alberto 57 (1853) 3231t
- Vittorio Emanuele 47 (1856) 3201t
- Maria Adelaide 51 (1859) 3429t
- Duca di Genova 50 (1860) 1860t
- Principe Umberto 54 3446t

Neapolitan

- Borbone 46 (1860) - Renamed “Garibaldi” 3390t
- Farnese 54 - Renamed Italia 6058t
- Gaeta 54 3917t

== Bibliography ==
- Fraccaroli, Aldo (1979). "Italy". In Chesneau, Roger & Kolesnik, Eugene M. (eds.). Conway's All the World's Fighting Ships 1860–1905. New York: Mayflower Books. pp. 334–359. ISBN 0-8317-0302-4.
