= USS Alameda County =

1943 LST-1-class tank landing ship

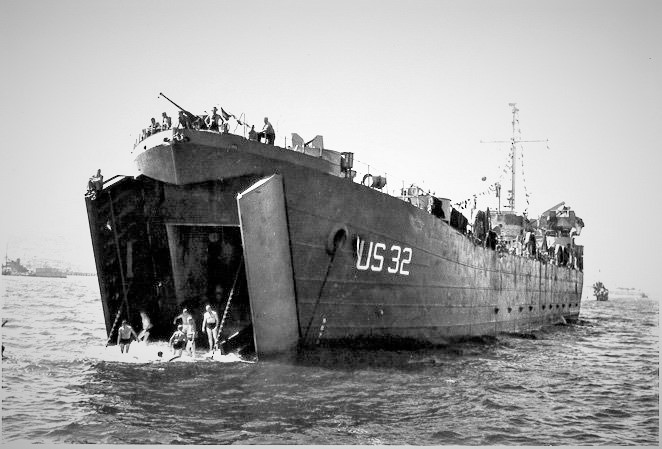
- LST-32, crew swim call, date and location unknown

History

United States
- Name: LST-32 (1943–1955); Alameda County (1955–1962)
- Namesake: Alameda County, California
- Builder: Dravo Corporation, Pittsburgh, Pennsylvania
- Laid down: 17 February 1943
- Launched: 22 May 1943
- Sponsored by: Miss Dorothy M. Manko
- Commissioned: 3 July 1943, reduced commission; 12 July 1943, full commission
- Decommissioned: July 1946
- Identification: Hull symbol: LST-29; Code letters: NZCW
- Honors and awards: 2 × battle stars Laid up in the Atlantic Reserve Fleet, Green Cove Springs Group, Florida
- Recommissioned: 7 March 1951
- Decommissioned: 1 September 1962
- Renamed: Alameda County, 1 July 1955
- Reclassified: AVB-1 (Advance Aviation Base Ship), 28 September 1957
- Stricken: 30 June 1962
- Identification: Hull symbol: AVB-1
- Fate: Transferred to Italy, 20 November 1962
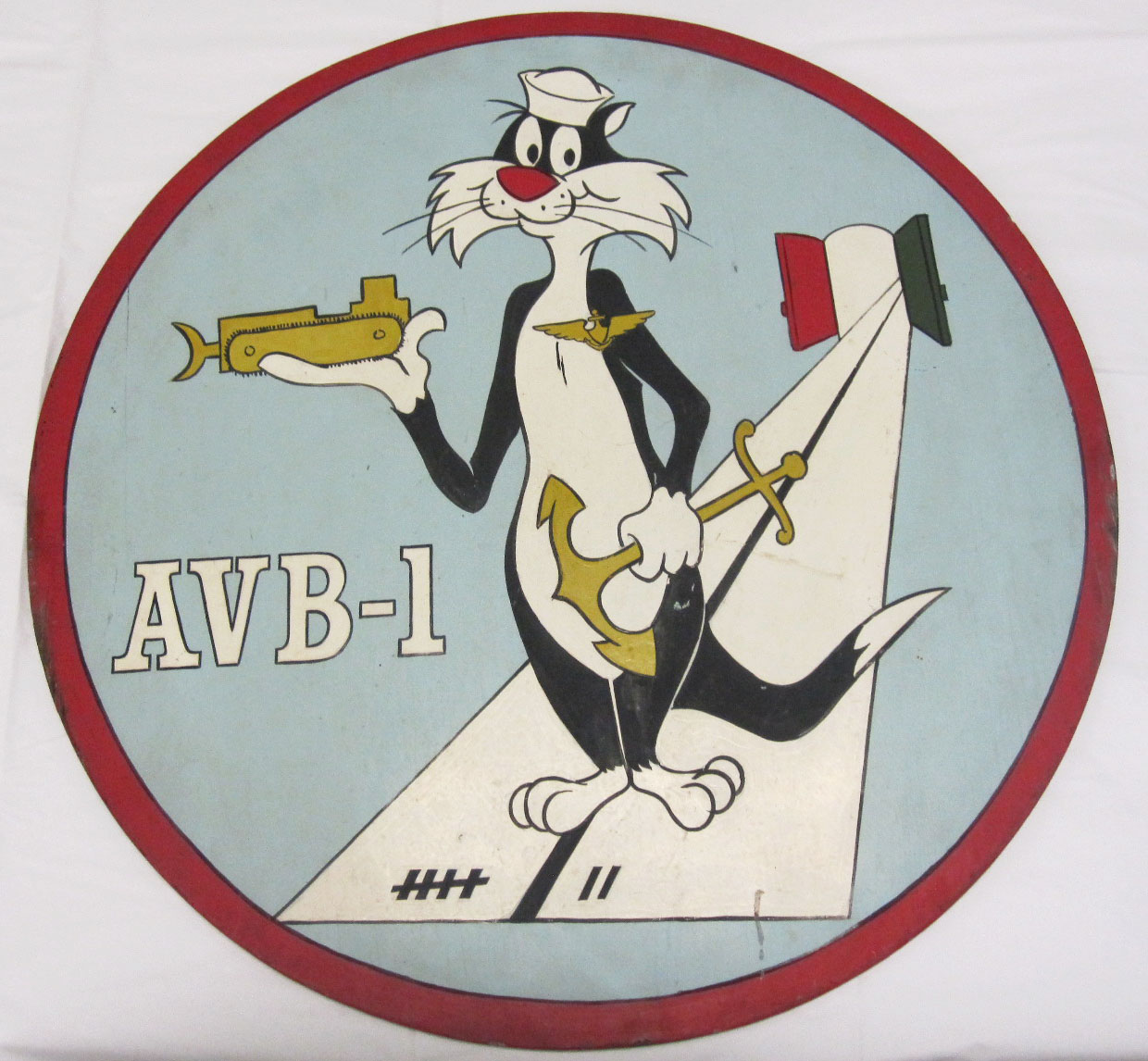
- Badge

Italy
- Name: Anteo
- Acquired: 20 November 1962
- Decommissioned: 1 August 1973
- Identification: Hull symbol: A5306
- Fate: Stricken 1974

General characteristics
- Type: LST-1-class tank landing ship
- Displacement: 4,080 long tons (4,145 t) full load; 2,160 long tons (2,190 t) landing
- Length: 328 ft (100 m) oa
- Beam: 50 ft (15 m)
- Draft: Full load: 8 ft 2 in (2.49 m) forward; 14 ft 1 in (4.29 m) aft; Landing at 2,160 t: 3 ft 11 in (1.19 m) forward; 9 ft 10 in (3.00 m) aft
- Installed power: 2 × 900 hp (670 kW) Electro-Motive Diesel 12-567A diesel engines; 1,700 shp (1,300 kW)
- Propulsion: 1 × Falk main reduction gears; 2 × Propellers
- Speed: 12 kn (22 km/h; 14 mph)
- Range: 24,000 nmi (44,000 km; 28,000 mi) at 9 kn (17 km/h; 10 mph) while displacing 3,960 long tons (4,024 t)
- Boats & landing craft carried: 2 or 6 x LCVPs
- Capacity: 2,100 tons oceangoing maximum; 350 tons main deckload
- Troops: 16 officers, 147 enlisted men
- Complement: 13 officers, 104 enlisted men
- Armament: Varied, ultimate armament; 2 × twin 40 mm (1.57 in) Bofors guns; 4 × single 40 mm Bofors guns; 12 × 20 mm (0.79 in) Oerlikon cannons

Service record
- Operations: Invasion of Southern France (15 August–21 September 1944)
- Awards: American Campaign Medal; European–African–Middle Eastern Campaign Medal; World War II Victory Medal; Navy Occupation Service Medal w/Europe Clasp; National Defense Service Medal

USS Alameda County (LST-32) was an LST-1-class tank landing ship built for the United States Navy during World War II. Like many of her class, she was not originally named, and only referenced by her hull designation. Later she was named for Alameda County, California, the only US Naval vessel to bear the name.

== Construction ==
LST-32 was laid down on 17 February 1943, at Pittsburgh, Pennsylvania, by the Dravo Corporation; launched on 22 May 1943; sponsored by Miss Dorothy M. Manko; and commissioned on 12 July 1943.

== Service history ==
After commissioning, LST-32 served as a training platform in Chesapeake Bay, until March 1944, when she crossed the Atlantic Ocean and entered the Mediterranean Sea. On 1 April, while proceeding in a convoy from the Algerian coast to the island of Mallorca, she and her consorts endured a low level attack by a formation of three German twin-engine bombers. Antiaircraft fire splashed one of them and drove off the other two. The ship operated into the summer with the task group that resupplied the Anzio beachhead. Early in August, she prepared for the invasion of southern France, and, during the landings on 15 August, was among the LSTs off the Îles d'Hyères as senior radar ship. She sent two separate radar units ashore on Port Cros, one on 15 August, and the second on the following day.

LST-32 spent the next 10 months carrying supplies and munitions between various ports in the Mediterranean. In January 1945, she lifted British troops to Greece to help suppress a communist attempt to take over the government. On the return trip, the vessel rescued about 100 survivors from the Greek ship SS Ionia wrecked in a storm. She later transported prisoners, elements of the French Foreign Legion, railroad cars, and other vehicles between ports in Italy, France, and North Africa, before returning to the United States at New York, in July 1945. The ship then moved to Norfolk, to undergo repairs and alterations preparatory to her transfer to the war in the Pacific. However, the Japanese capitulation in mid-August caused both alterations and reassignment to be cancelled. Instead, LST-32 remained in the Atlantic Fleet until July 1946, when she was decommissioned and placed in reserve at Green Cove Springs, Florida.

== Post-war service ==
Reactivated as a part of the Navy's expansion of its active fleet following the communist invasion of South Korea, the ship was recommissioned on 7 March 1951 and operated with the Atlantic Fleet Amphibious Force until reassigned to the Atlantic Fleet Naval Air Force in April 1953. By September, she was operating out of Naples, Italy, serving as an advanced base support ship with Air Logistics Support Division 2. With the exception of occasional voyages to the United States for alterations and repairs, LST-32 operated in the Mediterranean Sea for the remainder of her active Navy career providing the 6th Fleet with the capability of establishing forward NATO air bases anywhere in the Mediterranean on short notice. On 1 July 1955, she received the name Alameda County.

Most of her missions consisted of training evolutions and exercises, but once she had the opportunity to put all that practice to use. Late in October 1956, Israel, Britain, and France retaliated against Egypt after the latter country had seized the Suez Canal. In response to the crisis, Alameda County moved to Suda Bay, Crete, and had an emergency air base in operation by 22 November. From then until 4 December, she staged United Nations forces into the troubled area while evacuating Americans and other foreign nationals. Soon thereafter, she resumed normal operations out of Naples.

On 28 September 1957, the ship was redesignated Advance Aviation Base Ship AVB-1. In July 1958, Alameda County again demonstrated her capabilities when United States Marine Corps forces landed in Lebanon, to help stabilize the volatile situation in that country. She returned to Suda Bay, on 14 July, and spent the next three months housing, feeding, rearming, and refuelling the air squadrons flying support missions for the marines in Beirut. The landing force departed Lebanon in October, and Alameda County resumed her drills and exercises put of Naples.

On 25 June 1962, Alameda County was decommissioned at Naples; and her name was struck from the Naval Vessel Register on 30 June 1962.

== Anteo (A 5306) ==
She was sold to the government of Italy on 20 November 1962. She served the Italian Navy as Anteo (A 5306) into the mid-1980s. Her final fate is unknown.

== Awards ==
LST-32 earned two battle stars for her World War II service.

== Gallery ==
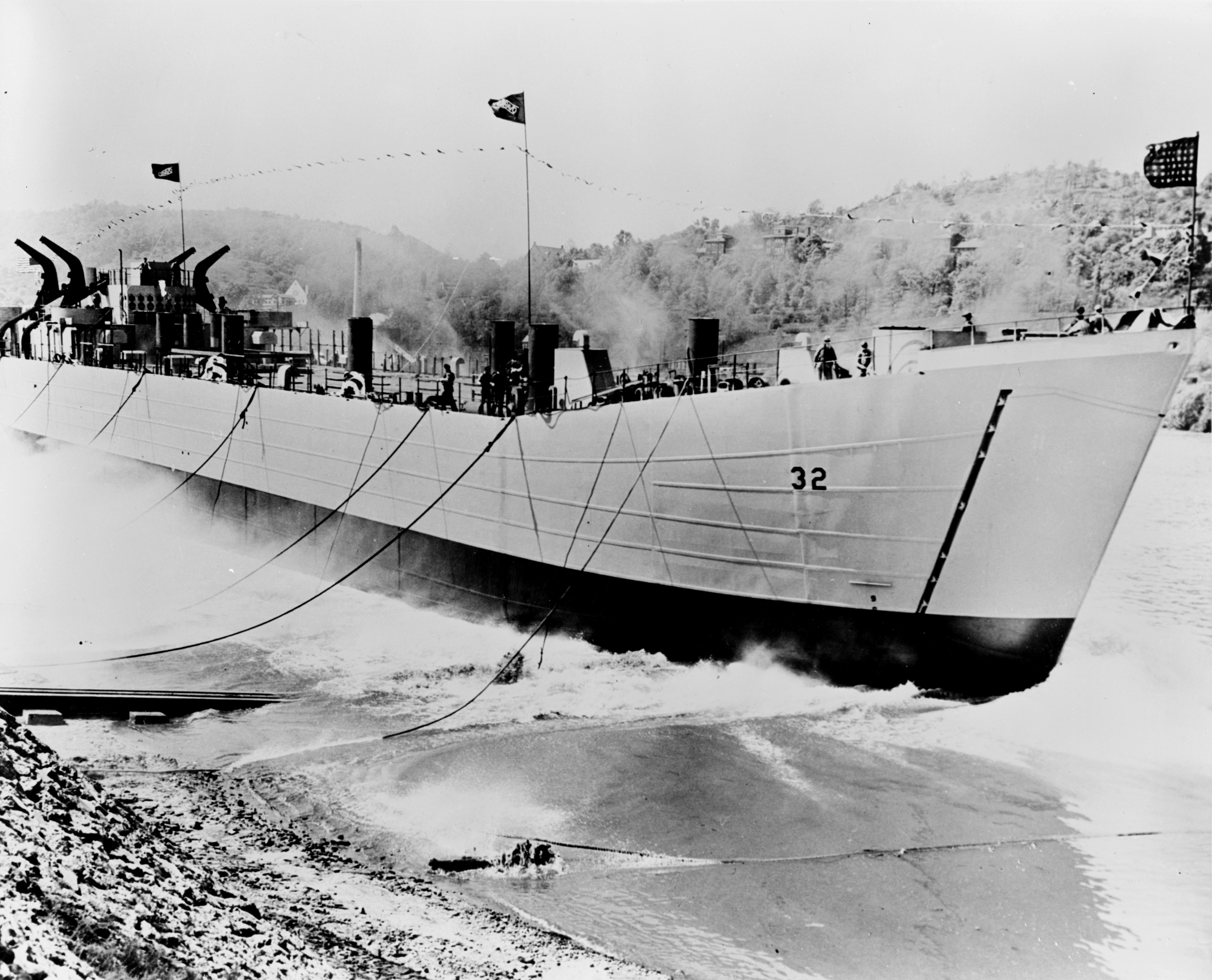
Launch of LST-32, 22 May 1943

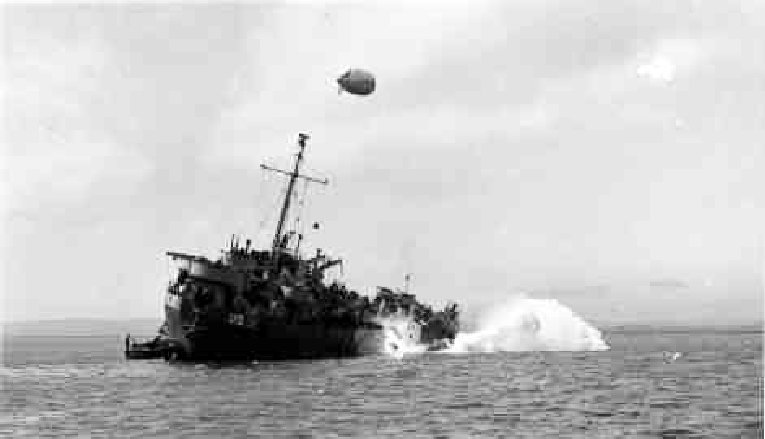
LST-32, launching an LCT, date and location unknown

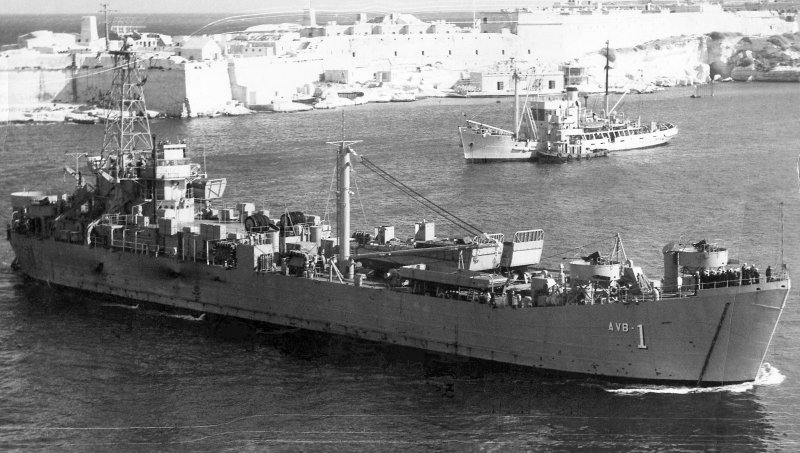
USS Alameda County (AVB-1) entering the Grand Harbour at Valletta, Malta in 1960

== Bibliography ==
- "LST-32". Dictionary of American Naval Fighting Ships. Naval History and Heritage Command. 30 July 2015. This article incorporates text from this source, which is in the public domain.
- "Alameda County". Dictionary of American Naval Fighting Ships. Naval History and Heritage Command. 11 June 2015. This article incorporates text from this source, which is in the public domain.
- "USS LST-32". NavSource. 20 March 2015.
