= Italian destroyer Indomito (D 559) =

Impetuoso-class destroyer

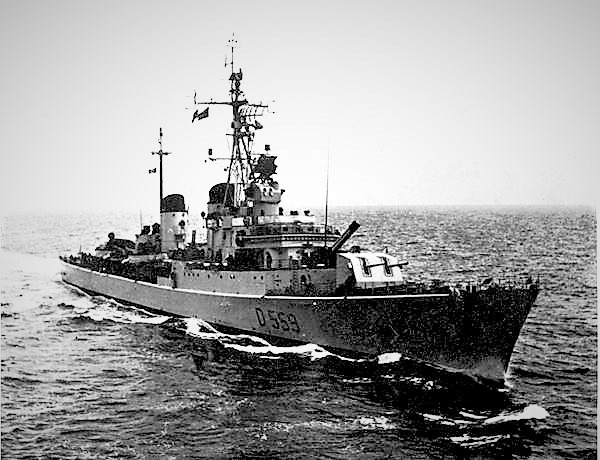
- Indomito underway, date unknown.

History

Italy
- Name: Indomito
- Namesake: Indomito
- Ordered: February 1950
- Builder: Ansaldo Stabilimento Luigi Orlando, Livorno
- Laid down: 24 April 1952
- Launched: 9 August 1955
- Commissioned: 23 February 1958
- Decommissioned: November 1980
- Identification: Pennant number: D 559
- Fate: Scrapped

General characteristics
- Class & type: Impetuoso-class destroyer
- Displacement: 2,775 tons standard; 3,810 tons full load
- Length: 127.6 m (418 ft 8 in)
- Beam: 13.2 m (43 ft 4 in)
- Draught: 4.5 m (14 ft 9 in)
- Propulsion: 2 shaft geared turbines; 4 × Foster Wheeler boilers providing 65,000 hp (48,000 kW)
- Speed: 34 knots (63 km/h; 39 mph)
- Range: 3,000 nmi (5,600 km; 3,500 mi) at 16 kn (30 km/h; 18 mph)
- Complement: 315
- Armament: 2 × twin 127 mm/38 calibre gun; 2 × quad Bofors 40 mm guns; 4 × twin Bofors 40 mm guns; 2 × 533 mm double torpedo launchers

Indomito (D 559) was the second ship of the Impetuoso-class destroyers of the Italian Navy.

== Development ==
The Impetuoso class were ordered by the Italian Navy in February 1950. They were based on Commandante hull design. The class had similar characteristics to the Gearing-class destroyers.

== Construction and career ==
She was laid down on 24 April 1952 and launched on 9 August 1955 by Cantiere navale fratelli Orlando. Commissioned on 23 February 1958 with the hull number D 559 and decommissioned in November 1980.

== Gallery ==
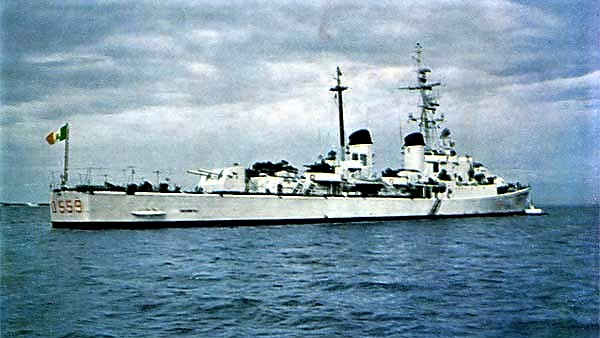
Indomito anchored, date unknown.

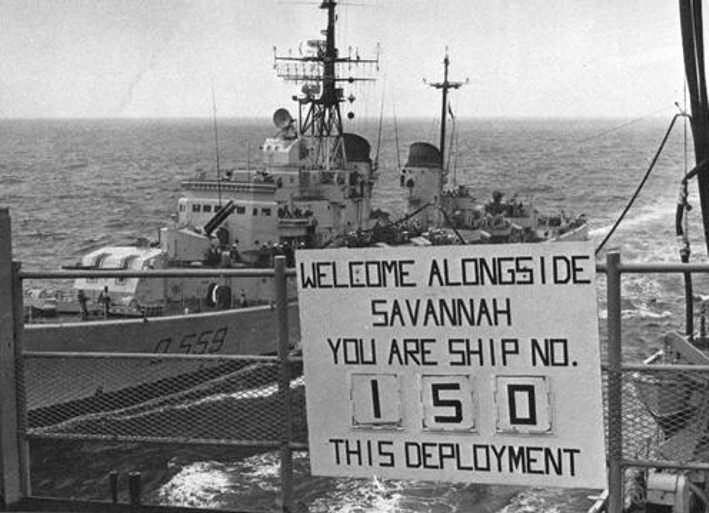
Indomito coming alongside USS Savannah in the Mediterranean Sea in 1974.
