= Italian destroyer Impetuoso (D 558) =

Impetuoso-class destroyer

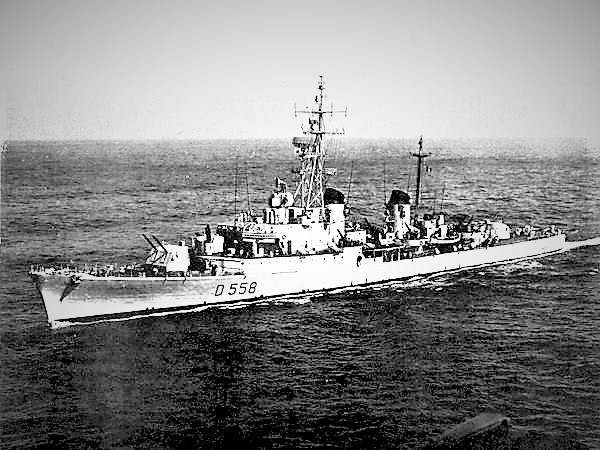
- Impetuoso underway, date unknown.

History

Italy
- Name: Impetuoso
- Namesake: Impetuoso
- Ordered: February 1950
- Builder: Cantiere navale di Riva Trigoso
- Laid down: 7 May 1952
- Launched: 16 September 1956
- Commissioned: 25 January 1958
- Decommissioned: 1983
- Identification: Pennant number: D 558
- Fate: Scrapped

General characteristics
- Class & type: Impetuoso-class destroyer
- Displacement: 2,775 tons standard; 3,810 tons full load
- Length: 127.6 m (418 ft 8 in)
- Beam: 13.2 m (43 ft 4 in)
- Draught: 4.5 m (14 ft 9 in)
- Propulsion: 2 shaft geared turbines; 4 × Foster Wheeler boilers providing 65,000 hp (48,000 kW)
- Speed: 34 knots (63 km/h; 39 mph)
- Range: 3,000 nmi (5,600 km; 3,500 mi) at 16 kn (30 km/h; 18 mph)
- Complement: 315
- Armament: 2 × twin 127 mm/38 calibre gun; 2 × quad Bofors 40 mm guns; 4 × twin Bofors 40 mm guns; 2 × 533 mm double torpedo launchers

Impetuoso (D 558) was the lead ship of the Impetuoso-class destroyers of the Italian Navy.

== Development ==
The Impetuoso class were ordered by the Italian Navy in February 1950. They were based on Commandante hull design. The class had similar characteristics to the Gearing-class destroyers.

== Construction and career ==
She was laid down on 7 May 1952 and launched on 16 September 1956 by Cantiere navale di Riva Trigoso. The ship was commissioned on 25 January 1958 with the hull number D 558 and decommissioned in 1983.

== Gallery ==
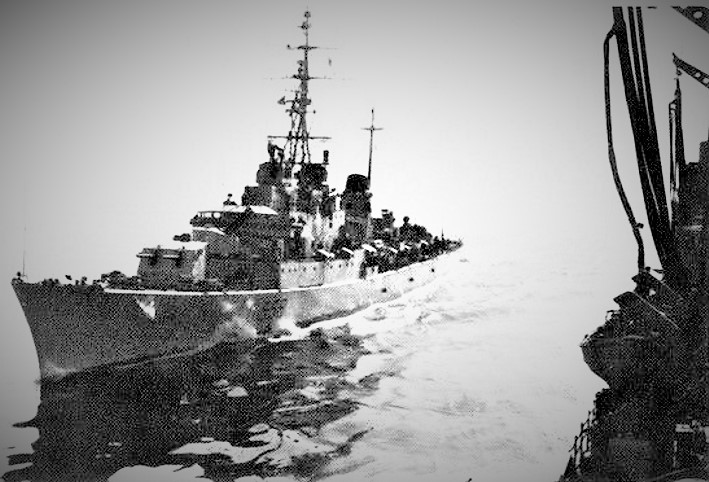
Impetuoso coming alongside USS Kalamazoo in the Mediterranean Sea in June 1977.

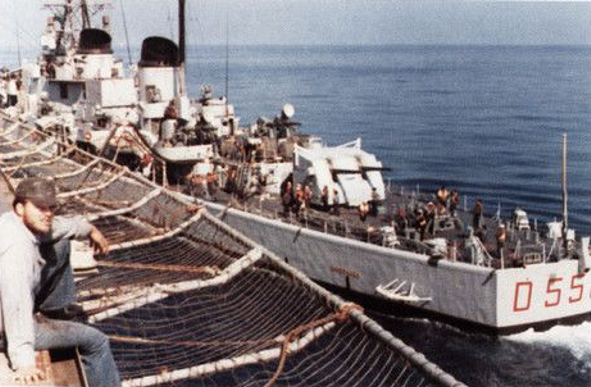
Impetuoso coming alongside USS Kalamazoo in the Mediterranean Sea in June 1977.
