= Impetuoso-class destroyer =

Italian Navy ship class

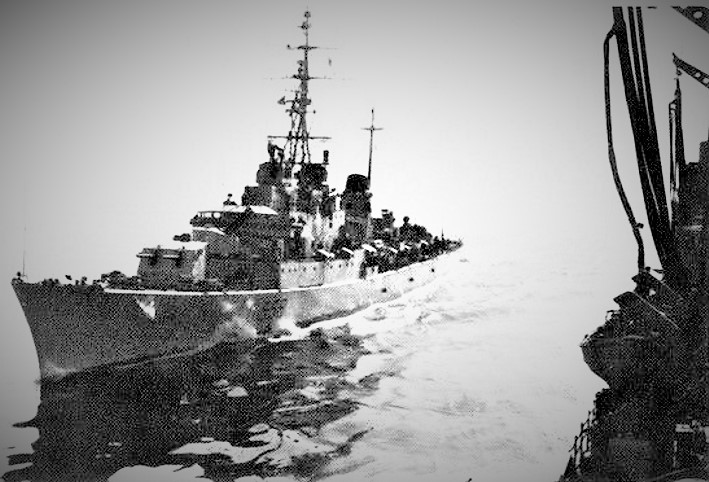
- Impetuoso alongside USS Kalamazoo in the Mediterranean Sea in June 1977

Class overview
- Name: Impetuoso class
- Builders: Cantiere navale di Riva Trigoso; Cantiere navale fratelli Orlando
- Operators: Italian Navy
- Preceded by: San Giorgio class
- Succeeded by: Impavido class
- Built: 1952–1958
- In commission: 1958–1983
- Completed: 2
- Retired: 2

General characteristics
- Type: Destroyer
- Displacement: 2,775 tons standard; 3,810 tons full load
- Length: 127.6 m (418 ft 8 in)
- Beam: 13.2 m (43 ft 4 in)
- Draught: 4.5 m (14 ft 9 in)
- Propulsion: 2 shaft geared turbines; 4 × Foster Wheeler boilers providing 65,000 hp (48,000 kW)
- Speed: 34 knots (63 km/h; 39 mph)
- Range: 3,000 nmi (5,600 km; 3,500 mi) at 16 kn (30 km/h; 18 mph)
- Complement: 315
- Sensors & processing systems: SPS-6 air-search radar; SG-6B surface-search radar; SPG-25 and SPG-34 fire control radar; SQS-4 search sonar
- Electronic warfare & decoys: WLR-1 ESM (only Impetuoso by 1980)
- Armament: 2 × twin 127 mm/38 caliber gun; 2 × quad Bofors 40 mm/60 guns; 4 × twin Bofors 40 mm/60 guns; 1 × 305 mm Menon ASW mortar; 2 × triple 12.75-inch (324 mm) torpedo launchers with Mark 44 torpedoes

The Impetuoso class were the first post-World War II destroyers built for the Italian Navy. The two ships were ordered in February 1950, entered service in 1958 and were retired in the early 1980s.

== Design ==
The Impetuoso class hull design was based on the uncompleted World War II Comandanti Medaglie d'Oro-class destroyer. The class has a length of 127.6 m (419 ft) with length between perpendiculars of 123.4 m (405 ft), a beam of 13.2 m (43 ft), with a draught of 4.5 m (15 ft), and their displacement were 2,775 long tons (2,820 t) standard and 3,810 long tons (3,870 t) at full load. The ships was powered by two-shaft geared steam turbines with four Foster Wheeler boilers, with total power output of 65,000 shaft horsepower (48 MW). Impetuoso class has a maximum speed of 34 knots (63 km/h), with range of 3,000 nautical miles (5,600 km) while cruising at 16 knots (30 km/h). The ships has a complement of 315 personnel.

The class were armed with four 5-inch (127 mm)/38 caliber guns in two twin-gun turrets, 16 Bofors 40 mm/60 guns consisted of two quad-mounts and four twin-mounts, and one 305 mm Menon anti-submarine mortar. They were also armed with two fixed 533-millimetre (21 in) torpedo tubes, which was later replaced by two 12.75-inch (324 mm) triple-tubes with Mark 44 torpedoes. There was a proposed modernization program in the late 1960s for the ships to be rearmed with a single lightweight 5"/54 caliber Mark 45 gun forward and RIM-24 Tartar surface-to-air missile launcher in the aft.

The ships electronics and sensors consisted of SPS-6 air-search radar, SG-6B surface-search radar, SPG-25 and SPG-34 fire control radar, and SQS-11 search sonar, which was later replaced with SQS-4 sonar. As of 1980, Impetuoso was equipped with WLR-1 electronic support measure system with noise jammer, while Indomito appears to be not equipped with any electronic warfare system.

== Ships ==
Name	Pennant number	Builder	Laid down	Launched	Commissioned	Fate
Impetuoso	D 558	CNR, Riva Trigoso	7 May 1952	16 September 1956	25 January 1958	Stricken 1983
Indomito	D 559	Ansaldo, Livorno	24 April 1952	9 August 1955	23 February 1958	Stricken 3 November 1980

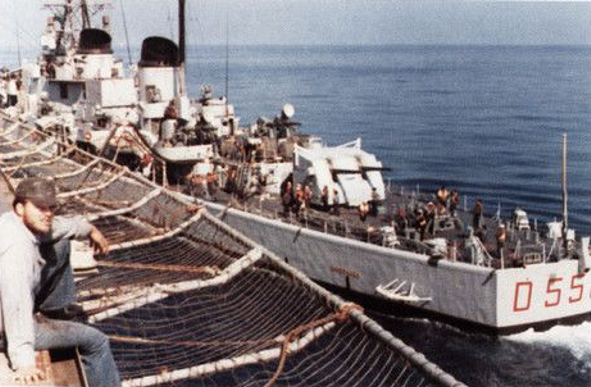
Aft view of Impetuoso in May 1977

== See also ==
- List of destroyers of Italy

Equivalent destroyers of the same era

- T 47 class
- Daring class
- Akizuki class
- Friesland class
- Halland class
- Forrest Sherman class
- Kotlin class
- Hamburg class

== Bibliography ==
- Gardiner, Robert; Chumbley, Stephen, eds. (1995). Conway's All the World's Fighting Ships 1947–1995. Annapolis, Maryland, USA: Naval Institute Press. ISBN 1-55750-132-7.
