= CGS Kamaruzzaman =

Bangladesh Coast Guard patrol vessel

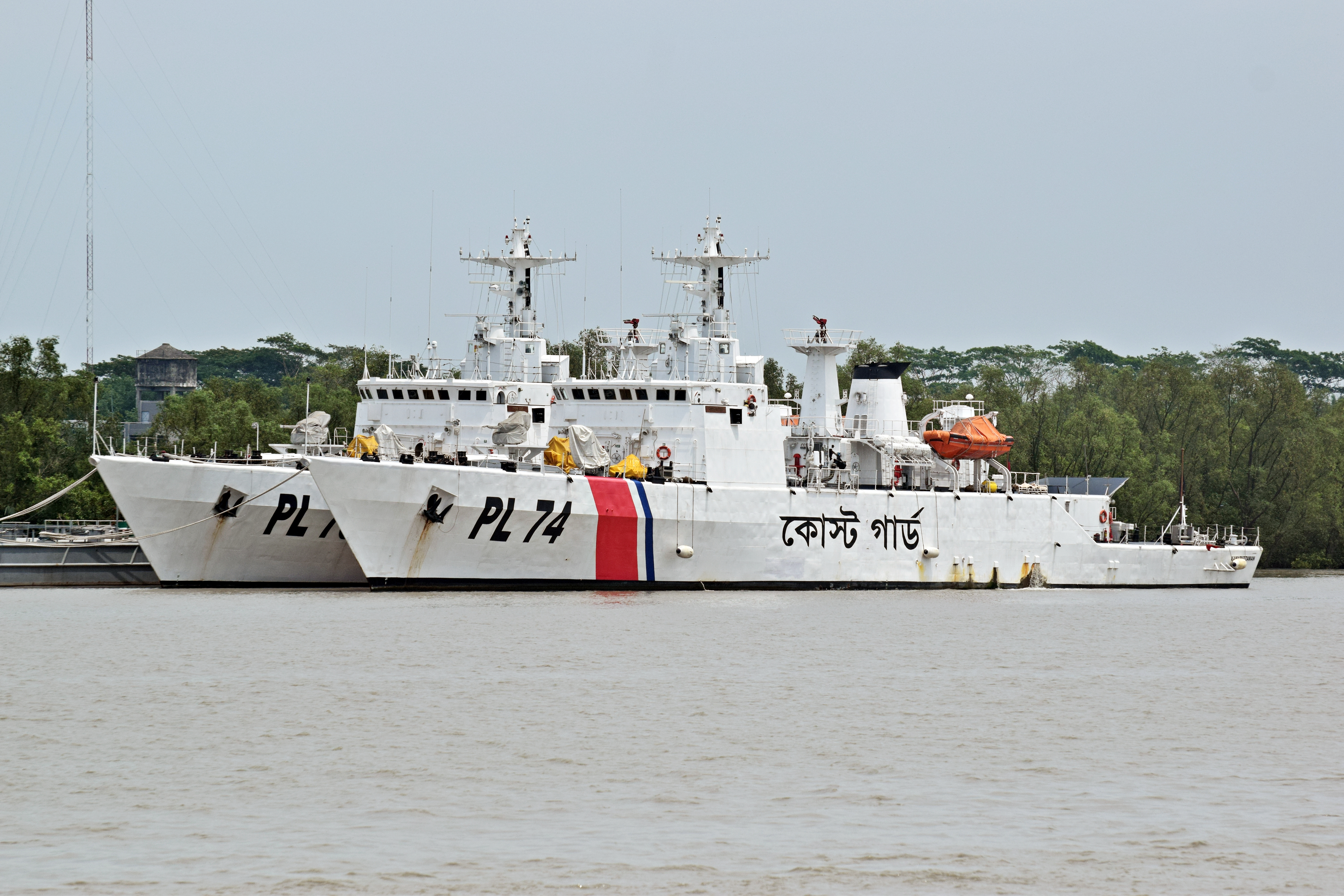

History
- Name: CGS Kamaruzzaman
- Builder: Fincantieri
- Laid down: 26 June 1985
- Launched: 18 October 1986
- Acquired: 12 October 2017
- Commissioned: 15 November 2020
- Identification: Pennant number: PL 74; MMSI number: 405000221; Callsign: S3GG
- Status: Active

General characteristics
- Class & type: Leader-class offshore patrol vessel
- Displacement: 1,285 tonnes
- Length: 87 m (285 ft)
- Beam: 10.5 m (34 ft)
- Draught: 3.2 m (10 ft)
- Depth: 5.5 m (18 ft)
- Propulsion: 2 × shaft; 2 × diesel engines Grandi Motori Trieste GMT BM-230.20 DVM outputting 11.000 hp (8.203 kW); 4 × diesel engine generators Isotta Fraschini ID-36-SS-12V, 2.600 kW (3.487 hp), with Ansaldo MXR 400 M6Z electric generators
- Speed: 25 knots (46 km/h; 29 mph)
- Range: 3,500 nmi (6,500 km; 4,000 mi) at 18 knots (33 km/h; 21 mph)
- Complement: 120 personnel including 7 officers
- Armament: 1 x Oerlikon KBA 25mm gun; Heavy machine guns; Water cannon

CGS Kamaruzzaman is a Leader-class offshore patrol vessel of the Bangladesh Coast Guard. She is serving the Bangladesh Coast Guard since 2020.

== History ==
The ship was laid down on 26 June 1985 at Fincantieri and launched on 18 October 1986. She was commissioned to the Italian Navy as an anti-submarine warfare (ASW) corvette named Danaide (F 553) on 9 September 1987. On 10 March 2016, she was decommissioned from the Italian Navy and sold to the Bangladesh Coast Guard. The ship underwent an extensive refitting at Fincantieri where the vessel was converted to an offshore patrol vessel. All sensors and armaments were removed from the ship and replaced by those that met Bangladesh Coast Guard requirements.

== Career ==
The ship was handed over to the Bangladesh Coast Guard on 12 October 2017. She reached the port of Mongla on 21 December 2017. She was commissioned to the Bangladesh Coast Guard on 15 November 2020.

== See also ==
- List of ships of the Bangladesh Coast Guard
