= Minerva-class corvette =

Italian naval ship class

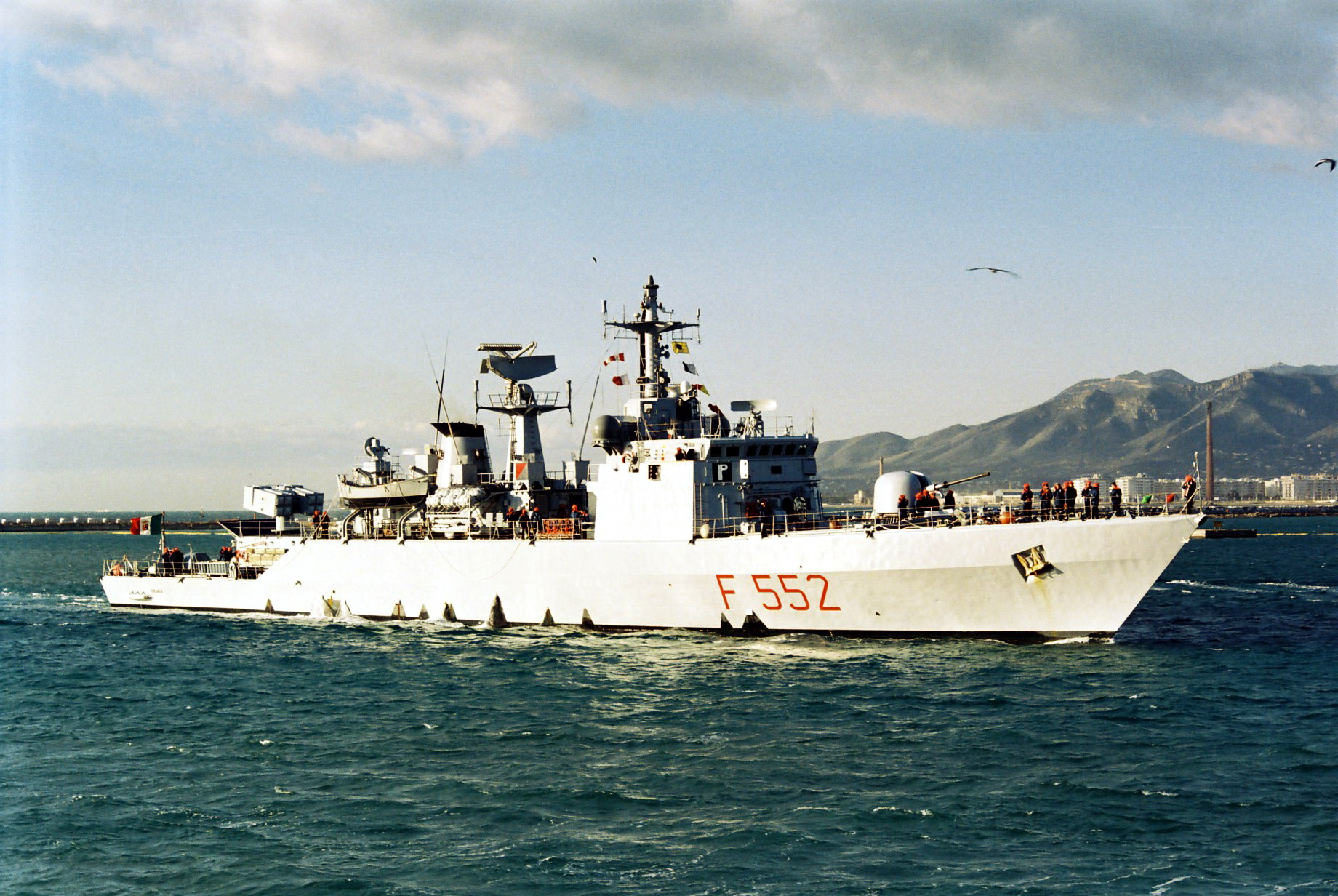
- Urania at Málaga in 2001

Class overview
- Name: Minerva class
- Builders: Fincantieri
- Operators: Italian Navy (retired); Bangladesh Coast Guard (active)
- In commission: 1987
- Completed: 8
- Active: 4 (as OPV)
- Retired: 4

General characteristics
- Type: Corvette
- Displacement: 1,285 t (1,265 long tons) full load
- Length: 87 m (285 ft) LOA
- Beam: 10.5 m (34 ft)
- Draught: 3.2–4.8 m (10–16 ft)
- Depth: 5.5 m (18 ft)
- Propulsion: - 2 x shaft; - 2 x Diesel engines Grandi Motori Trieste GMT BM-230.20 DVM outputting 11.000 hp (8.203 kW); - 4 x diesel engine generators Isotta Fraschini ID-36-SS-12V, 2.600 kW (3.487 hp), with Ansaldo MXR 400 M6Z electric generators
- Speed: 25 knots (46 km/h; 29 mph)
- Range: 3,500 nmi (6,500 km; 4,000 mi) at 18 knots (33 km/h; 21 mph)
- Complement: 7 officers, 113 enlisted
- Sensors & processing systems: - 1 x Selenia AA/ASu-Radar SPS-774 (RAN 10S) E/F Band; - 1 x SMA SPS-728 Navigation radar; - 1 x Selenia Fire control SPG-75 (RTN 30X) for Albatros and 76mm; - 1 x Sonar Raythron/Elsag DE-1167; - CMS Selenia IPN-10 (Mini-SADOC), Link 11; - ASW AN/SLQ-25 Nixie
- Electronic warfare & decoys: - ESM/ECM Selenia SLQ-747 (INS-3); - 2 x Wallop Defence Systems Barricade decoy launchers
- Armament: - 1 x OTO Melara 76 mm Gun; - 2 x OTO Melara 25/80 guns with Oerlikon KBA 25mm; - 1 x Sea Sparrow or Selenia Aspide in an 8-cell launcher; - 2 × triple 324 mm TLS ASW torpedoes; - 4 heavy machine guns

The Minerva class is a series of corvettes of the Italian Navy. They were built in two batches of four units during the 1980s and 1990s. The ships have fairly good speed and armament, including a 76 mm general-purpose gun, but, due to their emphasis on anti-submarine warfare, they lack anti-ship missile capabilities. These units are designed to operate in coastal areas. Their main missions include sea policing, patrol, fisheries protection, and naval commando training. Four ships of this class are now active with Bangladesh Coast Guard as offshore patrol vessels (OPVs).

== Ships of the class ==
Italian Navy – Minerva class
Name	Pennant number	Builder	Hull number	Laid Down	Launched	Commissioned	Decommissioned	Status
Minerva	F 551	Fincantieri; Riva Trigoso (La Spezia)	923	11 March 1985	3 April 1986	10 June 1987	14 May 2015	Sold to Bangladesh Coast Guard; Serving as CGS Syed Nazrul (PL71) since 3 August 2016
Urania	F 552	Fincantieri; Riva Trigoso (La Spezia)	924	4 April 1985	21 June 1986	1 June 1987	10 March 2016	Sold to Bangladesh Coast Guard; Serving as CGS Mansoor Ali (PL73) since June 2017
Danaide	F 553	Fincantieri; Muggiano (La Spezia)	925	26 June 1985	18 October 1986	9 September 1987	10 March 2016	Sold to Bangladesh Coast Guard; Serving as CGS Kamruzzaman (PL74) since June 2017
Sfinge	F 554	Fincantieri; Muggiano (La Spezia)	926	2 September 1986	16 May 1987	13 February 1988	29 May 2017	Scrapped 2024 Turkey
Driade	F 555	Fincantieri; Riva Trigoso (La Spezia)	5850	18 March 1988	11 March 1989	19 April 1990	25 September 2019	Scrapped 2024 Turkey
Chimera	F 556	Fincantieri; Muggiano (La Spezia)	5851	21 December 1988	7 April 1990	15 January 1991	25 September 2019	Scrapped 2024 Turkey
Fenice	F 557	Fincantieri; Muggiano (La Spezia)	5852	6 September 1988	9 September 1989	11 September 1990	29 May 2017	Scrapped 2024 Turkey
Sibilla	F 558	Fincantieri; Riva Trigoso (La Spezia)	5853	16 October 1989	15 September 1990	16 May 1991	14 May 2015	Sold to Bangladesh Coast Guard; Serving as CGS Tajuddin (PL72) since 3 August 2016

== Leader-class offshore patrol vessel ==
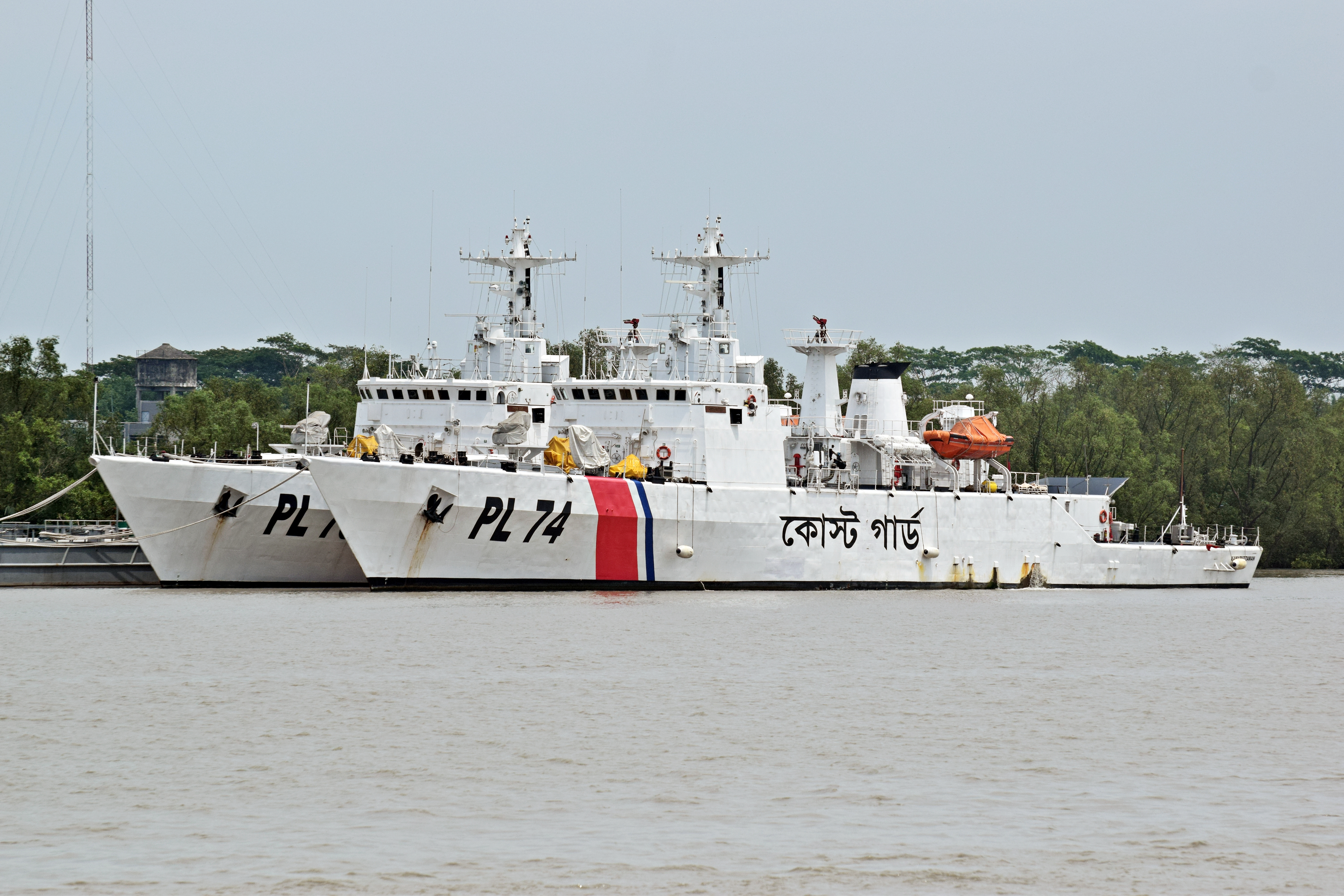
Leader-class OPV of the Bangladesh Coast Guard

Four ships of this class, namely Minerva, Urania, Danaide and Sibilla, were acquired by the Bangladesh Coast Guard. These ships were reclassified as Leader-class offshore patrol vessels. Before delivery, each ship's weapons and sensor systems were removed and replaced with one Oerlikon KBA 25 mm gun and modern sensors appropriate to coast guard roles. A helipad was added at the stern of each ship to accommodate a search and rescue helicopter.
