= Italian frigate Alpino (F 580) =

Cold war era Italian Frigate

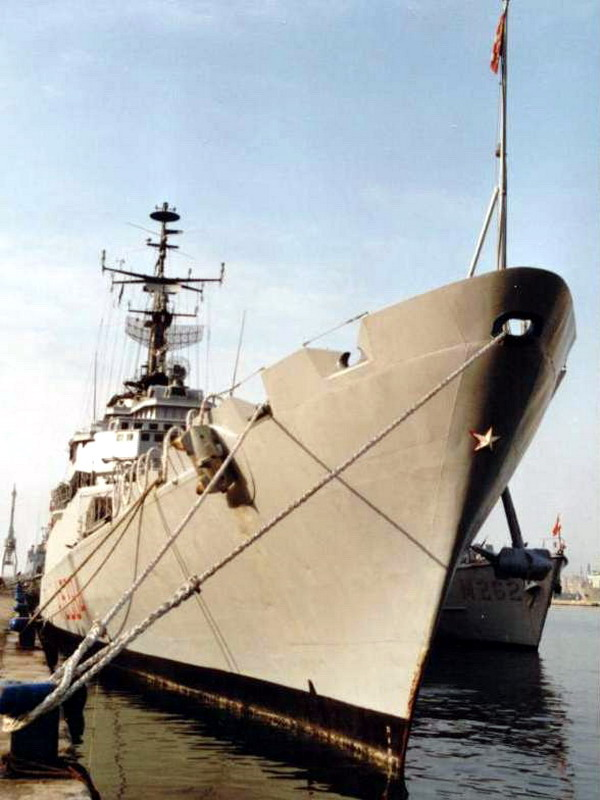
- Alpino docked in Málaga after 1996

History

Italy
- Name: Alpino
- Namesake: Alpini
- Ordered: 1959
- Builder: Cantieri Navali Riuniti (CNR), Riva Trigoso
- Laid down: 27 February 1963
- Launched: 10 June 1967
- Commissioned: 14 January 1968
- Decommissioned: 31 March 2006
- Motto: Italian: Di qui non si passa “From here you shall not pass”

General characteristics as built
- Type: Frigate
- Displacement: 2,000 long tons (2,032 t) (standard); 2,700 long tons (2,743 t) (full load)
- Length: 113.30 m (371 ft 9 in)
- Beam: 13.10 m (43 ft 0 in)
- Draught: 3.8 m (12 ft 6 in)
- Installed power: 2 gas turbines 15,000 shp (11,000 kW); 4 diesel engines 16,800 shp (12,500 kW)
- Propulsion: 2-shaft CODAG
- Speed: 28 kn (52 km/h; 32 mph) with gas turbines and diesels; 20 kn (37 km/h; 23 mph) with diesels only
- Range: 4,040 nmi (7,480 km; 4,650 mi) at 18 knots (33 km/h; 21 mph) (diesels)
- Complement: 163
- Sensors & processing systems: Radar: SPS-12 air search; SPQ-2 air/surface search/navigation; RTN-10X fire control; Sonar: SQS-43 hull-mounted; SQA-10 VDS
- Armament: 6 × 76 mm (3 in)/62 AA guns; 1 × 305 mm (12 in) Menon anti-submarine mortar; 2 × Mark 32 triple 324 mm (12.8 in) torpedo tubes
- Aircraft carried: 2 × AB-204 or AB-212ASW helicopters
- Aviation facilities: Telescopic hangar

Alpino was a Alpino-class frigate operated by the Italian Navy during the Cold War. Launched in 1967, the vessel was optimised for anti-submarine warfare based on two Agusta-Bell AB.204 helicopters protected by a telescopic hangar and a variable-depth sonar (VDS). It was also the first frigate to use gas turbines, in a combined diesel and gas (CODAG) arrangement. In 1973, the frigate undertook the longest continuous voyage of an Italian naval ship, covering over 7,000 nautical miles (13,000 kilometres; 8,100 miles), and continued to serve in the anti-submarine role until 1996, by which time the helicopters had been replaced by the more capable Agusta-Bell AB-212ASW and the VDS taken out of service. In 1997, the ship was recommissioned as a support ship for mine warfare, at the same time as the ability to operate one of the helicopters was removed. The frigate was decommissioned in 2006.

== Design and development ==
The Alpino-class frigates were created by CNR in Riva Trigoso as an improvement on the Centauro class. The design was authorised in the 1959/1960 Italian naval programme but was radically redesigned in 1962. They were the first Italian frigates with sharply raked bows, gas turbines and a variable depth sonar. Although intended as a four-ship class, only two warships were eventually built. The class was named after types of soldiers, and specifically after two World War II Soldati-class destroyers.

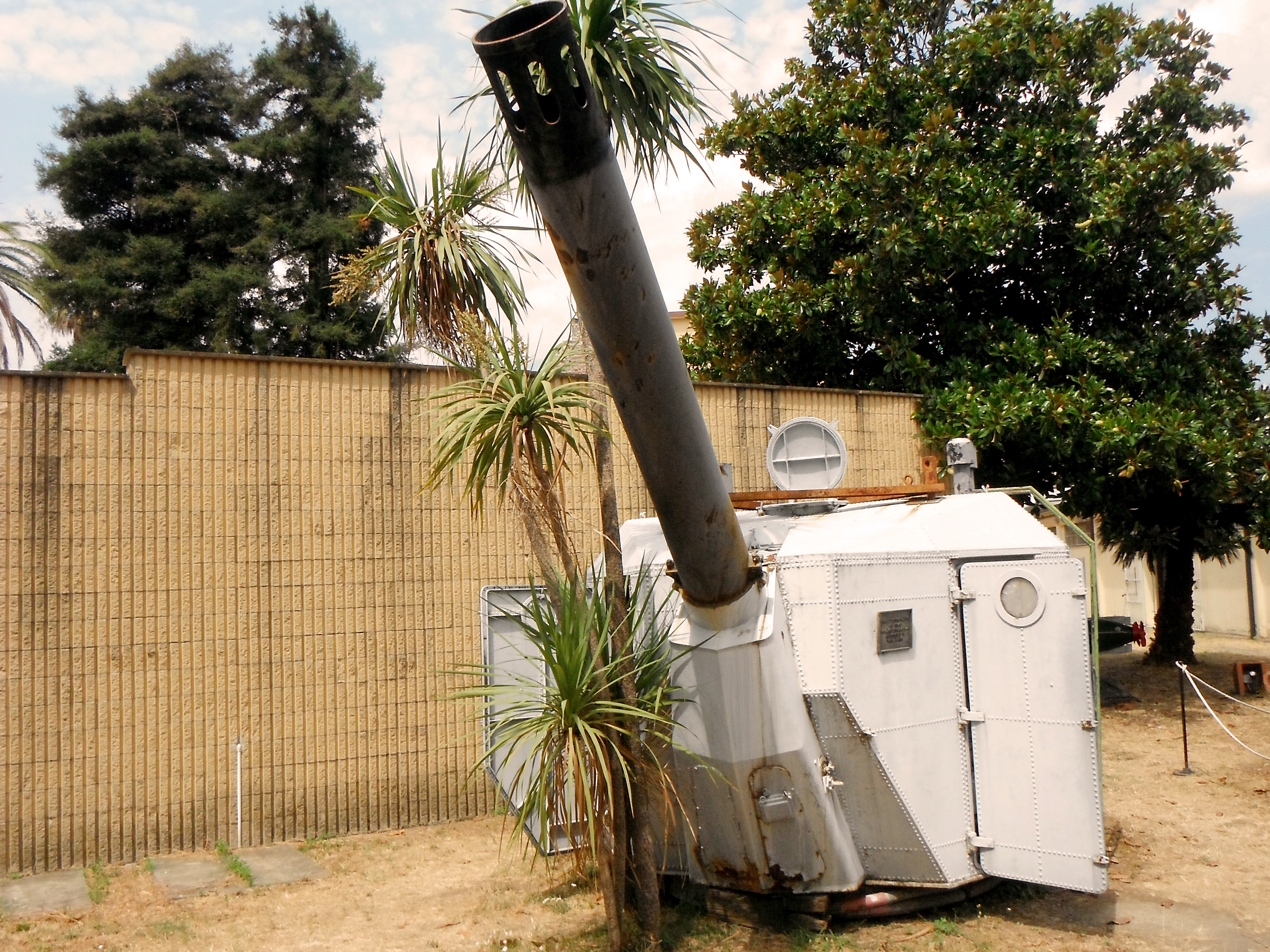
The Menon anti-submarine mortar from Alpino, now sited in La Spezia

Alpino was 113.30 m (371 ft 9 in) long overall with a beam of 13.10 m (43 ft 0 in) and a draught of 3.8 m (12 ft 6 in). Displacement was 2,000 long tons (2,032 t) standard and 2,700 long tons (2,743 t) at full load. The propulsion system used a combined diesel and gas (CODAG) system first trialled on the destroyer San Giorgio. The system allied two diesels and one gas turbine per shaft with a hydraulic coupling to enable the vessel to either run on diesel power alone, at low speed, or diesels, at high speed, and gas turbines simultaneously. Two 4,200 shp (3,100 kW) Tosi OTV-320 diesels were paired with each 7,500 shp (5,600 kW) Tosi-Metrovick G.6 gas turbine to provide a maximum speed of 20 kn (37 km/h; 23 mph) on diesels alone and 28 kn (52 km/h; 32 mph) with all engines running. Range was 4,040 nmi (7,480 km; 4,650 mi) at 18 knots (33 km/h; 21 mph) using the diesel engines. The ship's complement was 13 officers and 150 ratings.

Optimised for anti-submarine warfare, Alpino was designed around a hangar for two Agusta-Bell AB.204 helicopters, complemented by a single-barrel 305 mm (12 in) Menon mortar mounted forward and two Mark 32 triple 324 mm (12.8 in) torpedo tubes mounted midships. An early drawing shows the hangar straddled by a pair of 40 mm (1.6 in) guns with a single 76 mm (3 in) gun mounted fore and aft to provide anti-aircraft defence. By 1962, the efficacy of the 40 mm was in doubt and the design was redrawn with three 76 mm guns, but this was deemed insufficient against potential air threats. When launched, the vessel had no less than six single mounts.

Alpino was equipped with an extensive sensor suite, with a SPS-12 air search radar from RCA and a SPQ-2 navigational radar (which also combined air and surface search) from SMA. The ship was equipped with three Selenia Orion RTN-10X fire-control radars which was coordinated with an ELSAG Argo O control system. For submarine detection, a Litton SQA-10 suite was fitted, which used the same electronics to drive both a hull-mounted and a variable-depth sonar.

== Construction and career ==
=== Anti-submarine warfare frigate ===
Circe was laid down as the lead ship of the class on 27 February 1963, but was renamed Alpino in June 1965 prior to being launched on 10 June 1967. The new name recalled the Alpini. The launch took place in the presence of members of this specialist force, which also shares the ship's motto Di qui non si passa (From here, you shall not pass). Commissioned on 14 January 1968 with the pendant number F580, Alpino was employed in an escort role, although it was envisioned that this would be more escorting convoys of merchant ships rather than combat fleets in a time of conflict. The commissioning ceremony was attended by Maria Solimano, mother of Francesco Solimano, a member of the Alpini that received the Gold Medal of Military Valour for his action in Russia during the Second World War. Between 14 January and 6 June 1973, the ship undertook the longest continuous voyage in the Italian Navy, covering 7,315 nautical miles (13,547 kilometres; 8,418 miles) and travelling as far as the Labrador Sea, for which the vessel was awarded a symbolic Blue Nose.

Alpino acted as the trial ship for the experimental SPQ-5A Sarchiapone radar between 1973 and 1987. It was reportedly able to locate aircraft during their take-off from the aircraft carrier USS John F. Kennedy at a distance of 350 nautical miles (650 kilometres; 400 miles). A SLQ-A ECM system was added during the 1970s, subsequently upgraded to SLQ-D. The onboard helicopters were also replaced by the more capable Agusta-Bell AB-212ASW. Consideration was given to installing the Sea Wolf surface-to-air missile system to improve anti-aircraft capability, but this was not implemented.

The ship was upgraded during a refit that ended in June 1985. A new SQS-43 hull-mounted sonar was fitted and the variable depth sonar rendered inoperable. A SLQ-747 ECM suite was fitted, replacing the SLQ-D. The vessel was also equipped with the SCLAR decoy-dispenser system which used chaff, flares and other decoys as a form of missile defense.

=== Mine warfare flagship ===
General characteristics after 1997
- Type: Minehunter flagship
- Installed power: 4 diesel engines 16,800 shp (12,500 kW)
- Propulsion: 2 shafts
- Speed: 22 knots (41 km/h; 25 mph)
- Range: 3,500 nmi (6,500 km; 4,000 mi) at 18 knots (33 km/h; 21 mph)
- Sensors & processing systems: SPS-12 air search radar; SPS-702 air/surface search radar; SPN-748 navigation radar; RTN-10X fire control radar
- Electronic warfare & decoys: SLQ-747
- Armament: 3 × 76 mm (3 in)/62 AA guns; 2 × Oerlikon 20 mm (0.8 in)/60 AA guns
- Aircraft carried: 1 × AB-212ASW helicopter
- Aviation facilities: Telescopic hangar for 1 medium helicopter

Between 14 April 1996 and 31 January 1997, Alpino was converted into the flagship for mine warfare, as a mine countermeasures support ship, a combat diver support ship and signals intelligence ship with the new pendant number A5384. As part of this conversion, the gas turbines were removed, which reduced the design top speed to 22 knots (41 km/h; 25 mph) and range to 3,500 nmi (6,500 km; 4,000 mi) at 18 knots (33 km/h; 21 mph). Three of the 76 mm guns were removed and replaced by two Oerlikon 20 mm (0.8 in)/60 anti-aircraft guns. The electronics suite was also updated, with the SPQ-2 radar replaced by a SPS-702 air and surface search radar and a SPN-748 navigation radar. The SLQ-747 ECM suite was retained. The vessel subsequently carried one rather than two helicopters.

The vessel acted in the flagship role to the Gaeta-class minehunters Crotone and Chioggia from 18 March to 22 June 2002 during a NATO training exercise in Northern Europe. From 13 May 2004, Alpino commanded MCMFORSOUTH while on exercise in the Black Sea. Thirty-eight years after being originally commissioned, the ship was decommissioned on 31 March 2006.
