= Italian ship Castore =

Castore has been borne by at least three ships of the Italian Navy and may refer to:

- Italian minelayer Castore, a minelayer launched in 1888 and discarded in 1925.
- Italian torpedo boat Castore, a Spica-class torpedo boat launched in 1936 and sunk in 1943.
- Italian frigate Castore, a Centauro-class frigate launched in 1956 and discarded in 1983.
