= Italian frigate Canopo =

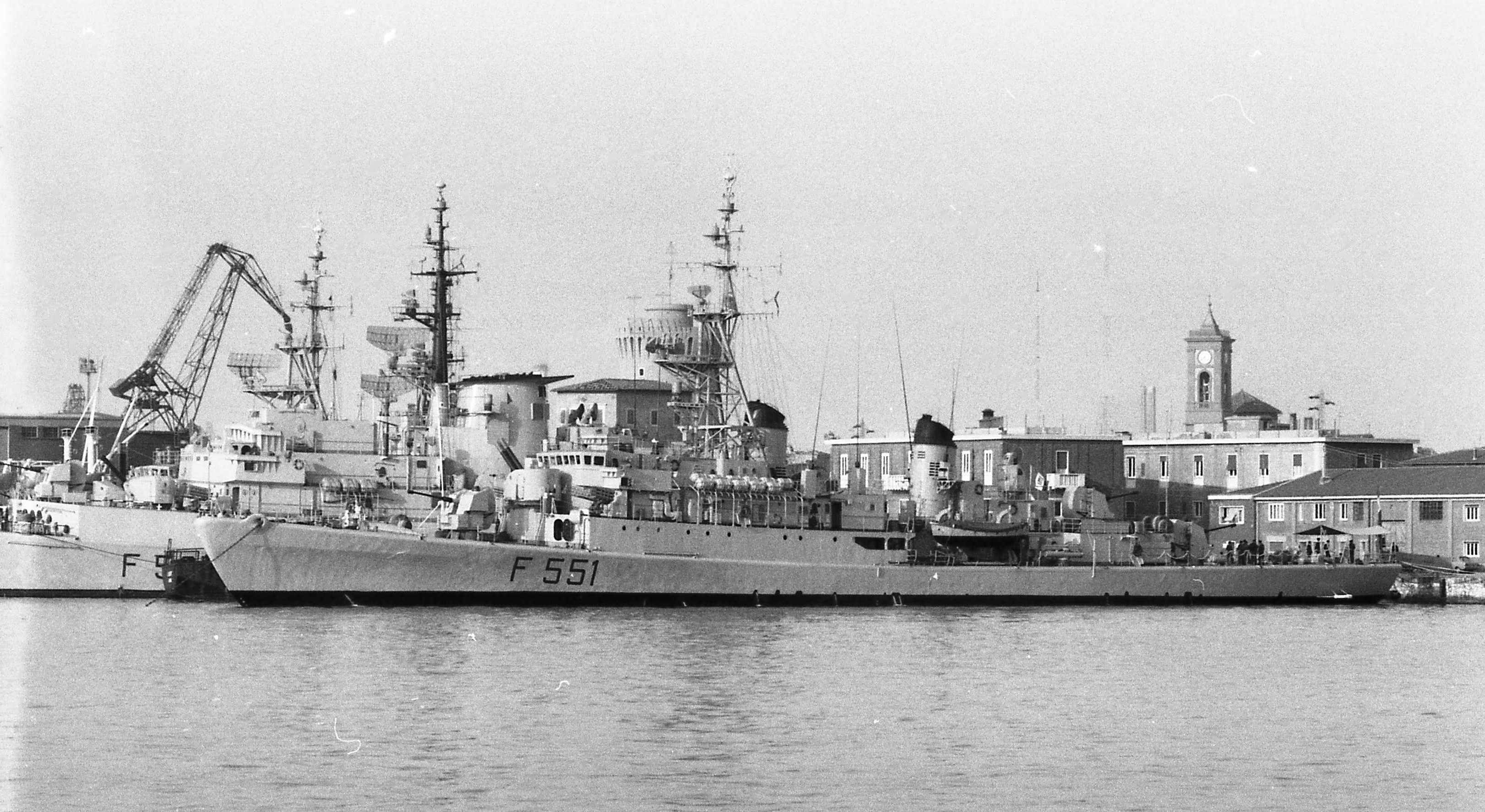
- Canopo (F 551)

History

Italy
- Name: Canopo
- Namesake: Canopus
- Builder: Cantieri navali Tosi di Taranto, Taranto
- Laid down: 15 May 1952
- Launched: 20 February 1955
- Commissioned: 1 April 1959
- Decommissioned: 30 September 1982

General characteristics (as built)
- Class & type: Centauro-class frigate
- Displacement: 2,120 t (2,090 long tons) (deep load)
- Length: 103.1 m (338 ft 3 in) (o/a)
- Beam: 12 m (39 ft 4 in)
- Draught: 3.8 m (12 ft 6 in)
- Installed power: 2 × water-tube boilers; 22,000 shp (16,000 kW)
- Propulsion: 2 shafts, 2 × geared steam turbines
- Speed: 26 knots (48 km/h; 30 mph)
- Range: 3,000 nmi (5,600 km; 3,500 mi) at 20 knots (37 km/h; 23 mph)
- Complement: 207
- Sensors & processing systems: MTLA-1 early-warning radar; MLT-4 gunnery radar; SQS-11A sonar
- Armament: 2 × twin 76 mm (3 in) DP guns; 2 × twin 40 mm (1.6 in) AA guns; 2 × single 533 mm (21 in) torpedo tubes; 1 × triple 305 mm (12 in) ASW mortar; 4 × single short-barrelled ASW mortars; 1 × single depth charge rail

Canopo was one of four Centauro-class frigates built for the Italian Navy in the 1950s.

== Design and description ==
The Centauro-class ships measured 103.1 meters (338 ft 3 in) long overall, with a beam of 12 meters (39 ft 4 in) and a draft of 3.8 meters (12 ft 6 in). Their crew numbered 207 officers and enlisted men. They displaced 1,680 metric tons (1,650 long tons) at standard load and 2,120 metric tons (2,090 long tons) at deep load. The ships had two Tosi geared steam turbines, each driving one propeller shaft using steam provided by two Foster Wheeler water-tube boilers. The turbines were rated at a total of 22,000 shaft horsepower (16,000 kW) for a speed of 26 knots (48 km/h; 30 mph). The Centauros had a range of 3,000 nautical miles (5,600 km; 3,500 mi) at 20 knots (37 km/h; 23 mph).

The main armament of the Centauro-class ships consisted of four OTO Melara 76-millimeter (3 in) Allargato dual-purpose (DP) guns in two twin-gun mounts, one each fore and aft of the superstructure. The guns were positioned over-and-under in the mount and were protected against spray by a gun shield. Four 40-millimeter (1.6 in) Bofors AA guns in twin mounts were positioned on the rear superstructure. The ships were also armed with two fixed single tubes amidships for 533-millimeter (21 in) torpedoes. A triple-barrel 305-millimeter (12 in) Menon anti-submarine (ASW) mortar mount was located in front of the superstructure, superfiring over the forward 76-millimeter gun mount. The ships were also equipped with four short-barrelled Menon ASW mortars, two on each side abreast the rear superstructure, and a depth charge rail on the stern.

The main guns were italian and the anti-air guns were american, while the sensors and fire-control systems (FCS) were Italian, although based on American equipment. The frigates were initially fitted with a Microlambda MLA-1 early-warning radar and the OTO Melara guns used a MTL-4 gunnery radar on the OG 2 director, an Italian version of the American Mark 39 radar used in the Mark 57 FCS. The MLA-1 systems were replaced by American AN/SPS-6 radars in all four ships by 1960. The Bofors guns used the OG 1 FCS, based on the Mark 51 FCS. A SQS-11A sonar provided data to the anti-submarine weapons.

Canopo was rearmed in 1968–1969 with three of the first generation of the OTO Melara 76 mm Compact DP guns in single-gun mounts to replace the unsatisfactory Allargato guns and the Bofors guns. The Allargatos were hard to load, difficult to maintain and the mount lacked a sufficient number of ready rounds. The torpedo tubes and two of the short barrel Menon mortars were removed in exchange for two rotating triple tube mounts, one on each side, for 324-millimeter (12.8 in) Mark 44 torpedoes. The sensors and fire-control suites were also upgraded, a SQS-36 sonar being added as was a MM/SPQ-2 radar. An OG 3 FCS with an Orion RTN-7X radar replaced the OG 2 director and its Mark 39 radar.

== Bibliography ==
- Blackman, Raymond V. B., ed. (1960). Jane's Fighting Ships 1960–61. London: Sampson Low, Marston & Co.
- Lyon, Hugh & Friedman, Norman (1995). "Italy". In Chumbley, Stephen (ed.). Conway's All the World's Fighting Ships 1947-1995. Annapolis, Maryland: Naval Institute Press. pp. 195–218. ISBN 1-55750-132-7.
