= Italian ship Cigno =

Cigno has been borne by at least three ships of the Italian Navy and may refer to:

- Italian torpedo boat Cigno (1906), a Pegaso-class torpedo boat launched in 1906 and discarded in 1923.
- Italian torpedo boat Cigno (1936), a Spica-class torpedo boat launched in 1936 and sunk in 1943.
- Italian frigate Cigno, a Centauro-class frigate launched in 1955 and decommissioned in 1983.
