= Italian ship Alpino =

Alpino was the name of at least four ships of the Italian Navy and may refer to:

- Italian destroyer Alpino (1909), a Soldato-class destroyer launched in 1909 and discarded in 1928.
- Italian destroyer Alpino (1938), a Soldati-class destroyer launched in 1938 and sunk in 1943.
- Italian frigate Alpino (F 580), an Alpino-class frigate launched in 1967 and decommissioned in 2006.
- Italian frigate Alpino (F 594), a Bergamini (2011)-class frigate launched in 2014.
