= Italian ship Canopo =

Canopo has been borne by at least three ships of the Italian Navy and may refer to:

- Italian torpedo boat Canopo (1907), a Pegaso-class torpedo boat launched in 1907 and discarded in 1923.
- Italian torpedo boat Canopo (1936), a Spica-class torpedo boat launched in 1936 and sunk in 1941.
- Italian frigate Canopo, a Centauro-class frigate launched in 1955 and discarded in 1982.
