= Mk44 (disambiguation) =

Mk 44 is a 30 mm chain gun manufactured by Northrop Grumman.

It may also refer to:

- Mark 44 torpedo
- The GAU-17/A minigun
