= Iroquois-class destroyer =

Class of guided missile destroyers

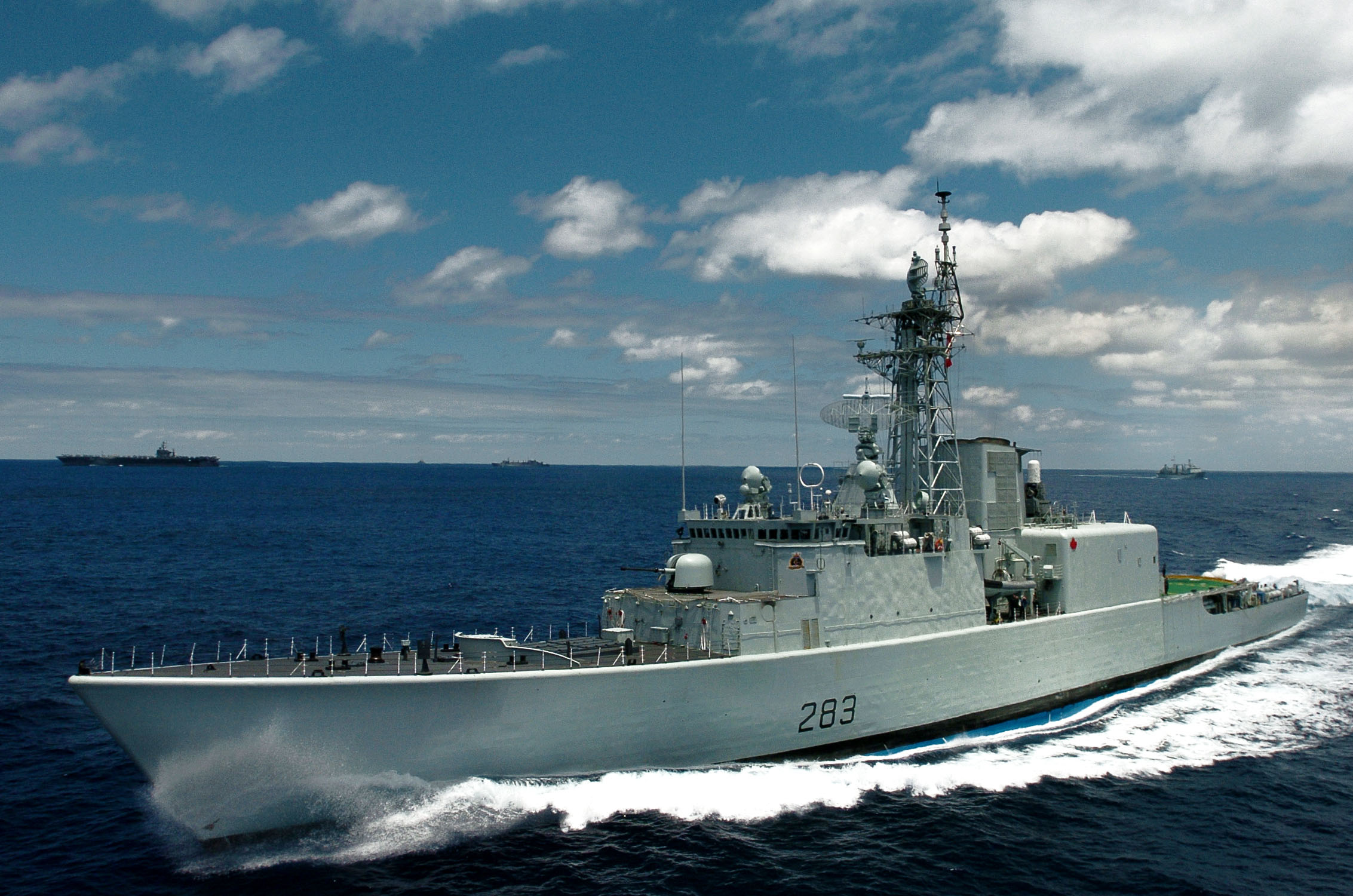
- HMCS Algonquin

Class overview
- Name: Iroquois class
- Builders: Marine Industries Ltd., Sorel; Davie Shipbuilding, Lauzon
- Operators: Canadian Maritime Forces
- Preceded by: Annapolis class
- Succeeded by: River class
- Built: 1969–1973
- In commission: 1972–2017
- Planned: 4
- Completed: 4
- Lost: 1 (sunk as target)
- Retired: 4
- Scrapped: 3

General characteristics as built
- Type: Helicopter destroyer (DDH)
- Displacement: 4,400 long tons (4,500 t) deep load
- Length: 398 ft (121 m) (wl); 426 ft (130 m) (oa)
- Beam: 50 ft (15 m)
- Draught: 14 ft (4.3 m)
- Installed power: 3 × Solar Saturn ship service gas turbine generators (750 kW ea.); 1 × Detroit Diesel generator (1000 kW)
- Propulsion: COGOG; 2 x shafts 5-bladed controllable pitch propellers; 2 × Pratt & Whitney FT12AH3 cruise gas turbines (6,400 hp; 4.8 MW); 2 × Pratt & Whitney FT4A2 boost gas turbines (50,000 hp; 37 MW)
- Speed: 29 kn (54 km/h; 33 mph)
- Range: 4,500 nmi (8,300 km; 5,200 mi)
- Complement: 280
- Sensors & processing systems: RCA & Signaal AN/SPS-501 air & surface search radar; SMA AN/SPQ-2D surface search radar; General Electric Mk. 60 Gun Fire Control System (GFCS); 2 × Signaal WM-22 STIR (Separate Target Illumination Radar); Sperry Mk. 127E navigation radar; SQS-505 hull sonar; SQS-505 VDS sonar
- Electronic warfare & decoys: AN/ULQ-6 deception transmitter; Corvus chaff launcher
- Armament: 2 × quadruple launchers for 32 Sea Sparrow SAMs; 1 × 127 mm (5 in)/54 Otobreda; 2 × Mk. 32 SVTT triple 12.75 in (324 mm) torpedo tubes firing Mark 46 Mod 1 torpedoes; 1 × Mk. NC 10 Limbo ASW mortar
- Aircraft carried: 2 × CH-124 Sea King helicopters
- Aviation facilities: Hangar and landing area with beartrap

General characteristics after TRUMP modernization, where different
- Type: Guided missile destroyer (DDG)
- Displacement: 5,100 long tons (5,200 t) deep load
- Draught: 14 ft 6 in (4.42 m)
- Propulsion: COGOG; 2 x shafts with 5-bladed controllable pitch propellers; 2 × Allison 570-KF cruise gas turbines (9.4 MW; 12,600 hp); 2 × Pratt & Whitney FT4A2 boost gas turbines (37 MW; 50,000 hp)
- Sensors & processing systems: Signaal DA-08 (AN/SPQ-501) air & surface search radar; Signaal LW-08 (AN/SPQ-502) air search radar; 2 × Signaal WM-25 (AN/SPG-501) STIR; Signaal LIROD (Lightweight Radar & Optronic Director) fire control radar; SQS-510 hull sonar; SQS-510 VDS sonar
- Electronic warfare & decoys: AN/SLQ-501 CANEWS electronic warfare suite; AN/SLQ-503 RAMSES electronic warfare suite; GEC Shield decoy launching system; Nulka decoy launching system; AN/SLQ-25 Nixie torpedo countermeasures
- Armament: 1 × Mark 41 Mod 2 VLS, 29 Standard SM-2MR Block IIIA SAMs; 1 × 76 mm (3 in)/62 OTO Melara; 2 × Mk. 32 SVTT triple 12.75 in (324 mm) torpedo tubes firing Mark 46 Mod 5 torpedoes; 1 × Phalanx CIWS (Block 1B); 6 × M2 Browning machine guns

Iroquois-class destroyers (also known as the DDH 280 class, DDG 280 class or ambiguously as the Tribal class) were a class of four helicopter-carrying, guided missile destroyers of the Royal Canadian Navy. The ships were named to honour the First Nations of Canada.

The Iroquois class are notable as the first all-gas turbine powered ships of this type in the west. Launched in the 1970s, they were originally fitted out for anti-submarine warfare, using two CH-124 Sea King helicopters and other weapons, while their Mk III RIM-7 Sea Sparrow anti-air missiles were sufficient only for point defense. A major upgrade programme in the 1990s overhauled them for area-wide anti-aircraft warfare with the installation of a vertical launch system for Standard SM-2MR Block IIIA missiles.

Due to their extended service lives, the Iroquois-class destroyers were used in a variety of operational roles. They served as flagships for NATO's maritime force, deployed as part of United Nations and NATO forces in the Adriatic, Arabian and Caribbean seas and Atlantic and Indian oceans. The destroyers also performed coastal security patrols and search and rescue missions nearer to Canada.

One was sunk in a live-fire exercise in 2007, two more were decommissioned in 2015 and the last in 2017.

== Background ==
With the disbandment of Banshee fighter aircraft squadrons and the retirement of the Second World War-vintage destroyers in the early 1960s, the Royal Canadian Navy no longer had air cover nor fire support capabilities. The Royal Canadian Navy sought to fulfill both these capabilities with the General Purpose Frigate (GPF) design. However, due to rising costs and an ambitious Defence Minister, Paul Hellyer, who had his own ideas as to where the Royal Canadian Navy should spend its money, the GPF program was cancelled on 24 October 1963.

After the cancellation of the GPF program, the Royal Canadian Navy continued to design a vessel able to fulfill the lost capabilities. Several designs were drawn up, one of which was an improved version of the GPF with a better missile system, anti-submarine warfare (ASW) rocket and large calibre gun. In September 1964, Hellyer ordered an ASW design. The Royal Canadian Navy submitted a design that matched what Hellyer required that used steam turbines instead of gas and had a planned cost of $35 million, similar to the most recent ships constructed based on the St. Laurent class.

On 22 December 1964, Hellyer announced the planned construction of four new helicopter-carrying destroyer escorts as part of a larger package of procurement for the navy. Though the Royal Canadian Navy had submitted an ASW design, it took a further four years to settle on a final one. This was due in large part to the need for the accommodation of large helicopters, variable depth sonar and the requirement to spread the industrial benefits around the country. In the end the design improved over the GPF in several ways. Instead of the twin semi-automatic 5-inch (127 mm) gun mount, the new design had a single fully automatic 5-inch gun. The GPF was intended to be armed with the RIM-24 Tartar missile system. The new design ended up with the RIM-7 Sea Sparrow missile system which was capable of taking on both missiles and aircraft. Personnel for the new class were to come from the discarded aircraft carrier Bonaventure which had been taken out of service after the government reduced force levels. In December 1967, four new helicopter-carrying destroyers were announced as part of the five-year equipment program.

In 1968, contracts were awarded to Davie Shipbuilding at Lauzon, Quebec and Marine Industries at Sorel, Quebec. However, the final drawings were not finished when all four ships were laid down in 1969. The entire program ended up costing $252 million. In 1970, the program was almost cancelled despite the fact that the ships were in production. This was due to the poor management of the program costs by the departments that governed the project. This eventually led to a significant reshuffling of senior positions at National Defence Headquarters. Commissioned in 1972–73, the ships perpetuated the names of Second World War-era Tribal-class destroyers, which led to the new class being referred to as the Tribal class.

With the arrival of the Iroquois-class destroyers, a special service centre was created ashore with the same computer system, which was far more advanced at the time compared to anything else in the navy.

== Description ==
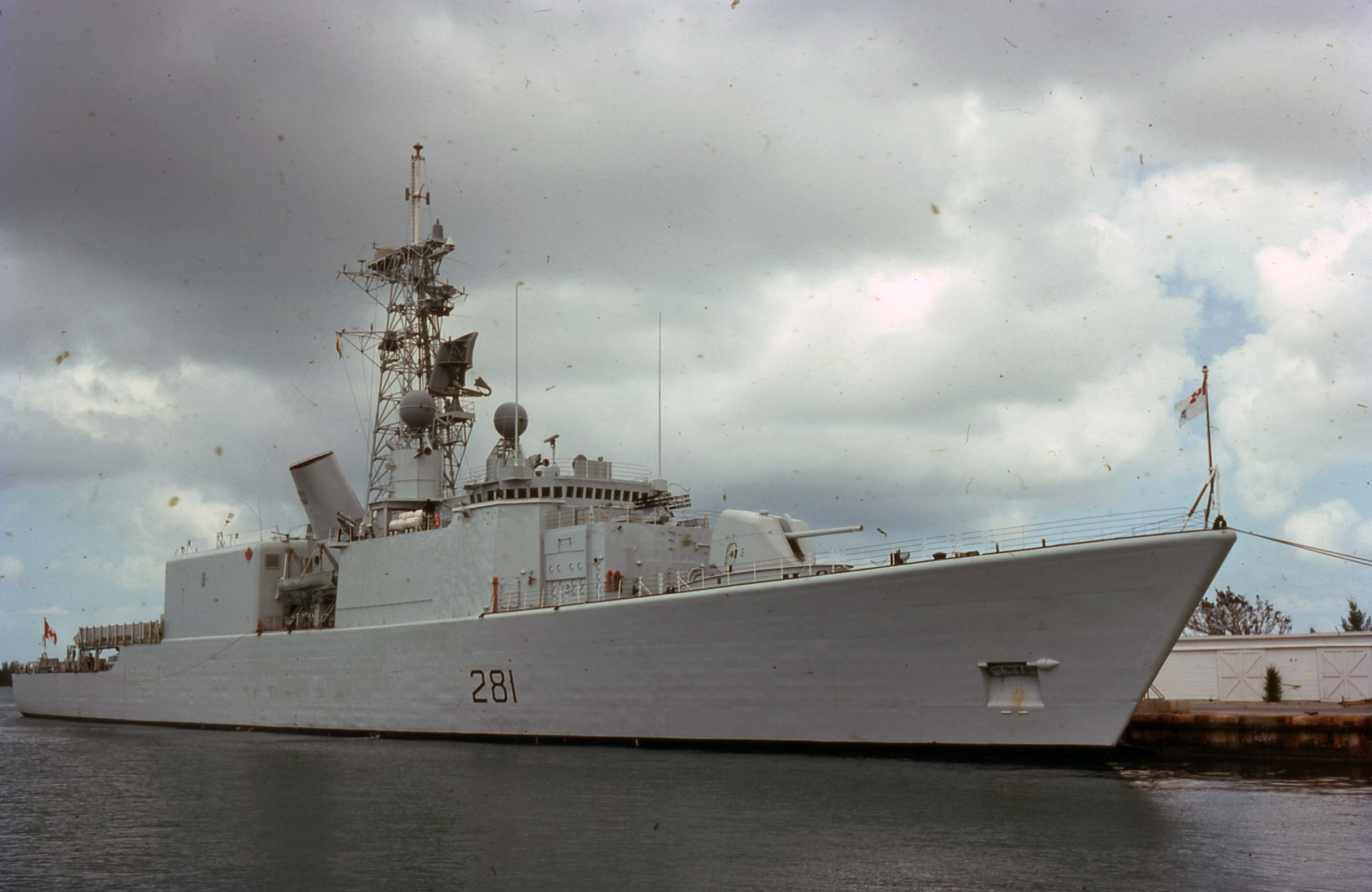
Huron in 1976 with split exhaust funnel, Sea Sparrow launcher on forward superstructure, and 5-inch (127 mm)/54-calibre gun on forecastle.

The Iroquois class were ordered in 1968 as a revised design of the GPF. Designed with enclosed citadel, bridge and machinery spaces, the sources disagree about the general description of the Iroquois class. Gardiner and Chumbley state that as designed the ships had a displacement of 3,551 and 4,700 long tons (3,608 and 4,775 t) fully loaded. The destroyers were 423 feet (129 m) long overall and 398 feet (121 m) long at the waterline with a beam of 50 feet (15 m) and a draught of 14 feet 6 inches (4.42 m). They had a complement of 258 and 30 aircrew attached to the ship's company.

Macpherson and Barrie claim that the class displaced 4,500 long tons (4,600 t), was 426 feet (130 m) long overall with a beam of 50 feet (15 m) and a draught of 15 feet (4.6 m). They state the vessels had a maximum speed of 30 knots (56 km/h; 35 mph) and had a complement of 244.

The Iroquois class used a COGOG system that was powered by two Pratt & Whitney FT4A2 gas turbines creating 50,000 shaft horsepower (37,000 kW), and for cruising, two Pratt & Whitney FT12AH3 gas turbines creating 7,400 shp (5,500 kW) which drove two five-bladed controllable pitch propellers through reduction gearing. This gave the destroyers a maximum speed of 29 knots (54 km/h; 33 mph) and a range of 4,500 nautical miles (8,300 km; 5,200 mi) at 20 knots (37 km/h; 23 mph).

The Iroquois class was also designed with the ability to carry two Sikorsky CH-124 Sea King helicopters to be used primarily for ASW. These two helicopters enhanced their ASW capability and the Iroquois class were considered excellent ASW ships due to it. The Iroquois class had a landing platform with a double hauldown and Beartrap hauldown device. The platform was large enough for a Mil Mi-14 helicopter, as it was proved during exercises in 1999 in the Baltic Sea. American and British destroyers and frigates at the time each carried a single small helicopter which was incapable of operating independently of the ship's sensors, and were effectively a system for extending the range of the weapons by carrying them away from the ship before launch. In contrast, the Iroquois-class destroyers' much larger Sea Kings were able to carry a complete sensor suite and operate at much longer ranges independently of the launch ship. This allowed a single Iroquois to control a much larger area of the ocean, using both its own sensors and those of its helicopters, combining to scan larger areas.

=== Armament ===
The Iroquois class was originally equipped with one OTO Melara 5-inch (127 mm)/54 calibre gun that was capable of firing 40 rounds per minute. (Note: The 54 calibre denotes the length of the gun. This means that the length of the gun barrel is 54 times the bore diameter.)

For anti-air defense the ship was originally armed with one Mk III RIM-7 Sea Sparrow missile system. The Iroquois class had two Sea Sparrow launchers installed, each with four missiles which allowed the ship to launch eight missiles at a time for point defense. The ships carried a total of 32 missiles. The launchers were located at the forward end of the superstructure and retracted into the deckhouse. The missile system was guided by the Hollandse Signaal Mk 22 Weapon Control System. The system was criticised for the time it took to deploy from the housing, which took several minutes in order to warm-up the guidance system, as well as the reload time, which could be up to almost ten minutes. Another reason for criticism was that the fire control system was Dutch, and the mix of the Dutch fire control and the US missile system rarely worked as intended. The missiles were also ineffective against sea-skimming anti-ship missiles, such as the Exocet.

The Iroquois class was also equipped with one Mk 10 Limbo anti-submarine mortar for ASW purposes along with two triple Mk 32 torpedo tubes in trainable mounts. The Mk 32 tubes were used to fire Mark 46 torpedoes.

=== Systems and sensors ===
The class was equipped with the Hollandse Signaal Mk 22 Weapon Control System for its missiles, and a tactical air navigation system (TACAN). The CCS 280 by Litton, which was a compressed version of the Automatic Data Link Plotting System (ADLIPS) electronic tactical system, was also installed aboard the class. Iroquois-class destroyers were equipped with an LW-03 long range warning radar antenna and SPS-501 long range warning radar. They were also equipped with SPQ-2D low level air search, surface search and navigation and M22 fire control radars. The destroyers had SQS-501 bottom target classification sonar and a hull-mounted SQS-505 sonar inside a 14-foot (4.3 m) dome. They also had the 18-foot (5.5 m) SQS-505 towed variable depth sonar.

== TRUMP refit ==
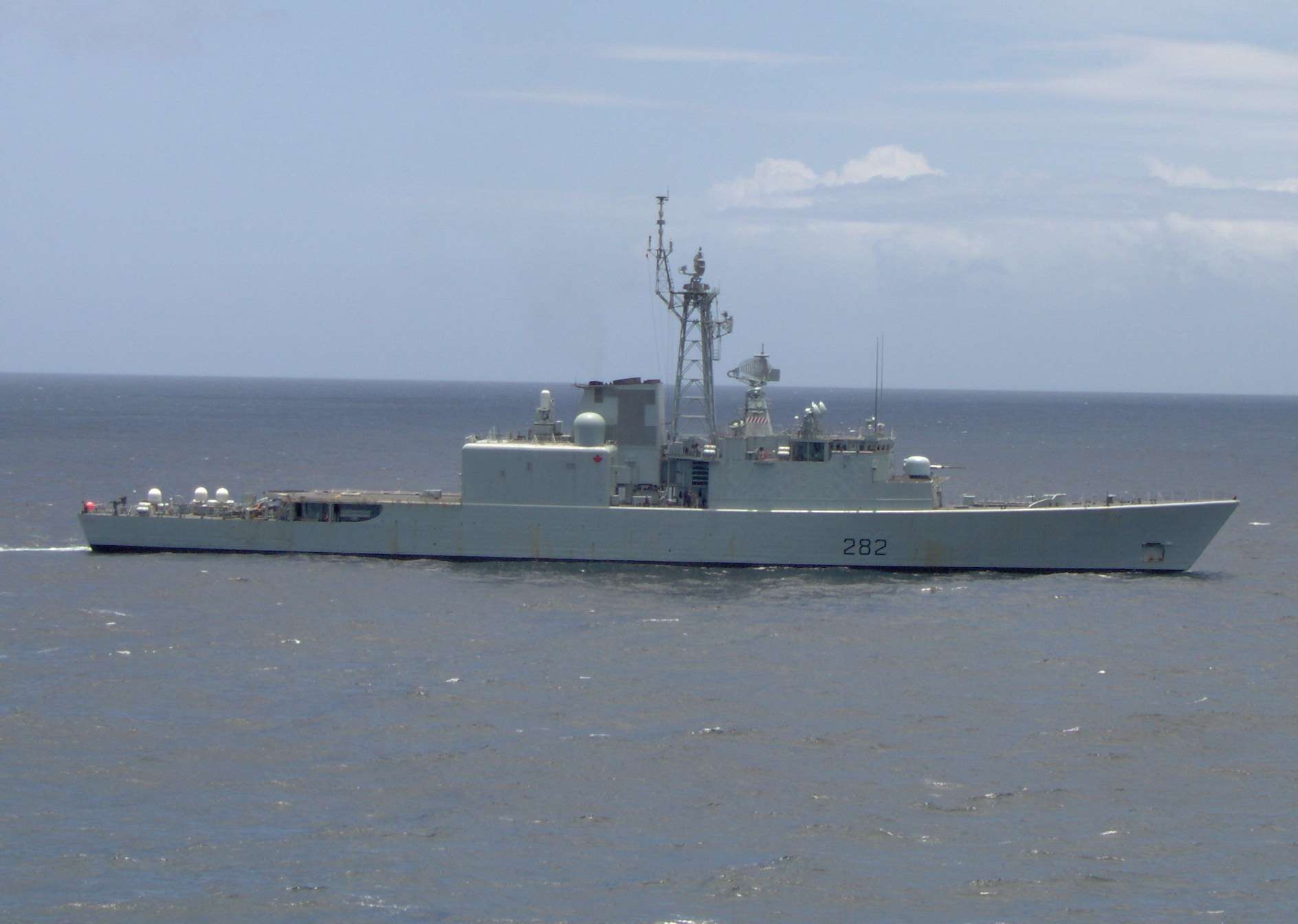
Athabaskan in 2009 – note one funnel and position of gun

In the 1980s, with the planned arrival of the Canadian Patrol Frigate Project, the Canadian Forces intended to convert the Iroquois class from primarily ASW ships to anti-air warfare (AAW) vessels as a core element of the modernization of the fleet. Named the Tribal Refit and Update Modernization Program (TRUMP), the design contract was awarded to Litton Systems Canada Ltd. and required a total reconstruction of the superstructure, new gas turbines, weaponry and electronics. In addition to their conversion to AAW vessels, the Canadian Forces sought to improve their command, control and communications capabilities in order to make them task group leaders. With this refit, the ships were also reclassified from helicopter destroyers (DDH) to guided-missile destroyers (DDG).

The shipyard contracts were handed out to Quebec shipyards by the Cabinet as a way to placate the Quebec caucus following the decision to award the Canadian Patrol Frigate Project to a New Brunswick shipyard. The total cost of the program was $1.5 billion.

During the Gulf War, before Athabaskan had been able to undergo her TRUMP refit, she was given a Mk 15 Phalanx close-in weapons system (CIWS) on her quarterdeck as part of the upgrades given to ships deploying to the Persian Gulf.

=== Alterations to initial design ===
The displacement of the ships increased to 5,100 long tons (5,200 t) at deep load after all the changes. The propulsion was overhauled also, with two GM Allison 570-KF cruising turbines being installed in place of the Pratt & Whitney FT12AH3 models which created 12,800 shaft horsepower (9,500 kW). Replacing the main FT4A-2 gas turbines with a pair of LM2500-30 was called for, but not done due to cost. The ship's funnels were also reconstructed to reduce their infrared signature, the original uptakes and outboard angled funnels being replaced with singular square model encased in a forced-air cooling system.

As part of the TRUMP refit, the entire armament was overhauled. The OTO Melara 5-inch gun was removed and replaced by a 29-cell Mk 41 vertical launch system (VLS) for the SM-2 Block 2 surface-to-air missile. The Mk 41 VLS system was placed in the reconstructed forecastle deck. In 'B' position an OTO Melara 76 mm (3 in) Super Rapid gun was installed in the space vacated by the removal of the Sea Sparrow launchers. A Mk 15 Phalanx CIWS was placed abaft the remodeled funnel. The ships also received new sensors, seeing their radar, sonar, and electronic warfare suites wholly replaced.

== Ships in class ==
Ships in class
Name	Hull number	Builder	Laid down	Launched	Commissioned	TRUMP refit	Decommissioned	Fate
Iroquois	DDG 280	Marine Industries, Sorel, Quebec	15 January 1969	28 November 1970	29 July 1972	1 November 1989 to 3 July 1992	1 May 2015	Sold for scrap, left Halifax on 24 November 2016 for Liverpool, Nova Scotia
Huron	DDG 281	Marine Industries, Sorel, Quebec	1 June 1969	9 April 1971	16 December 1972	July 1993 to 25 November 1994	31 March 2005	Sunk in live fire exercise off Vancouver Island, 14 May 2007
Athabaskan	DDG 282	Davie Shipbuilding, Lauzon, Quebec	1 June 1969	27 November 1970	30 September 1972	October 1991 to 3 August 1994	10 March 2017	Sold for scrap, left Halifax on 29 March 2018 for Sydney, Nova Scotia
Algonquin	DDG 283	Davie Shipbuilding, Lauzon, Quebec	1 September 1969	23 April 1971	3 November 1973	26 October 1987 to 11 October 1991	11 June 2015	Sold for scrap 27 November 2015; scrapped at Liverpool, Nova Scotia in 2016

== Service history ==
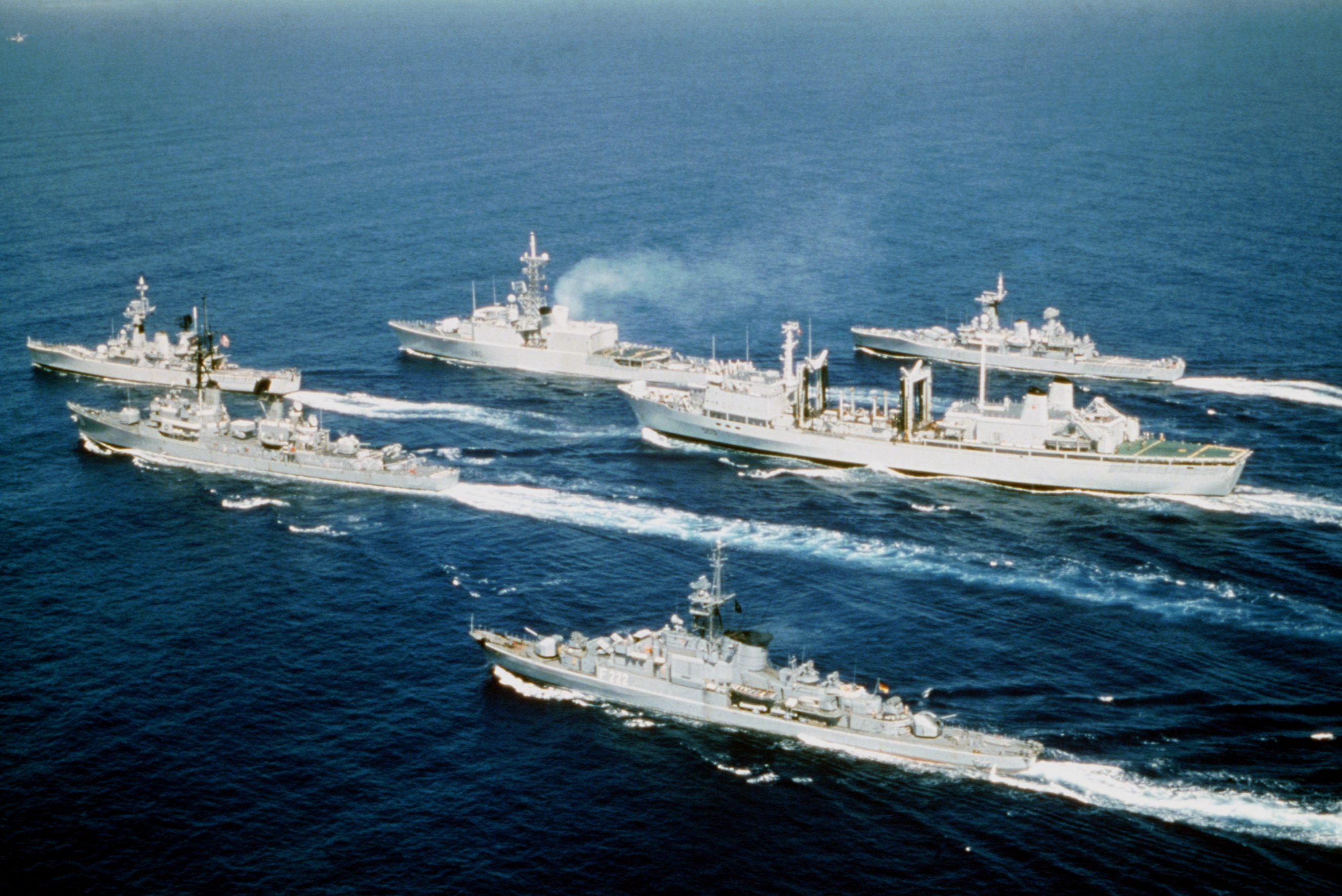
STANAVFORLANT underway in 1982. Iroquois is centre top left.

All of the Iroquois class was laid down in 1969, Iroquois on 15 January, Huron and Athabaskan on 1 June and Algonquin on 1 September. Their names were chosen both to honour the First Nations of Canada, but also to perpetuate the names of destroyers that served during the Second World War. Iroquois was the first to commission, on 29 July 1972, followed by Athabaskan on 30 September, Huron on 16 December and Algonquin on 3 November 1973.

By the early 1980s, the Iroquois-class were the only surface vessels in the Canadian navy that were capable of fighting a modern war. The destroyers underwent the TRUMP modifications beginning in 1987, with Algonquin being taken in hand on 26 October to 11 October 1991; Iroquois, 1 November 1989 to 3 July 1992; Athabaskan, from October 1991 to 3 August 1994; and Huron, from July 1993 and 25 November 1994.

From the onset of their careers, the Iroquois-class ships were deployed to NATO naval missions such as STANAVFORLANT, performing search and rescue missions, such as Algonquin rescuing the crew from the fishing vessel Paul & Maria in 1974 or Athabaskan in 1981 when she sailed to rescue the crew of MV Euro Princess. They also participated in many major naval exercises.

Iroquois, Huron and Algonquin were all flagships of STANAVFORLANT in 1978–79. In 1986, Algonquin captured the renegade fishing vessel Peonia 7 which had made off with personnel from the Department of Fisheries and Oceans. Peonia 7 had been caught illegally fishing in Canada's exclusive economic zone and had been boarded by Fisheries personnel for inspection. In 1987, Huron became the first member of the class to transfer to the west coast of Canada. In 1988, while attempting to assist the Belgian frigate Westhinder which had already grounded, Athabaskan herself went aground in Vestfjord, Norway.

On 24 August 1990, Athabaskan, after a refit to add several advanced weapons including a close-in weapon system (CIWS), sailed to the Arabian Sea as flagship of the naval component of Operation Friction, the Canadian contribution to the Gulf War. The task group served in the central Persian Gulf, with other coalition naval forces, through the fall of 1990. After Operation Desert Storm began in January 1991, the task group undertook escort duties for hospital ships and other vulnerable naval vessels of the coalition. When the Ticonderoga-class cruiser USS Princeton detonated two Iraqi bottom-moored influence mines (MANTAs) at the north end of the Persian Gulf and was seriously damaged, her commanding officer specifically requested the assistance of Athabaskan. Athabaskan could simultaneously operate two CH-124 Sea King helicopters, originally for anti-submarine warfare, which proved useful in searching out mines for long periods until a U.S. Navy minesweeper arrived. Athabaskan returned to her task group and remained on station in the Persian Gulf until after the war ended. After the hostilities were complete she was relieved by her sister ship Huron.

In 1993 Algonquin was flagship of the force sent to the Adriatic Sea to enforce the blockade on Yugoslavia. Iroquois deployed in September 1993 to the Adriatic to take part in the blockade, returning in April 1994. In August 1994, Algonquin transferred to the west coast.

In September 1999, Huron, carrying Canadian immigration officials, intercepted a ship trafficking 146 Chinese migrants. Royal Canadian Mounted Police boarded the vessel from Huron while the destroyer escorting the vessel into Nootka Sound. On 3 August 2000, Athabaskan sent her helicopter to board GTS Katie, a cargo vessel carrying Canadian military equipment whose charterer refused to deliver them.

On 17 October 2001, as part of Operation Apollo, Iroquois led the Canadian Task Group to the Arabian Sea. Eventually, Algonquin and Athabaskan also took part in the War in Afghanistan. In 2003, while readying for deployment to Operation Apollo, Iroquois's Sea King crashed on deck and the ship was forced to return to Halifax.

In September 2005, Athabaskan was among the Canadian ships sent to Louisiana to aid in the recovery efforts following the devastation of New Orleans by Hurricane Katrina. In 2008 Iroquois was among the Canadian warships deployed to the waters off Somalia as part of CTF 150, the multi-national task force that concerned itself with drug and people smuggling and piracy in the region.

In 2010, after Haiti was hit by a major earthquake followed by at least twelve significant aftershocks, Canada sent Athabaskan and the frigate Halifax to Haiti as part of Operation Hestia. Athabaskan was sent to Leogane. In 2011, Athabaskan and Algonquin deployed to the Caribbean Sea as part of Operation Caribbe, a counter-narcotics smuggling operation. Iroquois deployed in 2012, with Athabaskan returning in 2014 and 2015. HMCS Algonquin was also deployed during the 2010 Winter Olympics as part of Operation Podium.

=== Retirement ===
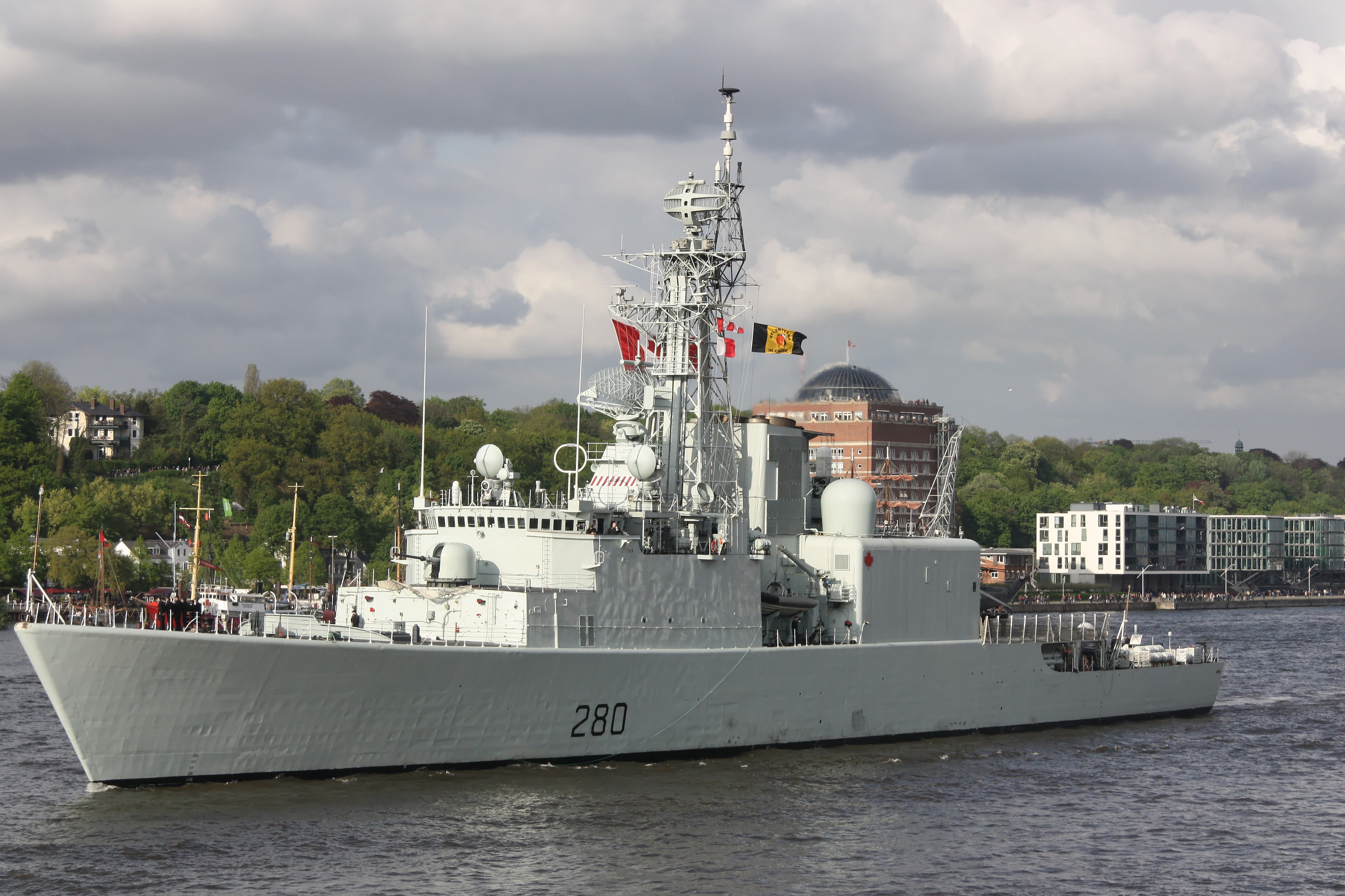
Iroquois underway in 2013

Despite Huron being the most recently refitted Iroquois-class destroyer, she was placed in mothballed status in 2000, due to a personnel shortage following defence cutbacks during the late 1990s. Huron was paid off in 2005, and sunk in a live-fire exercise in 2007 by her sister ship Algonquin.

In August 2013, Algonquin was involved in a collision with the auxiliary vessel HMCS Protecteur during a naval exercise. Algonquin suffered significant damage along her port side hangar. The vessel was laid up following the collision. In May 2014, while visiting Boston, Massachusetts, severe cracks were discovered in the hull of Iroquois requiring her immediate return to Canada and lay up for inspection. The inspection determined the hull was compromised and would require the ship to be laid up indefinitely. On 19 September 2014, the Royal Canadian Navy announced that these two ships were to be paid off along with the Protecteur class, leaving only Athabaskan active.

On 27 November 2015, Algonquin, along with Protecteur, was sold to be broken up for scrap to R.J. MacIsaac Ltd. of Antigonish, Nova Scotia. They were towed to Liverpool, Nova Scotia where the work was done. On 10 March 2017 Athabaskan, the last active ship in the class, was decommissioned.

== Replacement ==
In 2008 the Single Class Surface Combatant Project which was included in the National Shipbuilding Procurement Strategy was announced as the replacement for the Iroquois class. The new vessels will eventually replace the Halifax class, as well as the capabilities previously provided by the Iroquois class, beginning in about the mid-2020s. In October 2018, a group led by BAE Systems along with its partners Lockheed Martin Canada, CAE Inc., L3 Technologies, MacDonald, Dettwiler and Associates and Ultra Electronics, were selected as the preferred design. On 8 February 2019, Canada signed an agreement with Lockheed Martin Canada, BAE Systems, Inc. and Irving Shipbuilding to design and construct the $60 billion Canadian Surface Combatant project.

== See also ==
- List of destroyer classes
- St. Laurent-class destroyer
- Mackenzie-class destroyer
- Annapolis-class destroyer
- Restigouche-class destroyer

Equivalent destroyers of the same era

- Tachikaze class
- Audace class
- Type 42
- Spruance class
- Sovremenny class
- Gangwon class
- Type 051
