= General Purpose Frigate (Canada) =

Procurement project for Canadian Navy

Class overview
- Name: General Purpose Frigate
- Operators: Royal Canadian Navy
- Preceded by: Prestonian class
- Succeeded by: Iroquois-class destroyer
- Planned: 8
- Canceled: 8

General characteristics
- Type: Frigate
- Displacement: 3,551 t (3,495 long tons) normal; 4,700 t (4,600 long tons) deep load
- Length: ~423 ft (128.9 m) oa
- Beam: ~50 ft (15.2 m)
- Draught: ~14 ft 6 in (4.4 m)
- Propulsion: 2 shaft geared steam turbines, 36,000 shp (27,000 kW)
- Speed: 30 knots (56 km/h; 35 mph)
- Armament: 1 × twin 5 in (127 mm)/54 calibre Mk 42 gun; 1 × RIM-24 Tartar surface-to-air missile system; ASW torpedo tubes

The General Purpose Frigate, or GPF, was a procurement project for the Royal Canadian Navy during the Cold War. The class was also known as the Tribal-class frigate. Intended as a replacement for the Second World War-era destroyers in service at the time, the frigate design was developed for the Progressive Conservative Diefenbaker government in the late 1950s as part of the general fleet renewal program. The GPF program was cancelled under the Liberal Pearson government as part of their plan to reshape the Canadian Armed Forces. Following the cancellation, a modified version of the design was used for the Iroquois-class destroyers.

== Background ==
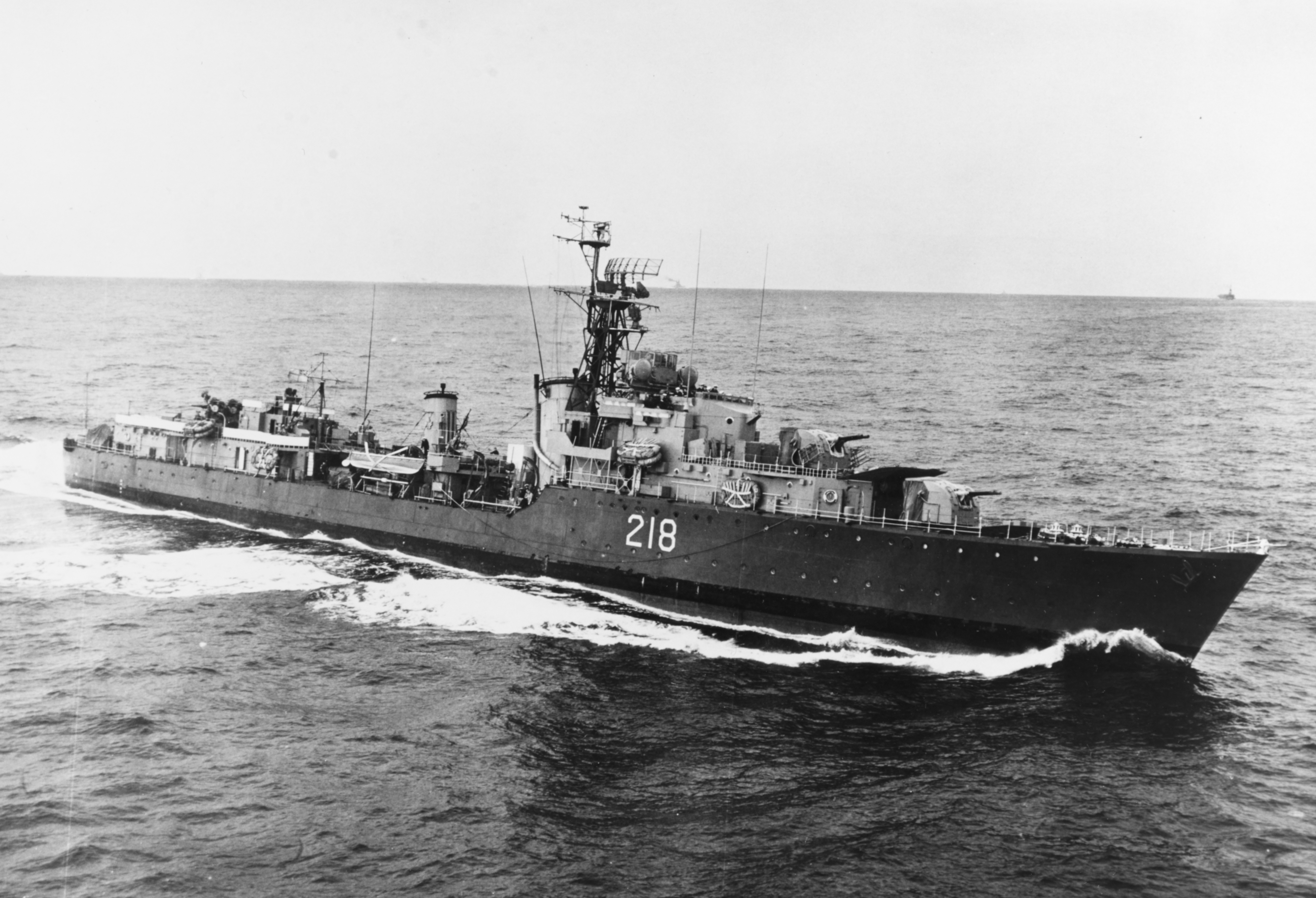
One of the Tribal-class destroyers intended to be replaced by the GPF (HMCS Cayuga pictured)

The Brock Report was released in 1961 and identified the need for a ship capable of replacing the Tribal-class destroyers for the Royal Canadian Navy, especially their ability to provide naval gunfire support, along with being capable of carrying a helicopter. The need for further dedicated anti-submarine warfare (ASW) surface platforms was questioned due to the planned addition of submarines. A new design was needed to maintain Canada's surface capability. However, the ships would retain some ASW capability.

At the same time NATO had developed a new defence plan, implemented in 1954, that called on Canada to have a force capable of fielding 43 ships. Among the plan's suggestions was the need for Canadian ships to be forward deployed, capable of operating in regions under the threat of Soviet air attack. In response, Canadian naval planners sought to aim for a balanced fleet. This would require an air-defence element, one that was being lost with the jettisoning of the F2H Banshee aircraft.

The argument supporting the need for the GPFs were based on Canadian foreign policy at the time. Canada's destroyers had been the first Canadian military units deployed to the Korean War in 1950 and the Royal Canadian Navy had carried a Canadian battalion to Egypt following the Suez Crisis. It was argued that a GPF should then be capable of being deployed on United Nations missions. The Conservative government also sought to support the Canadian shipbuilding industry, with a plan to build the eight planned frigates in several yards with subcontracting to Canadian businesses. This was done partially for political expediency and because by 1961, the Canadian shipbuilding industry was in need of work following the collapse of the Canadian merchant shipping fleet in the 1950s.

=== Development ===
The GPFs were included as part of the 1961 building program of the Royal Canadian Navy after being presented to the Chiefs of Staff in May. The costing for the program was included in the annual estimates. The building program recommended the construction of eight GPFs which was agreed to by the Cabinet of Canada on 19 March 1962.

On 11 April 1962, the program was announced in the House of Commons by the Defence Minister and indicated that construction would start by the end of 1963. The original cost per ship was estimated at C$31 million, however, the design was not finished and by June 1962, the cost had risen to $46 million per ship. By December 1962 the keel laying had been postponed.

== Design ==
The design called for a versatile platform, capable of fulfilling several capabilities, such as naval gunfire support, troop lift, and guided missiles. The vessels would also be able to carry a helicopter and have the speed to catch nuclear-powered submarines. The dimensions of the design resembled the later Iroquois-class destroyer, as the destroyers were based on the General Purpose Frigate design. Gardiner, Chumbley and Budzbon claim that the GPFs would have had the same displacement and dimensions as the Iroquois class, displacing 3,551 tonnes (3,495 long tons) normal and 4,700 tonnes (4,626 long tons) at deep load. They would have been approximately 423 feet (128.9 m) long overall with a 50-foot (15.2 m) beam and a 14-foot-6-inch (4.4 m) draught. However, Milner states that the Iroquois class's beam were wider after a design change.

The class was to be powered by two shaft geared steam turbines creating 36,000 shaft horsepower (26,845 kW). This would give the frigates a designed speed of 30 knots (56 km/h; 35 mph). They were intended to be armed with one twin semi-automatic 5-inch (127 mm)/54 calibre Mk 42 gun and one RIM-24 Tartar surface-to-air missile system and the anti-air MIM-46 Mauler missile system. (Note: The 54 calibre denotes the length of the gun. This means that the length of the gun barrel is 54 times the bore diameter.) They were also to be equipped with ASW torpedo tubes.

== Cancellation and fate ==
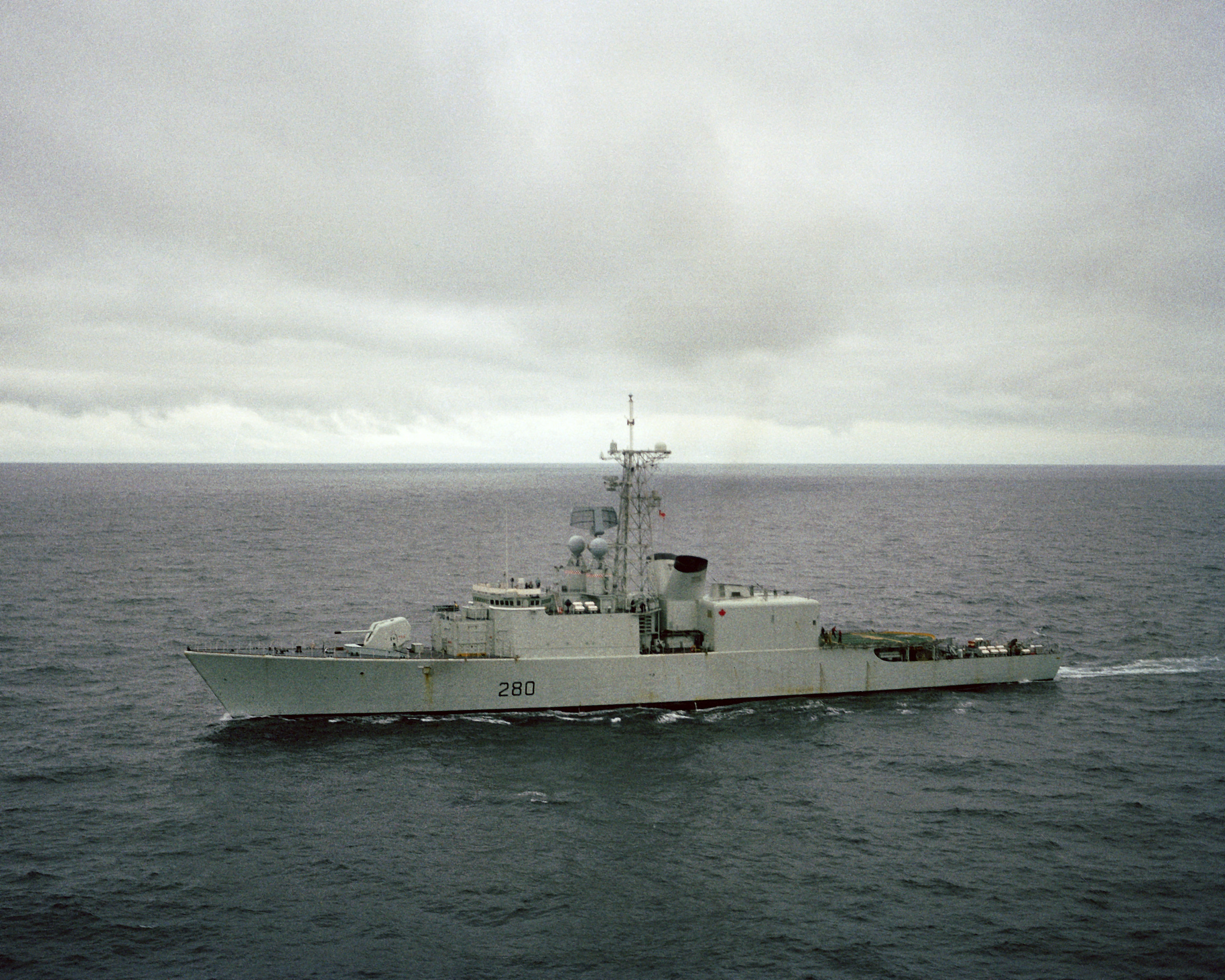
The Iroquois-class destroyer HMCS Iroquois under way in the North Atlantic in 1982

Issues arose around the project, including a lack of ministerial oversight on program costs, a lack of qualified engineers and draftsmen to finish the design and design changes by the Naval Board. The Treasury Board sought projected costs for the program, which were estimated at C$150–200 million.

To keep the project on schedule, the Royal Canadian Navy chose supplies even though the design was not complete. As design changes delayed the project, estimated costs climbed to roughly C$428 million in 1963. In May 1963, Canada was informed by the United States that delays in the Tartar missile project would require C$250 million more in funding to solve the problems with that program.

The Conservative government had been defeated in the 1963 federal election, with an incoming Liberal government. In May 1963, the new Minister of National Defence, Paul Hellyer, ordered the program reviewed and in June, all government capital programs were suspended.

On 10 October 1963 the program was cancelled by Cabinet as a result of the internal debate about the future of the Royal Canadian Navy. The debate centered on the direction of the future fleet, the focus being on anti-submarine warfare or a more balanced fleet. This took place publicly both in a Maclean's magazine article in September 1963 and before a Special Committee on Defence where the author of the article, Commodore James Plomer and Vice Admiral Herbert Rayner presented their views. However, Hellyer had already decided the fate of the program and the cancellation was announced in the House of Commons on 24 October.

After the cancellation of the GPF project there was still a need for new ships to replace those to be retired and the Royal Canadian Navy came up with several versions of improved GPFs. Paul Hellyer insisted on an ASW platform. The Navy came back with a design similar to that of the GPF and could carry two helicopters. However, in order to do so, they hid some of the details of the project from the minister in order to get approval. This design would become known as the Iroquois-class destroyer.

== See also ==
- Canada-class submarine, another failed Canadian procurement project
- Australian light destroyer project, a cancelled destroyer class of similar armament and size
