= Alpino-class frigate =

1967 class of Italian frigates

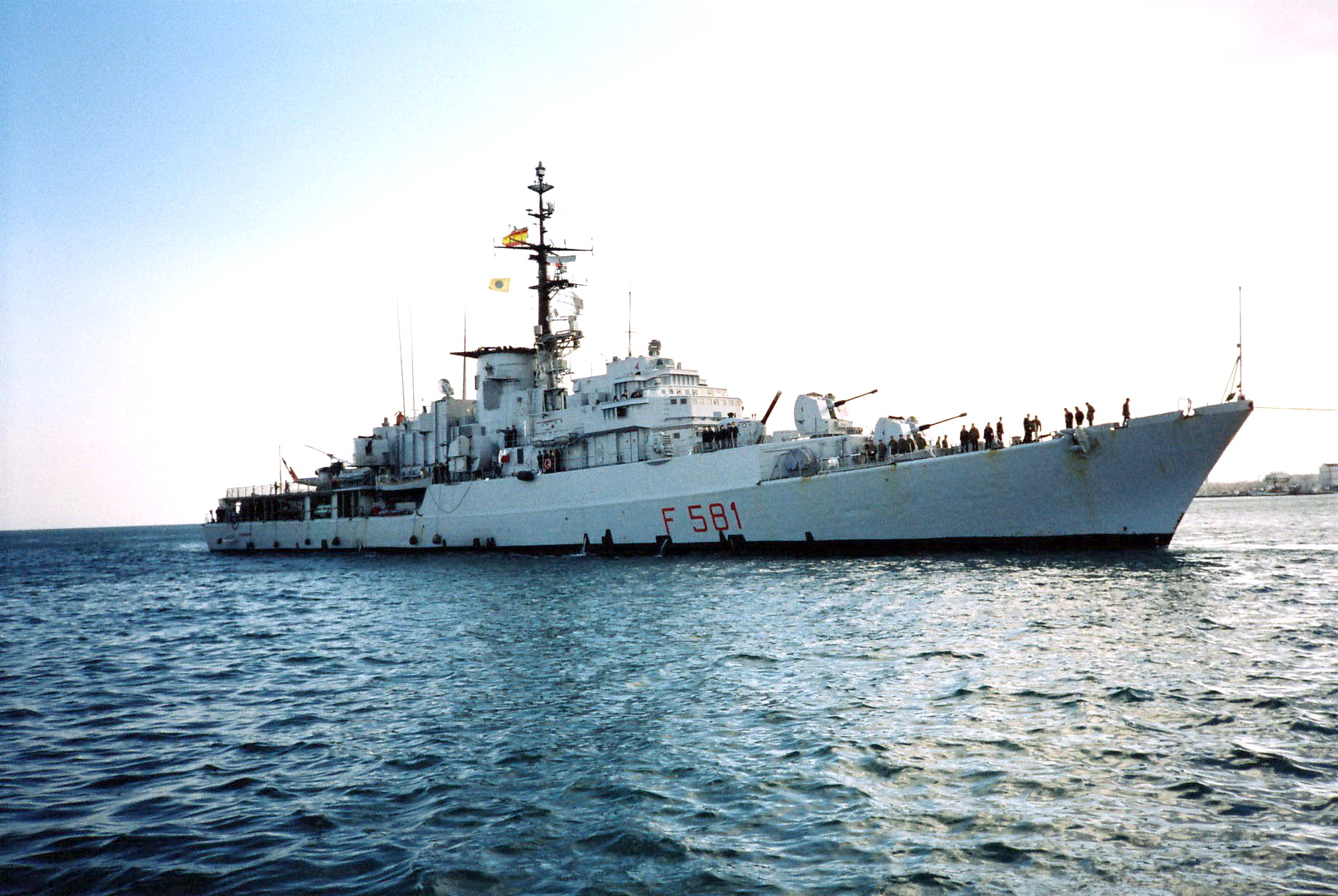
- Carabiniere (F 581)

Class overview
- Name: Alpino class
- Builders: Cantieri Navali Riuniti (CNR)
- Operators: Italian Navy
- Preceded by: Bergamini class
- Succeeded by: Lupo class
- In service: 1963–68
- In commission: 1968–97
- Planned: 4
- Completed: 2
- Cancelled: 2
- Retired: 2

General characteristics
- Type: Frigate
- Displacement: Standard: 2,000 long tons (2,032 t); Full load: 2,700 long tons (2,743 t)
- Length: 113.30 m (371 ft 9 in)
- Beam: 13.10 m (43 ft 0 in)
- Draught: 3.8 m (12 ft 6 in)
- Propulsion: 2-shaft CODAG system; 2 Tosi/Metrovick G6 gas turbines 15,000 shp (11,000 kW); 4 Tosi V12 QTV-320(-12) diesel engines 16,800 shp (12,500 kW)
- Speed: 29 kn (54 km/h; 33 mph) with gas turbines; 24 knots (44 km/h; 28 mph) with diesels only
- Range: 3,500 nmi (6,500 km; 4,000 mi) at 18 knots (33 km/h; 21 mph) (diesels)
- Complement: 263
- Sensors & processing systems: Radar: SPS-12 Search; SPQ-2 air/surface search/navigation; RTN-30X, RTN-10X fire control; Sonar: SQS-43 hull sonar; SQA-10 VDS
- Electronic warfare & decoys: SLQ-D ECM system
- Armament: 6 × Oto Melara 76 mm (3 in)/62 MMI; 1 × Menon ASW mortar; 2 × Mark 32 triple 324 mm (13 in) torpedo tubes
- Aircraft carried: 2 × AB-204 or AB-212ASW helicopters
- Aviation facilities: Telescopic hangar for 2 medium helicopters.

The Alpino class were a group of two frigates built for the Italian Navy during the Cold War.

== Design ==
The design was originally conceived as an enlarged version of the Canopo-class frigates. The design was however changed radically with a CODAG machinery suite comprising gas turbines and diesels. These ships introduced the use of ship-based helicopters and variable depth sonar into the Italian Navy.

The ships underwent significant modernisation in the 1980s with the fitting of new sonar and electronic warfare equipment.

== Ships ==
Initially four ships were planned to be ordered in 1959 to 1961. These ships were to be named Circe, Climene, Perseo and Polluce in honour of the World War II-era Spica-class torpedo boats of those names. These ships were postponed while the designs were updated and two ships were ordered in 1962. Both vessels were built by CNR in Riva Trigoso and named after types of soldiers and specifically after two World War II Soldati-class destroyers.

Ship	Pennant Number	Laid down	Launched	Commissioned	Decommissioned
Alpino	F 580	27 February 1963	10 June 1967	14 January 1968	31 March 2006
Carabiniere	F 581	9 January 1965	30 September 1967	28 April 1968	19 November 2008

The ships were used as auxiliary vessels from the mid-1990s. Carabiniere was used as a trials ship for new missiles (PAAMS) and radar.

== See also ==
- List of frigate classes by country

Equivalent frigates of the same era

- Van Speijk class
- Peder Skram class
- Condell class
- Brooke class
- Nilgiri class

== Sources ==
- Blackman, Raymond V.B. Jane's Fighting Ships 1971–72. London: Sampson Low, Marston & Co., Ltd, 1971. ISBN 0-354-00096-9.
- Gardiner, Roger and Stephen Chumbley. Conway's All the World's Fighting Ships 1947–1995. Annapolis, Maryland, USA, 1995. ISBN 1-55750-132-7.
- Moore, John. Jane's Fighting Ships 1985–86. London: Jane's Yearbooks, 1985. ISBN 0-7106-0814-4.
