= SMA-Segnalamento marittimo ed aereo =

Italian radar manufacturer

SMA - Segnalamento Marittimo e Aereo was an Italian radar manufacturer for naval, aerial and terrestrial use, in operation between 1943 and 1994.

Logo of SMA-Segnalamento Marittimo ed Aereo S.p.A.

== History ==
SMA was founded on August 2, 1943 in Florence by Giuseppe Salvini, Lorenzo Fernandes, Enrico Bocci. In 1949, they developed Italy's first radar equipment, with Nello Carrara.

In 1988, the EFIM public group purchased a majority interest in the company's capital, controlling 98.8% of the shares. Following the collapse of EFIM, in 1988, "SMA" was merged with Officine Galileo, part of Finmeccanica.
