= Menon (weapon) =

Type of anti-submarine mortar

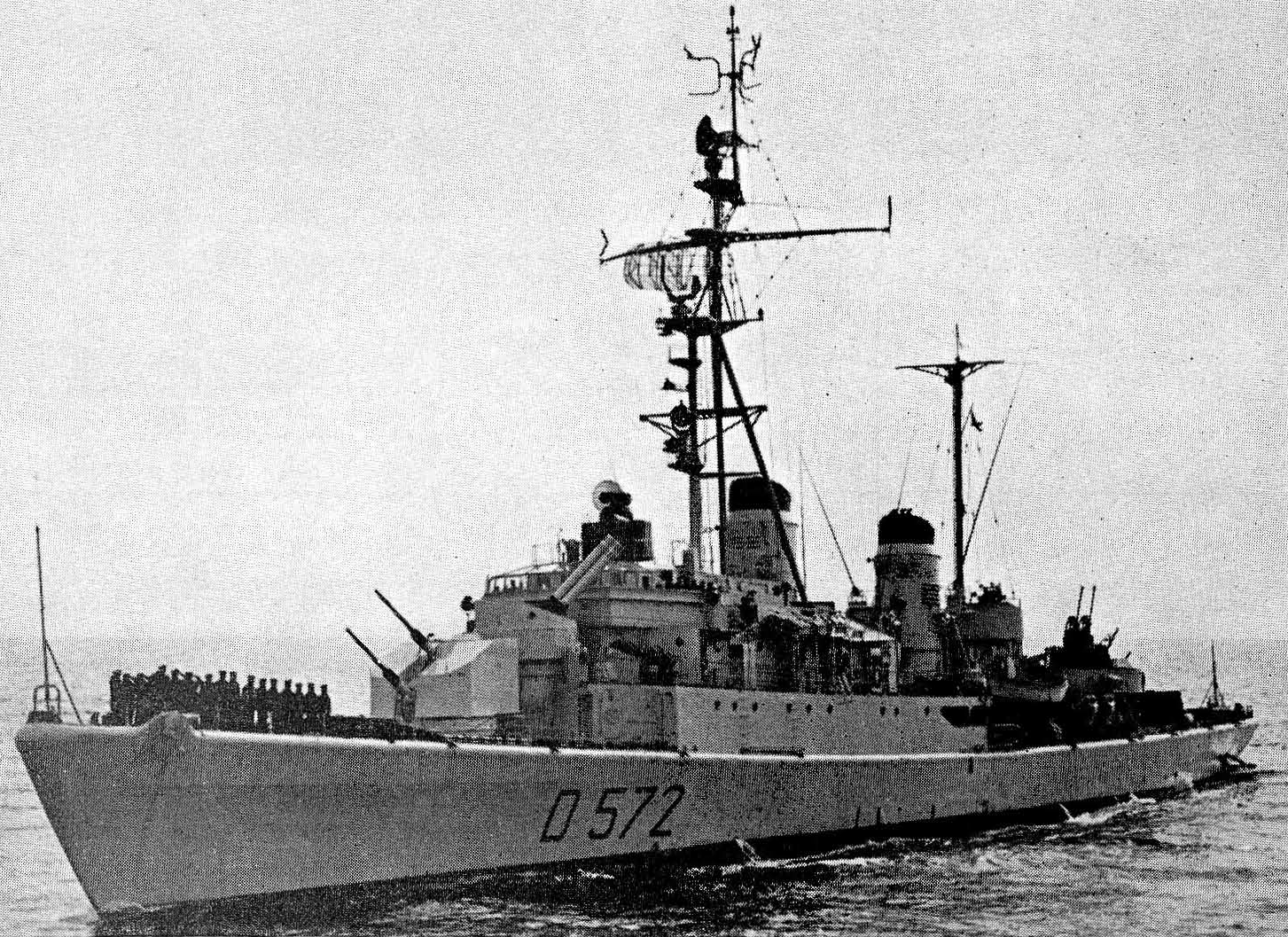
- A triple-barrel Menon ASW mortar mounted in front of the superstructure aboard the Italian frigate Cigno, 1959
- Type: Anti-submarine mortar
- Place of origin: Italy

Service history
- In service: 1956–1980s
- Used by: Italian Navy

Production history
- Produced: 1956–1960s
- Variants: Short barrelled

Specifications
- Crew: 3
- Shell: 160 kg (350 lb)
- Calibre: 305 mm (12 in)
- Barrels: 3
- Maximum firing range: 1,500 yd (1,372 m)

Menon was an anti-submarine mortar used by the Italian Navy during the Cold War. Introduced in 1956, it was used on the Centauro-class and Bergamini-class frigates and Impetuoso-class destroyers until their retirement in the 1980s.

== Description ==
The Menon system fired a 305-millimeter (12 in) projectile weighing 160 kilograms (350 lb) to a maximum range of 1,500 meters (4,900 ft). It fired 21 rounds in 70 seconds that covered an area of about 90 by 180 square yards (75 by 151 m^{2}).

The initial version consisted of a three-barrel mortar in a rotating, enclosed mounting that was usually positioned forward of the superstructure, but aft of the gun mounts. This was replaced by the K 113 weapon with a single 4.6-meter (15 ft 1 in) barrel in the same type of mounting, albeit with a fixed elevation of 45°. By varying the gas vent valves in the three powder chambers, the weapon had a range between 400 and 900 meters (440 and 980 yd). The K 113 fired a seven-round pattern, loaded automatically from a seven-round cylinder.

Short-barreled models were also used, although details are lacking.

== Bibliography ==
- Archer, Denis, ed. (1976). Jane's Pocket Book of Naval Armament. New York: Collier Books. OCLC 937976566.
- Friedman, Norman (1989). The Naval Institute Guide to World Naval Weapons Systems. Annapolis, Maryland: Naval Institute Press. ISBN 0-87021-793-3.
