= MM/SPQ-2 =

Naval radar system

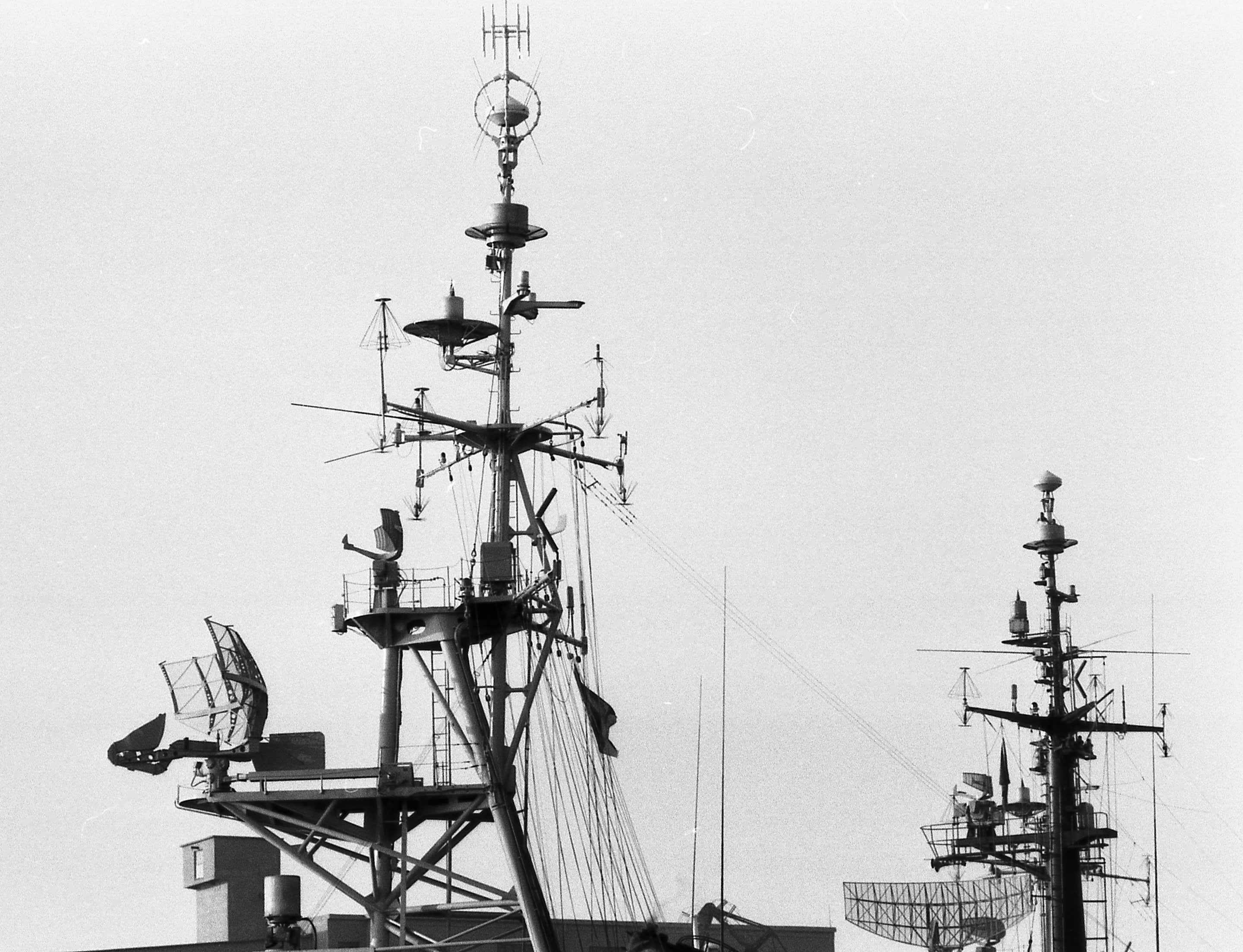
- MM/SPQ-2 mounted on Carabiniere on 12 March 1974
- Country of origin: Italy
- Manufacturer: Segnalamento Marittimo ed Sereo (SMA)
- Frequency: X-Band
- PRF: 1500–3000 pps (i) and 450–550 pps (ii)
- Beamwidth: 0.6° (horizontal)
- Pulsewidth: 0.15 microsec (i) and 1.5 microsec (ii)
- RPM: 40 rpm
- Range: 74 km (46 mi)
- Diameter: 3 m (9.8 ft)
- Power: 20 kW peak

The MM/SPQ-2 was an Italian naval radar produced by SMA. It was a multifunction radar performing the functions of surface and low altitude search as well as navigation. The radar equipped many ships of the Italian Navy, including the Alpino-class frigates, Andrea Doria-class cruisers, Audace-class destroyers, Bergamini-class frigates and Vittorio Veneto, and, in its upgraded SPQ-2D form, was exported to Canada for the Iroquois-class destroyers. It was developed into the MM/SPS-702 and MM/SPS-703.
