= Mark 44 torpedo =

US light-weight anti-submarine torpedo

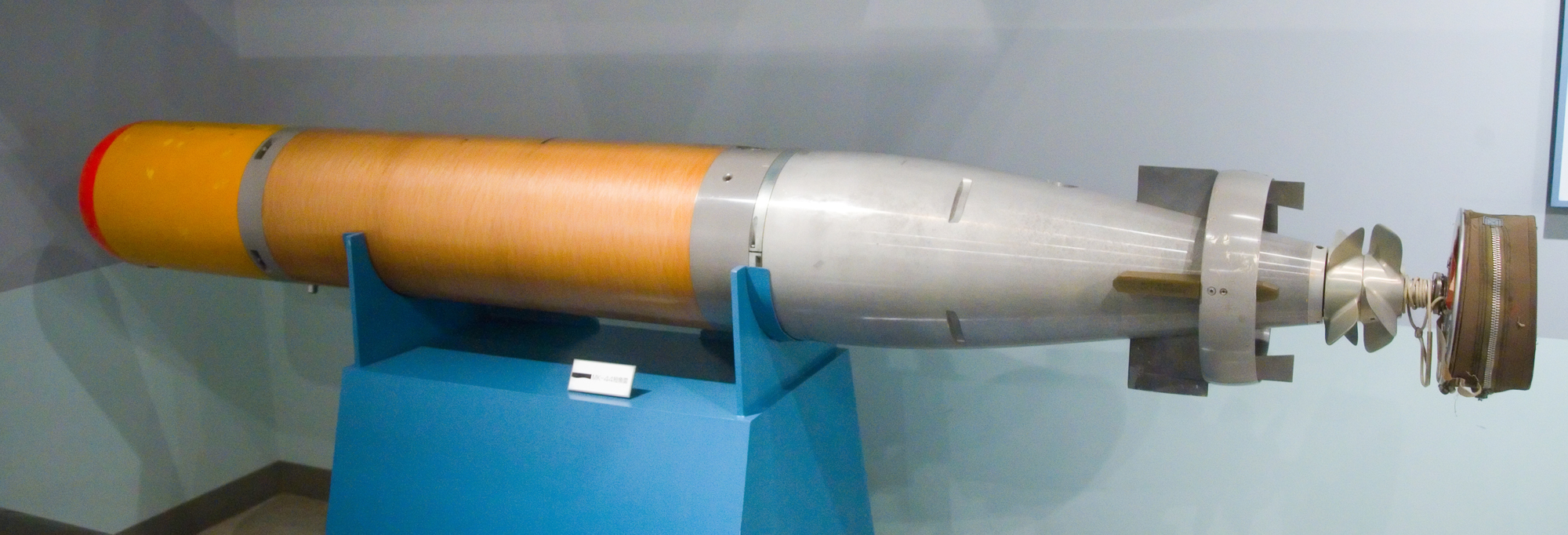
- A Japanese built Mk44 torpedo at the Kanoya Air Base Museum, Japan
- Type: Antisubmarine torpedo
- Place of origin: United States

Service history
- In service: 1957-1967 (with United States Navy)
- Used by: See Operators

Production history
- Designer: Naval Ordnance Test Station Pasadena; General Electric
- Designed: 1953
- Manufacturer: General Electric; Naval Ordnance Station Forest Park; American Machine and Foundry
- Variants: Mark 44 Mod 1

Specifications
- Mass: 432 pounds (196 kg)
- Length: 8.2 feet (2.5 m)
- Diameter: 12.75 inches (32.4 cm)
- Muzzle velocity: 123 metres per second (400 ft/s)
- Effective firing range: 123 metres (135 yd)
- Warhead: Mk 101 Mod 0, HBX-3
- Warhead weight: 75 pounds (34 kg)
- Detonation mechanism: Mk 19 type Mod 12 contact exploder
- Engine: Electric; 30 horsepower (22 kW)
- Operational range: 3.4 miles (5.5 km)
- Maximum depth: 1,000 feet (300 m)
- Maximum speed: 30 knots (56 km/h; 35 mph)
- Guidance system: Helix search
- Launch platform: Destroyers and aircraft

The Mark 44 torpedo is a now-obsolete air-launched and ship-launched lightweight torpedo manufactured in the United States, and under licence in Canada, France, Italy, Japan and the United Kingdom, with 10,500 being produced for U.S. service. It was superseded by the Mark 46 torpedo, beginning in the late 1960s. The Royal Australian Navy, however, continued to use it alongside its successor for a number of years, because the Mark 44 was thought to have superior performance in certain shallow-water conditions.

It has been deployed by many navies and air forces including the USN, Royal Navy, Royal Australian Navy and the Royal Air Force from various launch vehicles. These include long-range maritime patrol aircraft, e.g. P-3 Orion, RAF Nimrod, Canadair Argus, LAMPS and other embarked naval helicopters, ASROC missiles, Ikara missiles.

== Development ==
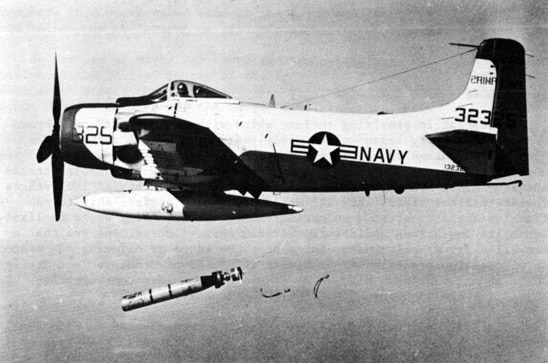
AD-4 Skyraider launching Mark 44 torpedo

During the 1950s the US Navy ordered development of a new generation of lightweight anti-submarine torpedoes. Two programs were started, the EX-2A at the Naval Ordnance Test Station Pasadena (NOTS-Pasadena) and the EX-2B at General Electric Ordnance Department, Pittsfield, Massachusetts. The EX-2A was to have its counter-rotating propeller driven directly by an electric motor, while the EX-2B was to use a gas turbine connected to a gearbox.

After an accident with the proposed fuel for the EX-2B (Propyl Nitrate) the US Navy ordered the halting of its use. This resulted in the EX-2B development team shifting to an electric motor using the design for a jet engine starter motor as the basis to give the high torque and RPM the counter-rotating gearbox needed. The shroud design around the control surfaces of the EX-2B was also redesigned, as it was discovered that having the shroud around the control surfaces themselves reduced their effectiveness, as a result the length of the shroud was reduced.

After several evaluations the EX-2B was selected and designated the Mark 44 Mod 0. After some fine tuning of the design, an enhanced version the Mark 44 Mod 1 entered United States service in 1956. However shortly after the torpedo entered service it became apparent that newer Soviet submarines were both faster and deeper diving, and could potentially both outrun and out-dive the Mk.44 which was designed to attack targets with a maximum speed of only 17 knots. To address this an operational requirement was issued in 1960 resulting in the acceptance into service of the Mk.46 torpedo in 1963, when it began to replace the Mk.44 in U.S. service.

A number of upgrade packages have been offered for the torpedo, a 1986 Honeywell kit replaced the magnetostrictive transducers with ceramic transducers in a planar array, and the replacement of the analogue guidance electronics with a digital system. The overall effect of these changes was to triple the searched volume of the torpedo by increasing detection range by 75% and reducing the minimum shallow water search depth by 47%. With this modification the torpedo is known in South Korea as the KT44.

A South African package offered an extensive upgrade, replacing the warhead with a 45 kilogram shaped charge device capable of penetrating 40 millimeters of steel behind a 1.5 meter water filled double hull. The package also included a comprehensive digital electronics upgrade tripling the target acquisition range to 1,000 meters in ideal conditions, and containing a number of counter-counter measures along with a variety of attack modes.

The torpedo is, however, coming to the end of its usable life as the batteries have expired in many of the torpedoes. The New Zealand navy retired its Mark 44s in 1993 because it decided against renewing the batteries.

== Description ==
The Mark 44 is a modular design, consisting of four main sections. The blunt nose contains the active sonar seeker with the 75-pound (34 kg) high-explosive warhead immediately behind it. The second section contains the guidance and gyroscopes. The third contains the 24 kilowatt seawater battery which uses silver chloride and magnesium electrodes with seawater acting as the electrolyte. Finally is the propulsion section which houses the electric motor, four rectangular control fins and two contra-rotating propellers.

The vacuum tube-based guidance system is more sophisticated than earlier torpedoes, using pre-launch settings enabling an initial search depth of 50, 150, 250, 450, 650 or 900 feet (15, 46, 76, 137, 198 or 274 m) as well as a search floor at 150, 250, 450, 650 or 900 feet (46, 76, 137, 198 or 274 m) as well as a maximum dive/climb angle of 4.5, 6 or 7 degrees. On impacting the water the torpedo either runs out for 1,000 yards (910 m) or performs a dive at a 30-degree angle to the search depth. After completing this it may perform a flat turn and begins a helical search pattern proceeding up or down until it hits either the minimum depth of 50 yards (46 m) or the search floor. When it hits either top or bottom, it performs a flat turn and begins to execute the search in reverse. It continues executing this search until it either finds a target or exhausts its six-minute endurance.

The guidance system could drive the active sonar at either a slow rate or a fast rate, which it used when the target drew near to obtain a precise proximity and rate of closure.

The air dropped version of the torpedo is fitted with a parachute retarding system to slow entry into the water, and the nose is protected from the impact by a fairing which is immediately discarded upon entering the water. The propellers are covered by a ring fairing.

== Variants ==
- Mark 44 mod 0 - initial pre-production variant
- Mark 44 mod 1 - initial production version
- Mark 44 mod 2
- Mark 44 mod 3
- Mark 44 mod 4

== Operators ==
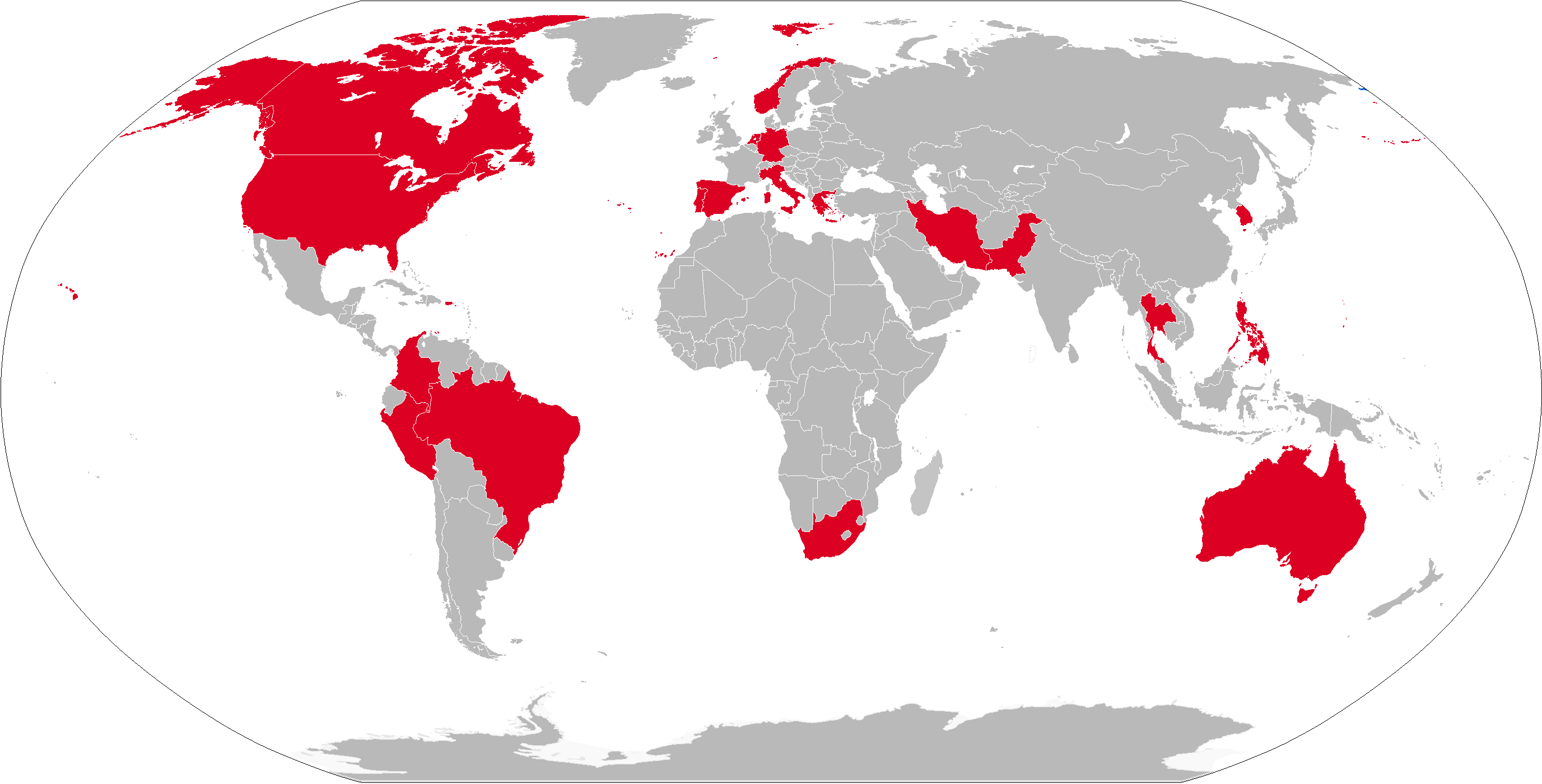
Map with former Mark 44 operators in red

=== Former operators ===
- Argentina
- Australia
- Brazil
- Canada
- Chile
- Colombia
- France
- West Germany
- Greece
- Indonesia
- Iran
- Italy
- Japan
- Netherlands
- New Zealand
- Norway
- Pakistan
- Peru
- Philippines
- Portugal
- South Korea
- South Africa
- Spain
- Thailand
- United States

== Specifications ==
- Length: 8.2 feet
- Diameter: 12.75 inches
- Weight: 432 lbs
- Range: 3.4 miles
- Speed: 30 knots
- Depth range: 50 to 1,000 yards
- Target detection range: 1,000 yards
- Warhead: 75 lbs high explosive
- Propulsion: 30 hp electric motor driven by seawater battery
