= Italian destroyer Audace =

Audace was the name of at least three ships of the Italian Navy and may refer to:

- Italian destroyer Audace (1913), an Audace-class destroyer launched in 1913 and sunk in a collision in 1916.
- Italian destroyer Audace (1916), a destroyer ordered for Japan from Yarrow as Kawakaze transferred to Italy while building renamed Intrepido then Audace. Seized by Germany 1943, renamed TA20 and sunk in 1944.
- Italian destroyer Audace (D 551), an Audace-class destroyer launched in 1971 and decommissioned in 2006.
