= Italian ship Ardito =

Ardito was the name of at least three ships of the Italian Navy and may refer to:

- Italian destroyer Ardito (1912), an Ardito-class destroyer launched in 1912 and discarded in 1931.
- Italian torpedo boat Ardito, a Ciclone-class torpedo boat launched in 1942. Seized by Germany and renamed TA26 in September 1943. She was sunk in 1944.
- Italian destroyer Ardito (D 550), an Audace-class destroyer launched in 1971 and decommissioned in 2006.
