= Libyan missile attack against Lampedusa =

Short Libyan-Italian military confrontation

Libyan attack on Lampedusa
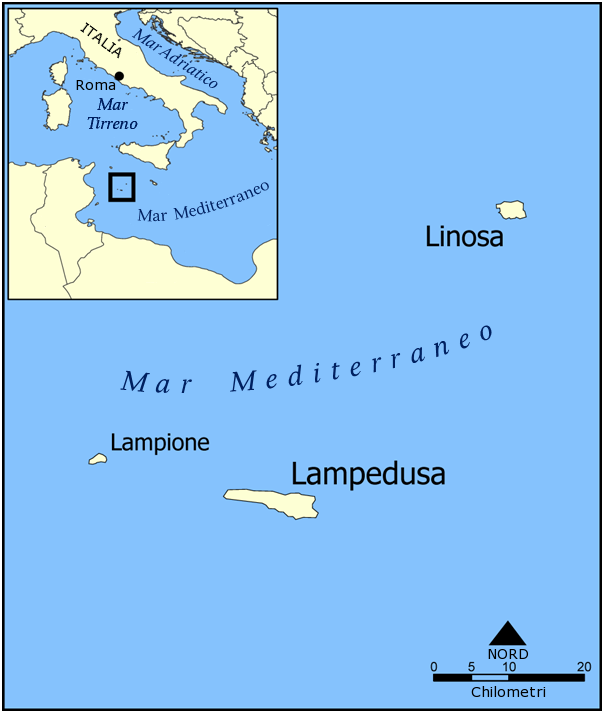
- The Pelagian Islands, attacked by the Libyan Arab Jamahiriya
Date	15 April 1986 – 16 April 1986
Location	Lampedusa, Republic of Italy

Belligerents
Libyan Arab Jamahiriya	Italy; United States

The Libyan missile attack against Lampedusa, Italy, was initiated at 16:33 on 15 April 1986, and, despite not having caused any damage, kick-started a period of diplomatic crisis between the nations of Italy and Libya.

Two SS-1 Scud were launched against Lampedusa by the Libyan Armed Forces, to damage the NATO base located in Lampedusa, including the LORAN navigation system located on the base, as a reprisal against Operation El Dorado Canyon.

== Background ==
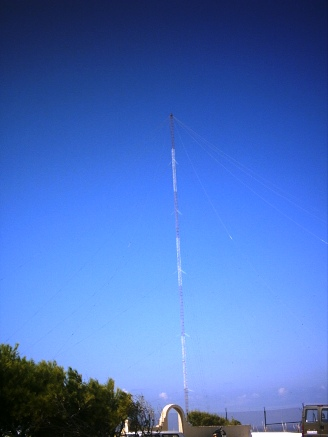
A 192 m (630 ft) tall military antenna of the United States Coast Guard, located in Lampedusa.

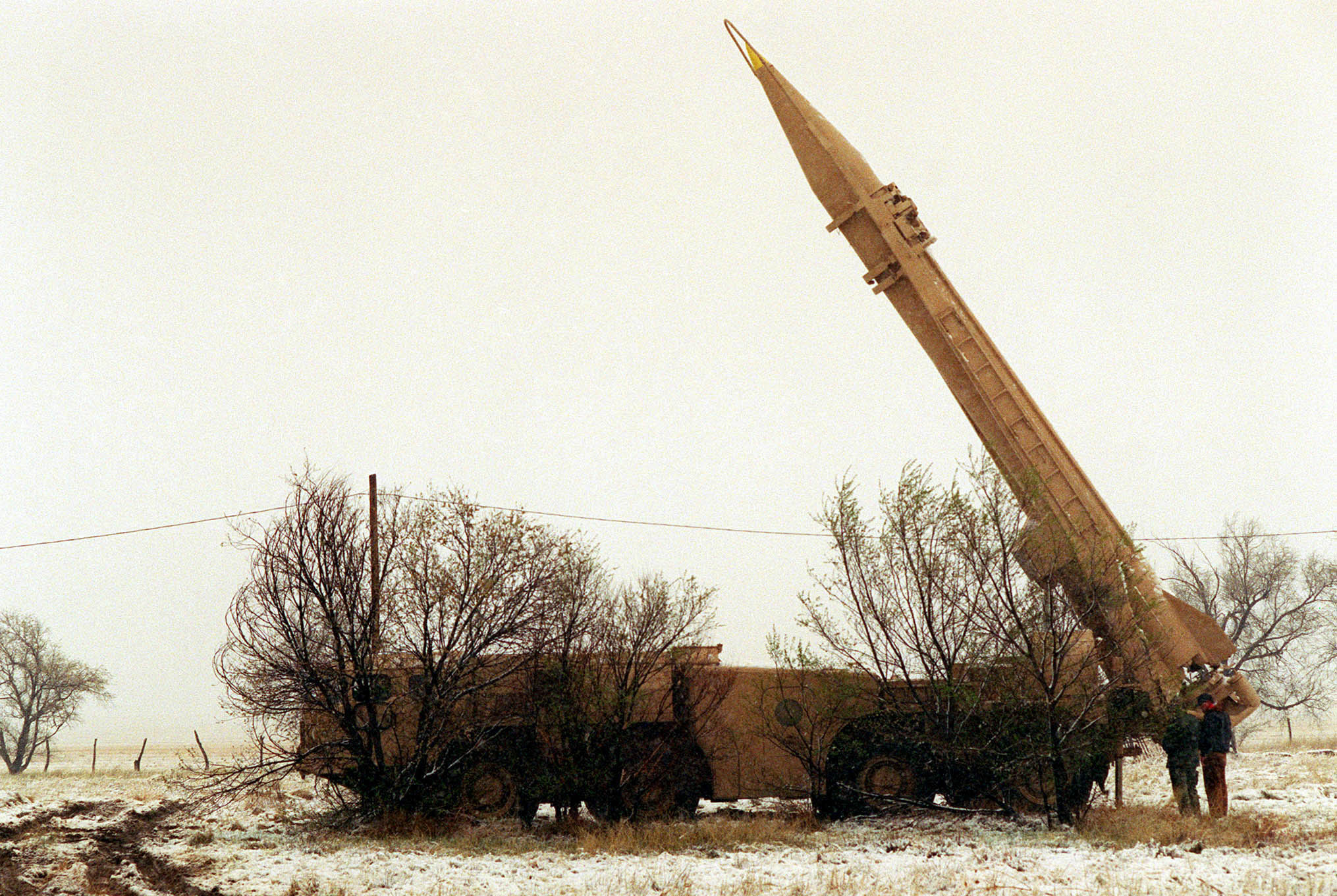
Un lanciatore SCUD usato in una esercitazione negli Stati Uniti nel 1997.

Between 1985 and 1986 various diplomatic and military tension was built up between Italy, the United States and Libya. Between 24 and 25 March 1986, In the Gulf of Sidra, a naval and air warfare operation by the United States took place against Libya. On 14 April 1986, the evening before the Libyan missile attack on Lampedusa, the United States launched three air strikes on Libya to eliminate President Muammar Gaddafi. The code name of the operation was "El Dorado Canyon". Twenty-four US bomber aircraft attacked the Libyan capital, Tripoli, and six other targets, destroying the residence of Muammar Gaddafi in an operation initiated by President Ronald Reagan, in response to the West Berlin discotheque bombing in Berlin on 5 April 1986, frequented by US soldiers in Germany, with a toll of three dead and 250 wounded.

Gaddafi escaped the bombings, but among the victims of the US bombings, the alleged victims were Hana Gaddafi, one of his 15-month-old adopted daughters, and dozens of civilian victims. The US planes had taken off from the United Kingdom , and the aircraft carriers USS America and USS Coral Sea, which were cruising in the Gulf of Sidra.

== Missile attack on Lampedusa ==
Lampedusa was home to a United States Coast Guard LORAN center "LO.RA.N.-C Slave Synchronization and Transmission Station "Mediterranean Sea / Lampedusa" ("Xray"), located at Capo Ponente. A 16:33 UTC on 15 April 1986, various residents of Lampedusa heard loud noises. The first assessment on the situation stated that the loud noises were likely from a Libyan patrol boat, and then it was speculated that it was an aerial attack. Eventually, it was identified as a missile attack. The commander in charge of the radio station, Lieutenant Ernest Del Bueno, evacuated all the U.S. personnel from the station, however he ordered the Italian one to stay behind.

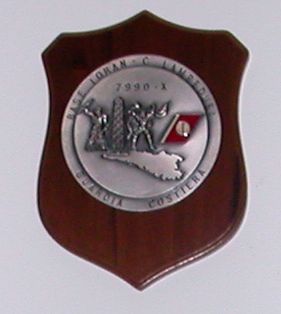
Coat of arms of the Italian Coast Guard military base "SYNCHRONIZATION AND TRANSMISSION STATION LO.RA.N.-C SLAVE "Mediterranean Sea / Lampedusa" (Xray) The handover between the U.S. Coast Guard and the Coast Guard took place on 1 January 1995.

The news of the evacuation of the US military sent the islanders into a panic, and they moved out of the town, occupying the old "dammusi" and the shelter tunnels dug into the rock during World War II. At around 18:00, the US authorities informed the Italian Minister of Defence, Giovanni Spadolini, that Muammar Gaddafi had ordered the launch of two Soviet manufactured SS-1c Scud B - R-300 9K72 Elbrus missiles against the island of Lampedusa. The missiles landed in the nearby sea without causing any damages, the first exploding two kilometres (1.2 mi) northwest and the second two kilometres southwest from the Capo Ponente base. The then Air Brigadier General Mario Arpino, Head of the 3rd "Aerospace Forces Planning" Department of the Italian Air Force General Staff, from January 1986 to September 1987, recalled those events in a 2005 interview:

M.A.«In the aftermath of the Lampedusa crisis, Cottone tasked me, on behalf of the Government of the Italian Republic, with studying retaliation against Libya in the event of further hostile actions. We prepared a series of possible plans.» - G.D.F.: «But did our radars spot the Scuds?» - M.A.: «Our radars were not capable of detecting missiles of that kind. We had asked NATO to provide us with AWACS, very powerful flying radars, but they were granted to us until months after the incident.» - G.D.F.: «Only the U.S. satellites, therefore, could see the Scuds: only the U.S. space eyes that at that time were keeping the entire Strait of Sicily under control. But to whom did Washington transmit the satellite data?» - M.A.: «The Americans never interfered at the operational level: I was in charge of the crisis room, and they didn't tell me anything about what was going down. If they informed anyone, it was only for some political gain. I know for certain that we weren't even warned about the raid against Tripoli. I remember the surprise that night when our radar detected the planes heading for Libya.».

The Libyans claimed that they had indeed actually pursued the attack 24 hours after the incident on 16 April 1986, using Abdulrahaman Shalgam as to communicate such operation was real:

The missiles were indeed from Libya; however, we were not attempting to target Italy, but rather a US-led NATO base.

== Theories ==
On 20 September 2005, the Air squadron general Basilio Cottone, who was present during the events and at the time of the interview, was also the lead of the Italian Air Force, stated:

Personalmente non ho mai creduto che siano stati lanciati missili da parte libica contro il territorio italiano. Ma, poiché allora tutti lo credevano ho ritenuto di operare di conserva. La notizia del lancio dei missili per me era falsa e le azioni messe in atto volevano accreditarla. Molte organizzazioni extranazionali erano allora interessate al fatto che il governo italiano adottasse una politica di più forte chiusura nei confronti della Libia.

General Arpino, according to an article of the L'Espresso newspaper stated:

Doubts regarding the events of that day were always present. We never truly found empiric proof of the attack: Not even a splinter.

The statement by Basilio Cottone, not sustained by any kind of source, was later disproven by the Libyan government and Giulio Andreotti, who in 2005, during his tenure as the minister of foreign affairs, commented that:

I was not scared at all. The vibe was that the missiles were launched never to cause any damage in the first place.

== Operation Girasole (Operation Sunflower) ==
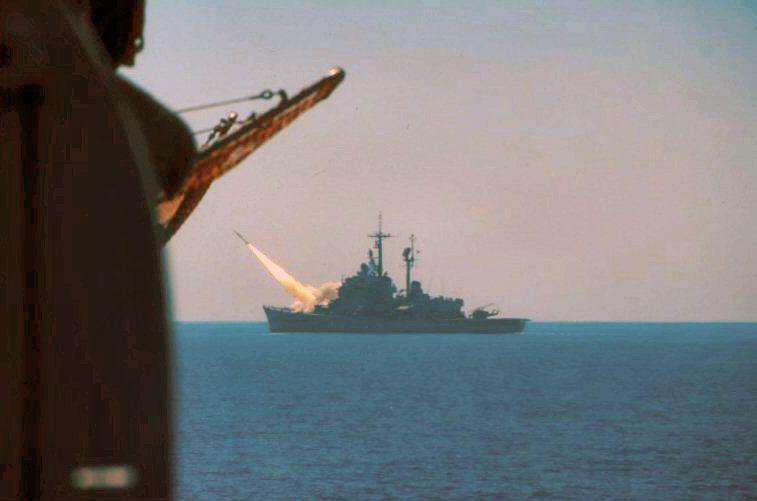
Italian cruiser Andrea Doria

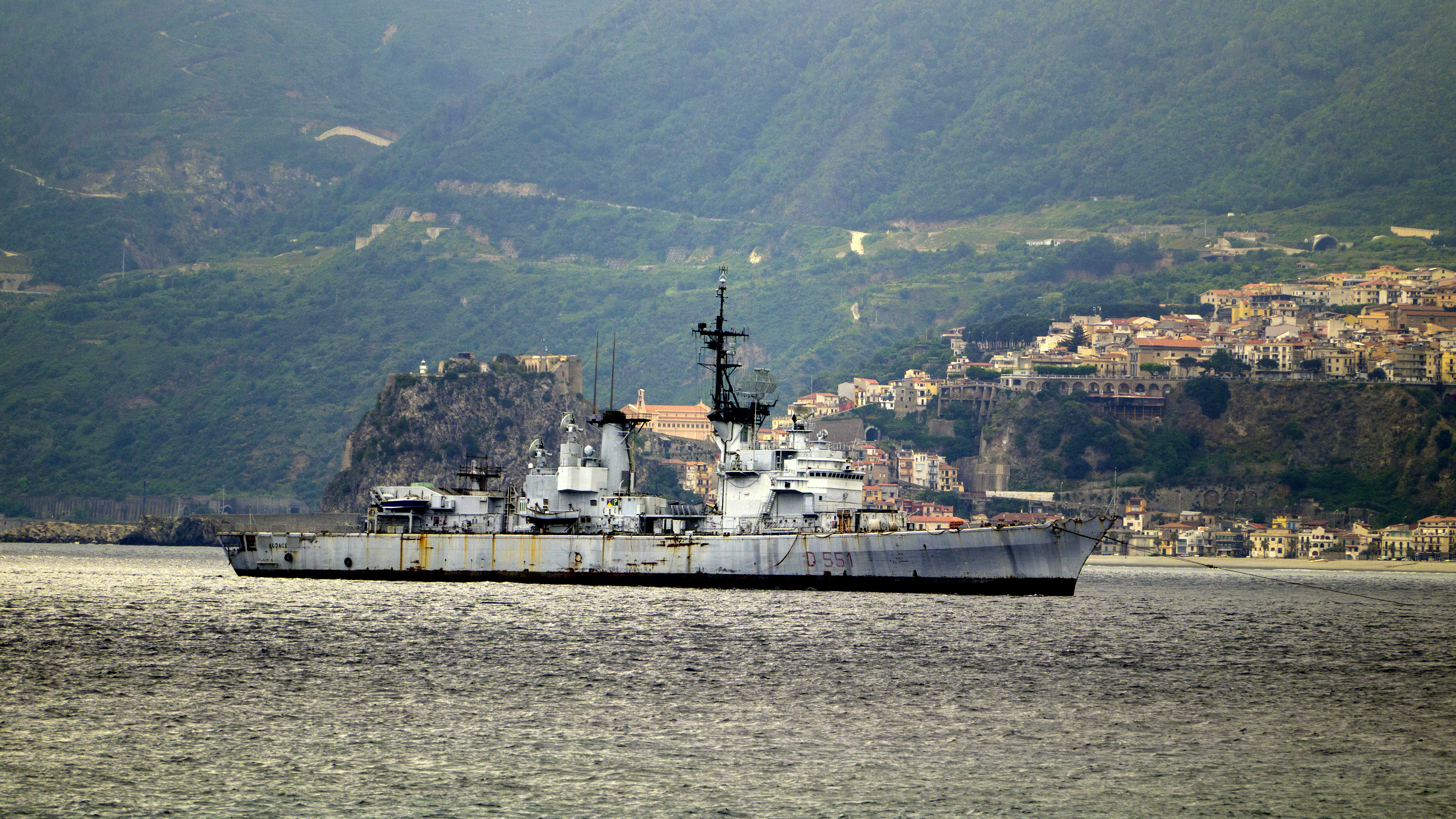
Italian destroyer Audace

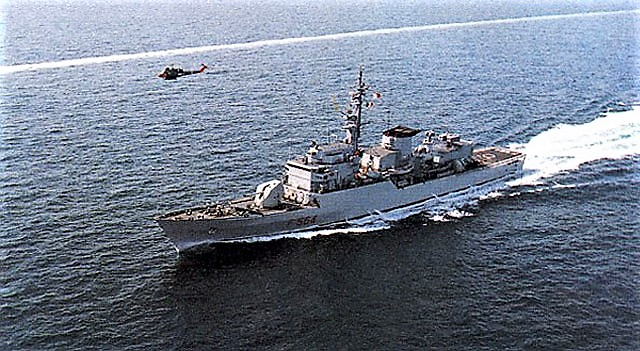
Frigate Lupo

At sunrise of 16 April 1986, the island of Lampedusa saw the mobilization of the Italian military units from the Paratroopers Brigade Folgore; among others, a component of the 1st Carabinieri Paratroopers Regiment "Tuscania" was deployed. Operation Girasole began immediately and lasted until July 1986. Its purpose was to patrol Italian territorial waters and the Strait of Sicily with a naval squadron composed of the following units of the Italian Navy:

- Cruiser Andrea Doria;
- Guided-missile destroyer Audace;
- Frigate Lupo.
- Frigate Libeccio
- Destroyer Intrepido
- Supply ship Stromboli

The Italian Air Force provided escort for civilian aircraft to and from the smaller islands with F-104 fighter jets, carried out reconnaissance activities with Panavia Tornado, and contributed to patrolling the area with Bréguet 1150 Atlantic. It also transported Army units stationed in Lampedusa with C-130H and G.222 aircraft and, as a precaution, kept a Tornado fighter-bomber alert cell on standby at Pantelleria airport, where the MB.339s were also redeployed.

== See also ==
- Lampedusa Airport
- Italy–Libya relations
