= Impavido =

Impavido or Impávido may refer to:

- Impavido, a brand name for the drug miltefosine
- Impávido, the Spanish title for the Spanish film Poker Face (2012 film)
- Italian ship Impavido, various Italian naval ships
- Impavido-class destroyer, a class of Italian Navy guided-missile destroyers
