= Italian ship Cassiopea =

Cassiopea has been borne by at least three ships of the Italian Navy and may refer to:

- Italian torpedo boat Cassiopea (1906), a Pegaso-class torpedo boat launched in 1906 and discarded in 1927.
- Italian torpedo boat Cassiopea (1936), a Spica-class torpedo boat launched in 1936 and stricken in 1959.
- Italian patrol vessel Cassiopea (P 401), a Cassiopea-class patrol vessel launched in 1988.
