= Italian ship Vega =

Vega has been borne by at least two ships of the Italian Navy and may refer to:

- Italian torpedo boat Vega, a Spica-class torpedo boat launched in 1936 and sunk in 1941.
- Italian patrol vessel Vega (P 404), a Cassiopea-class patrol vessel launched in 1990.
