= Italian frigate Carabiniere (F 581) =

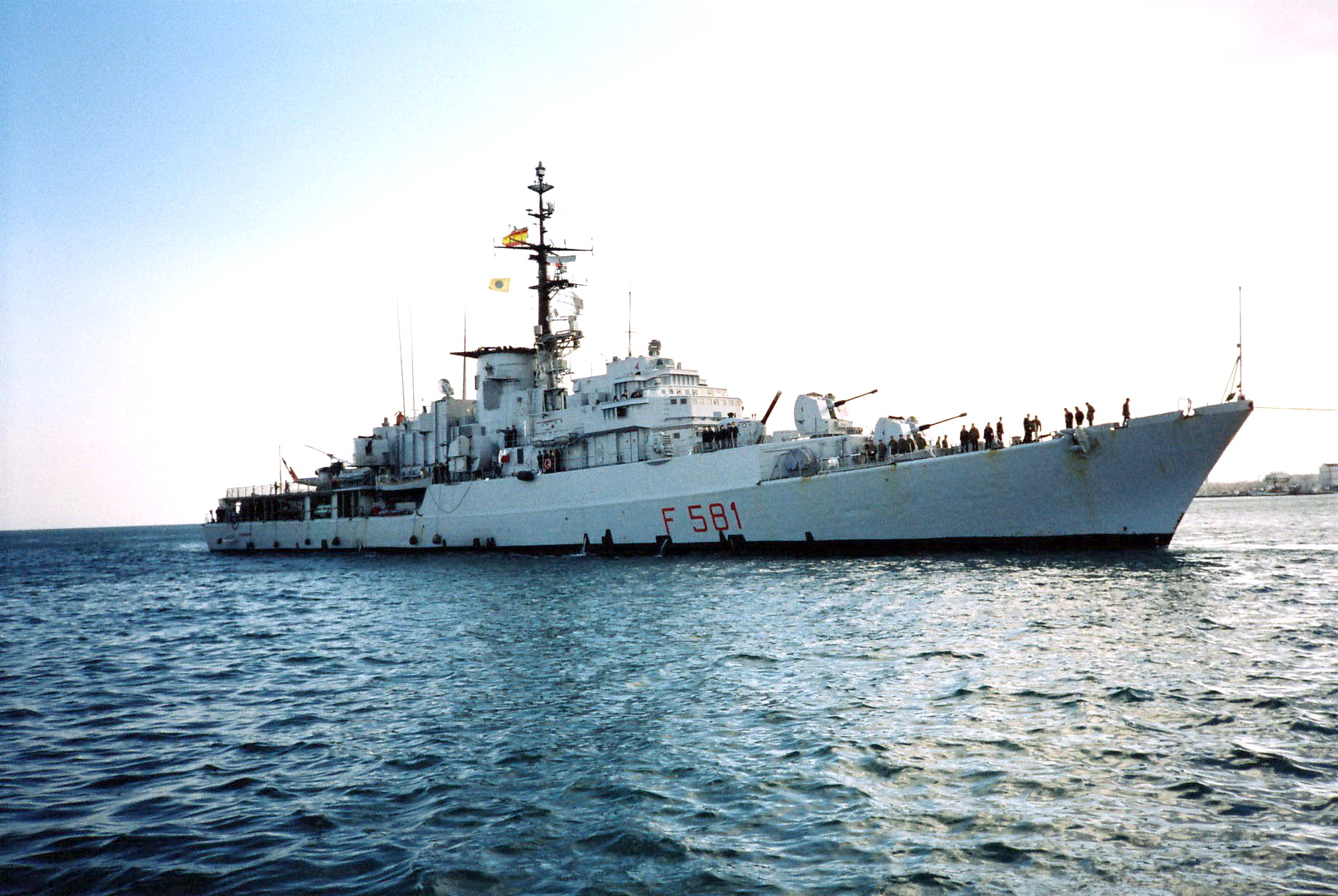
- Carabiniere docked in Málaga in April 1989

History

Italy
- Name: Carabiniere
- Namesake: Carabiniere
- Ordered: 1959
- Builder: Cantieri Navali Riuniti (CNR), Riva Trigoso, Genoa
- Laid down: 9 January 1965
- Launched: 30 September 1967
- Commissioned: 28 April 1968
- Decommissioned: 19 November 2008
- Motto: Italian: Nei secoli fedele “Faithful throughout the centuries”

General characteristics as built
- Type: Frigate
- Displacement: Standard: 2,000 long tons (2,032 t); Full load: 2,700 long tons (2,743 t)
- Length: 113.30 m (371 ft 9 in)
- Beam: 13.10 m (43 ft 0 in)
- Draught: 3.8 m (12 ft 6 in)
- Propulsion: 2-shaft CODAG; 2 Tosi-Metrovick gas turbines 15,000 shp (11,000 kW); 4 Tosi diesel engines 16,800 shp (12,500 kW)
- Speed: 28 kn (52 km/h; 32 mph) with gas turbines and diesels; 24 kn (44 km/h; 28 mph) with diesels only
- Range: 3,500 nmi (6,500 km; 4,000 mi) at 18 knots (33 km/h; 21 mph) (diesels)
- Complement: 13 officers and 130 ratings
- Sensors & processing systems: Radar: SPS-12 air search; SPQ-2 air/surface search/navigation; RTN-30, 3 RTN-10X Orion fire control; Sonar: SQS-43 hull sonar; SQA-10 VDS
- Armament: 6 × Oto Melara 76 mm (3 in)/62 Allargato anti-aircraft gun; 1 × 305 mm (12 in) Menon anti-submarine mortar; 2 × Mark 32 triple 324 mm (13 in) torpedo tubes for Mark 44 torpedoes
- Aircraft carried: 2 × AB-204 or AB-212ASW helicopters
- Aviation facilities: Telescopic hangar for 2 medium helicopters.

Carabiniere was a frigate operated by the Italian Navy. Launched in 1967, the vessel served in the anti-submarine role during the Cold War until 1992. The ship was then recommissioned as a testing platform for new weapons systems, including Aster, finally retiring in 2008.

== Design ==
The ships of the Alpino-class frigate were authorised in the 1959/1960 Italian naval programme. The second ship in the class, Climene, was laid down in 1963 but was renamed Carabiniere in June 1965 prior to being launched in 1967. Carabiniere was the third vessel in Italian service to be so named.

=== Armament ===
As originally designed, Climene was to have armament based on the preceding Bergamini-class frigate. Optimised for anti-submarine warfare, the vessel was designed around a hangar for an Agusta-Bell AB.204 helicopter. Close-in anti-submarine defence was provided by six 324 mm (13 in) Mark 44 torpedoes launched from Mark 32 torpedo tubes complemented by a single-barrel 305 mm (12 in) Menon mortar mounted forward. An early drawing shows the hangar straddled by a pair of 40 mm (1.6 in) guns with a single 76 mm (3 in) gun mounted fore and aft to provide anti-aircraft defence. By 1962, the efficacy of the 40 mm was in doubt and the design was redrawn with three 76 mm guns, but even this was deemed insufficient. At launch, the vessel had no less than six single mounts.

=== Propulsion ===
The propulsion system used a combined diesel and gas (CODAG) system as first trialled on the destroyer San Giorgio. Two diesels and one gas turbine were allied per shaft with a hydraulic coupling to enable the vessel to either run on diesel power alone, at low speed, or diesels, at high speed, and gas turbines simultaneously. Two 4,200 shp (3,100 kW) Tosi OTV-320 diesels were paired with each 7,500 shp (5,600 kW) Tosi-Metrovick G.6 gas turbine to provide a maximum speed of 20 kn (37 km/h; 23 mph) on diesels alone and 28 kn (52 km/h; 32 mph) with all engines running.

== Service ==
=== Anti-submarine frigate ===
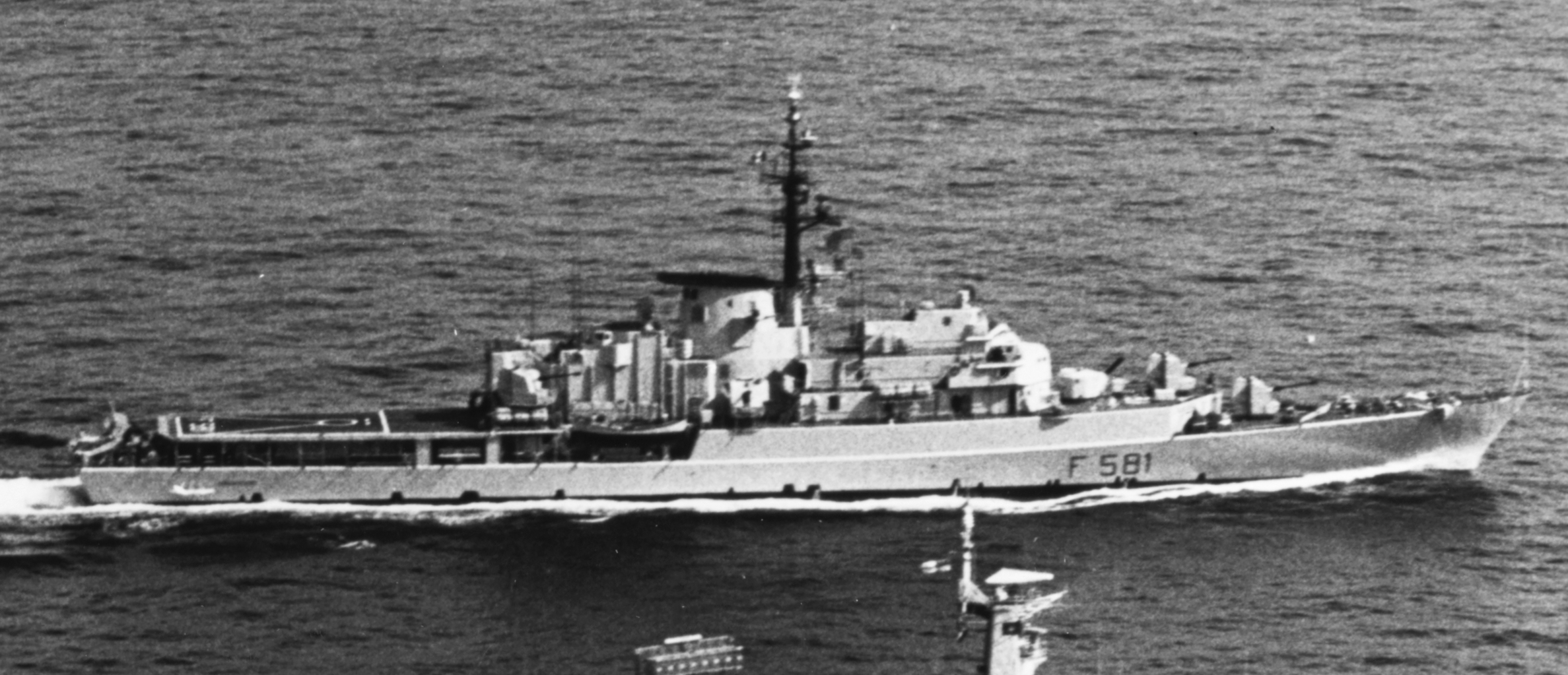
Carabiniere underway in the Mediterranean in 1979

Commissioned on 28 April 1968, Carabiniere served with the 1º Gruppo Navale d'Altura based at La Spezia. In 1973, when the school ship Amerigo Vespucci was inactive due to maintenance, Carabiniere was one of a number of Italian naval vessels used as a summer school cruise ship for students at the Italian Naval Academy. The vessel subsequently visited Istanbul, Odessa and Sevastopol alongside the destroyer Impavido.

During the 1970s, the ship was updated. The helicopters were replaced by the more capable AB-212ASW and a SLQ-A ECM system was added. The ship was further upgraded in the 1980s. Hull-mounted sonar and the SLQ-747 ECM suite was fitted.

=== Weapons testing ship ===
On 1 April 1992, the ship was decommissioned and re-equipped as a testing platform for a new generation of Italian naval weapons such as Aster and MILAS. The gas turbine, Menon mortar, variable depth sonar and five 76 mm mounts, along with two fire control radars, were removed. Removing the gas turbines restricted the top speed to 20 kn (37 km/h; 23 mph). Helicopter operating capability was also disabled. A SPY-702 search radar was installed along with Sylver missile launchers. The most obvious change was the installation of a large antenna midships for the EMPAR radar (also known as AN/SPY-790) which used the space previously occupied by the gas turbine exhaust. This combination of systems enabled Carabiniere to act as a testbed for PAAMS and SAAM-IT.

Carabiniere re-entered service on 31 December 1994 as a dedicated test ship but retained the penant designation of a frigate. The vessel undertook successful live firing trials of both Aster 15 from Sylver A-43 launchers and Aster 30 from Sylver A-50 launchers.

Carabiniere was finally decommissioned on 19 November 2008 in the presence of the Naval Chief of Staff Paolo La Rosa and Head of the Carabiniere Gianfrancesco Siazzu.
