= Italian destroyer Ardito (D 550) =

Audace-class guided missile destroyer

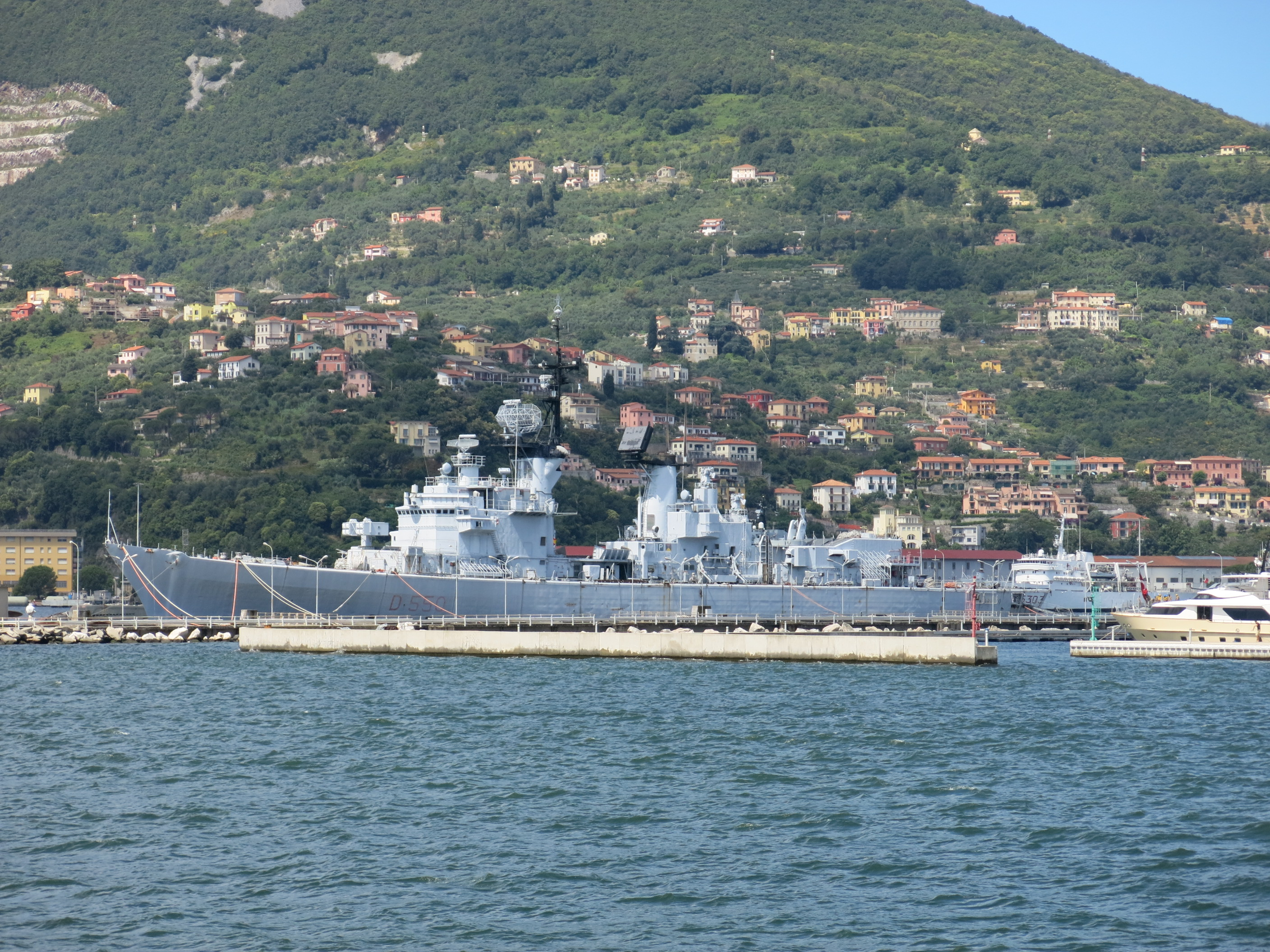
- Ardito in La Spezia on 20 June 2016.

History

Italy
- Name: Ardito
- Namesake: Ardito
- Operator: Italian Navy
- Builder: Cantiere navale di Castellammare di Stabia
- Laid down: 19 July 1968
- Launched: 27 November 1971
- Commissioned: 5 December 1972
- Decommissioned: 28 September 2006
- Identification: Pennant number: D 550; ITU Call Sign: IARD
- Motto: NIHIL OBEST
- Fate: Scrapped in Aliaga Turkey 2018

General characteristics
- Class & type: Audace-class destroyer
- Displacement: 4,554 tons full load
- Length: 140.7 m (461 ft 7 in)
- Beam: 14.7 m (48 ft 3 in)
- Draught: 4.5 m (14 ft 9 in)
- Propulsion: 2-shaft geared steam turbines; 4 × Foster Wheeler boilers providing 73,000 hp (54,000 kW)
- Speed: 33 knots (61 km/h; 38 mph)
- Range: 4,000 nmi (7,400 km; 4,600 mi) at 25 kn (46 km/h; 29 mph)
- Complement: 380
- Armament: As built: 2 × Otobreda 127 mm gun; 4 × Oto Melara 76/62 mm Compact gun; 1 × Tartar SAM system; 2 × 324 mm triple torpedo launchers; 2 × 533 mm triple torpedo launchers; Post 1987–1990 modernization: 1 × Otobreda 127 mm gun; 4 × Oto Melara 76/62 mm Super Rapido gun; 1 × Mk.29 octuple launcher for Sea Sparrow/Selenia Aspide SAM; 1 × Mk 13 launcher with 40 Standard SM-1MR missiles; 8 × OTOMAT SSMs; 2 × 324 mm triple torpedo launchers
- Aircraft carried: 2 AB-212ASW helicopters

Ardito (D 550) is the second ship of the Audace-class destroyer of the Italian Navy.

== Development ==
The design of these ships was related to the previous Impavido-class, but they were meant as a decisive improvement over these older vessels. They hull was more capable to resist high sea conditions, incorporating an aft superstructure used to accommodating two AB-212 anti-submarine warfare (ASW) helicopters. This gave the vessels an ASW capability, with improved sonars and torpedo tubes.

The superstructures were built with aluminium alloys in two blocks with one mack (this is the combination with the funnels supporting metallic, short trees used for radar equipment) each. The distance between the two superstructure blocks was high, as both the propulsion systems were located at midships and over this, the 76 mm gun battery. The aft superstructure was dedicated to the Tartar/SM-1 missiles and hangar.

Due to its anti-aircraft, anti-submarine and anti-ship characteristics, the Ardito was the most modern that had been conceived and built up to then in the field of military naval construction. type, entered service in December 1973.

== Construction and career ==
She is laid down on 19 July 1968 and launched on 27 November 1971 by Cantiere Navale di Castellamare di Stabia. Commissioned on 5 December 1972 with the hull number D 550 and decommissioned on 28 September 2006.

After leaving service in 2006, after more than 10 years of mooring at the docks of the La Spezia base, in December 2017 the two ships were sold, by the Agenzia Industrie Difesa (AID), by means of an international public auction. within the Organization for Economic Cooperation and Development (OECD), at Aliaga.

== Gallery ==
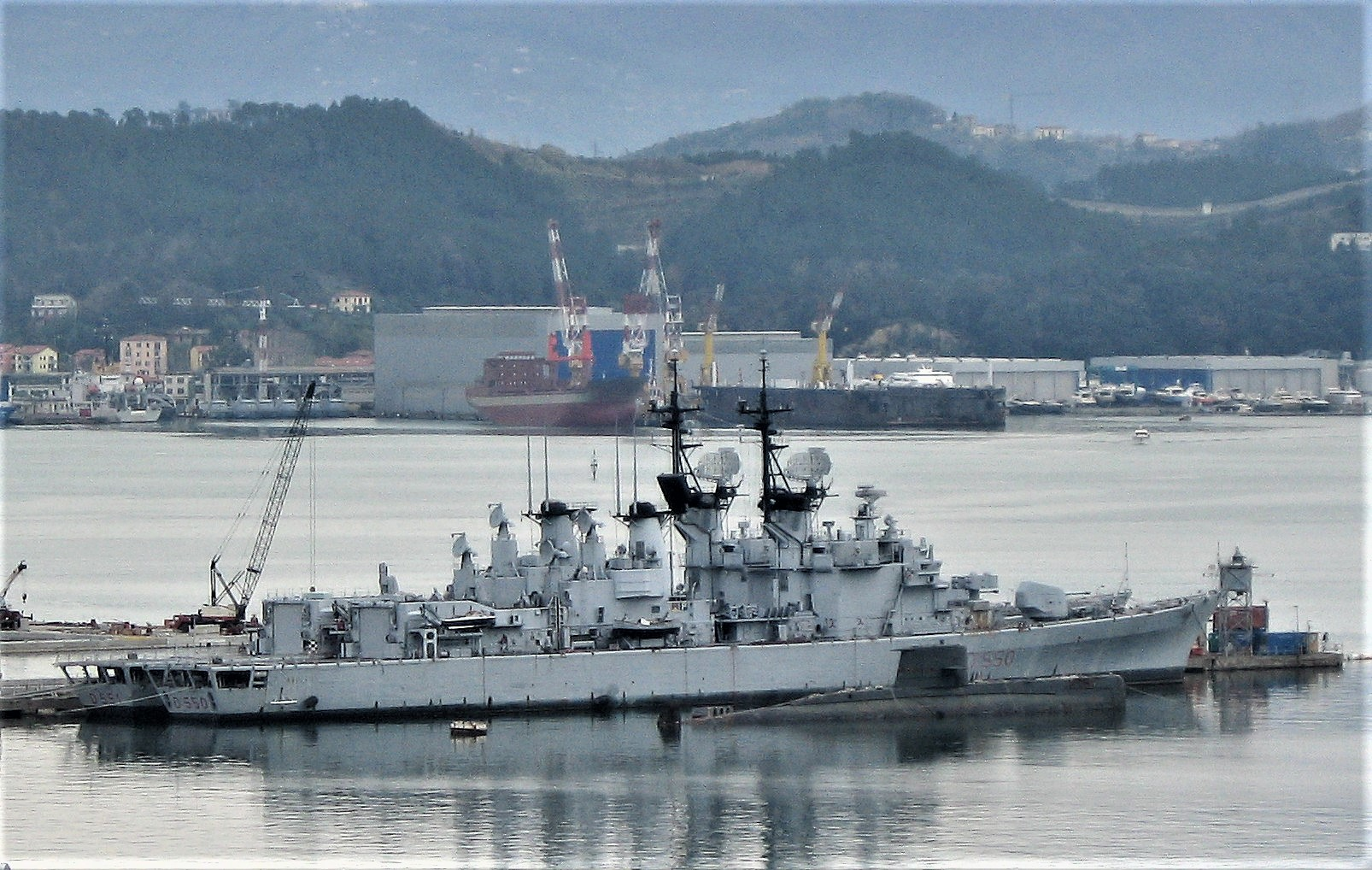
Decommissioned Ardito and Audace in La Spezia on 5 December 2009.

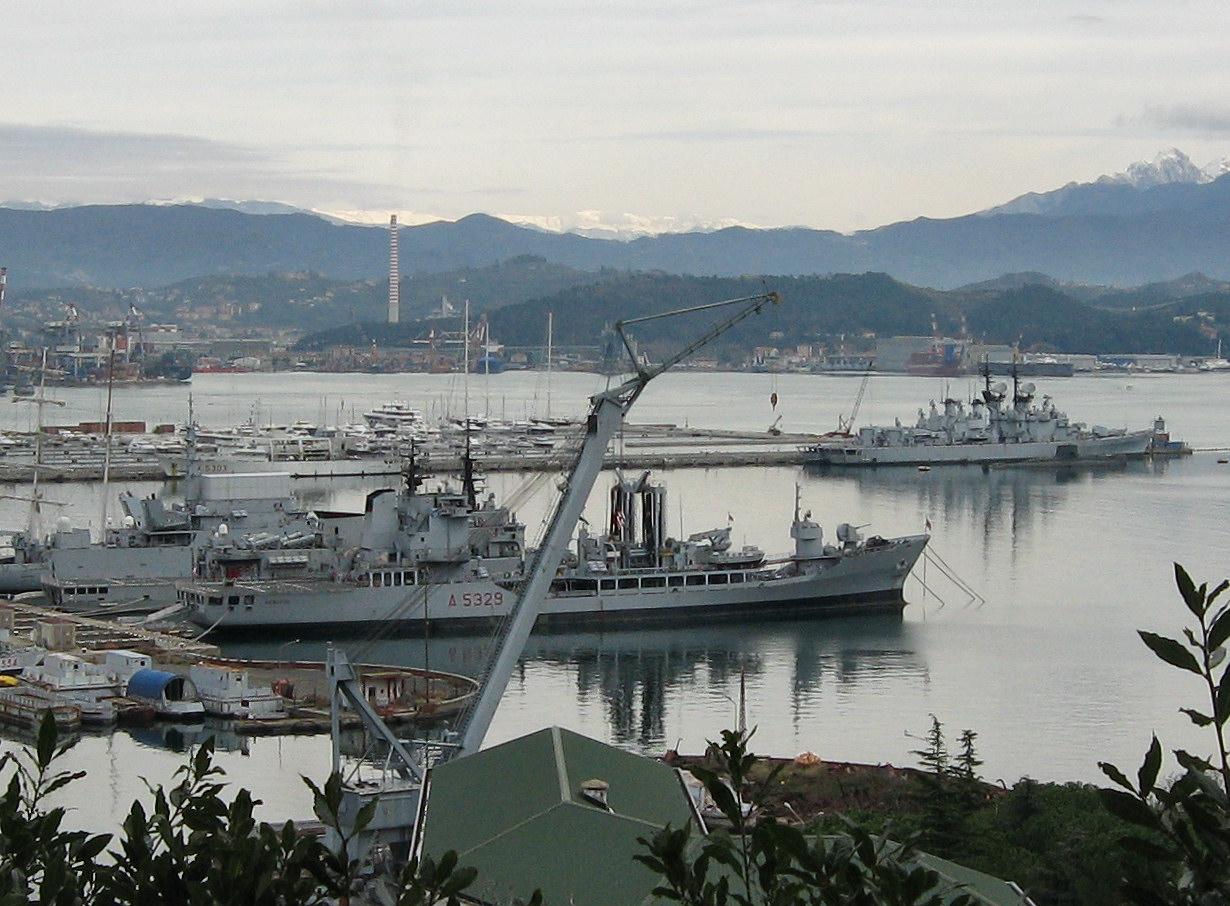
Decommissioned Ardito and Audace in La Spezia on 5 December 2009.
