= Italian ship Impavido =

Impavido was the name of at least three ships of the Italian Navy and may refer to:

- Italian destroyer Impavido (1913), a Indomito-class destroyer launched in 1913 and discarded in 1937.
- Italian torpedo boat Impavido, a Ciclone-class torpedo boat launched in 1943. Seized by Germany and renamed TA23 in September 1943. She was sunk in 1944.
- Italian destroyer Impavido (D 570), a Impavido-class destroyer launched in 1962 and decommissioned in 1992.
