= Italian ship Libra =

Libra has been borne by at least two ships of the Italian Navy and may refer to:

- Italian torpedo boat Libra, a Spica-class torpedo boat launched in 1937 and stricken in 1964.
- Italian patrol vessel Libra (P 402), a Cassiopea-class patrol vessel launched in 1988.
