= Italian destroyer Audace (D 551) =

Audace-class guided missile destroyer

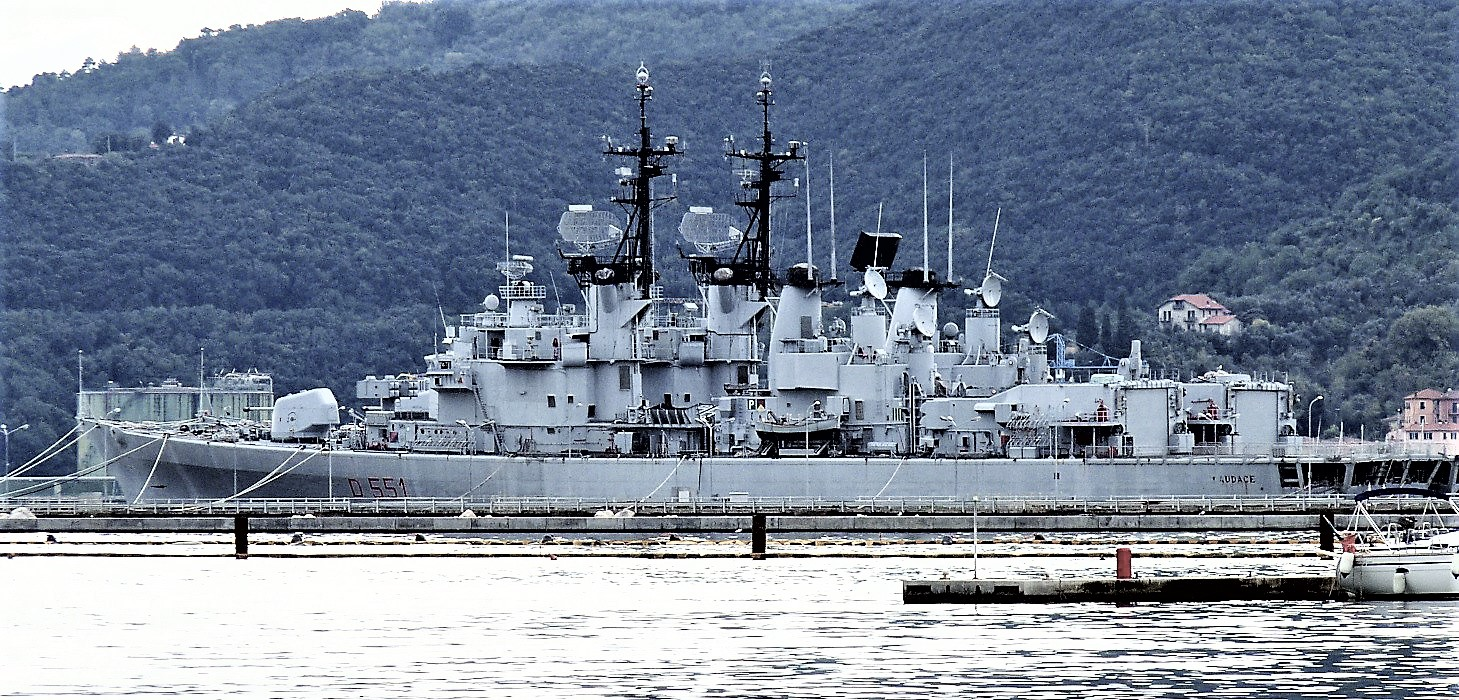
- Audace in La Spezia on 9 November 2008.

History

Italy
- Name: Audace
- Namesake: Audace
- Operator: Italian Navy
- Builder: Cantiere navale di Riva Trigoso shipyards
- Laid down: 17 April 1968
- Launched: 2 October 1971
- Commissioned: 16 November 1972
- Decommissioned: 28 September 2006
- Identification: Pennant number: D 551
- Fate: Scrapped in Aliaga Turkey 2018

General characteristics
- Class & type: Audace-class destroyer
- Displacement: 4,554 tons full load
- Length: 140.7 m (461 ft 7 in)
- Beam: 14.7 m (48 ft 3 in)
- Draught: 4.5 m (14 ft 9 in)
- Installed power: 4 × Foster Wheeler boilers; 73,000 hp (54,000 kW)
- Propulsion: 2-shaft geared steam turbines
- Speed: 33 knots (61 km/h; 38 mph)
- Range: 4,000 nmi (7,400 km; 4,600 mi) at 25 kn (46 km/h; 29 mph)
- Complement: 380
- Armament: As built: 2 × Otobreda 127 mm gun; 4 × Oto Melara 76/62 mm Compact gun; 1 × Tartar SAM system; 2 × 324 mm triple torpedo launchers; 2 × 533 mm triple torpedo launchers; Post 1987–1990 modernization: 1 × Otobreda 127 mm gun; 4 × Oto Melara 76/62 mm Super Rapido gun; 1 × Mk.29 octuple launcher for Sea Sparrow/Selenia Aspide SAM; 1 × Mk 13 launcher with 40 Standard SM-1MR missiles; 8 × OTOMAT SSMs; 2 × 324 mm triple torpedo launchers
- Aircraft carried: 2 AB-212ASW helicopters

Audace (D 551) was the lead ship of the Audace-class destroyer of the Italian Navy.

== Development ==
The design of these ships was related to the previous Impavido-class, but they were meant as a decisive improvement over these older vessels. They hull was more capable to resist high sea conditions, incorporating an aft superstructure used to accommodating two AB-212 anti-submarine warfare (ASW) helicopters. This gave the vessels an ASW capability, with improved sonars and torpedo tubes.

The superstructures were built with aluminium alloys in two blocks with one mack (this is the combination with the funnels supporting metallic, short trees used for radar equipment) each. The distance between the two superstructure blocks was high, as both the propulsion systems were located at midships and over this, the 76 mm gun battery. The aft superstructure was dedicated to the Tartar/SM-1 missiles and hangar.

Due to its anti-aircraft, anti-submarine and anti-ship characteristics, the Ardito was the most modern that had been conceived and built up to then in the field of military naval construction. type, entered service in December 1973.

== Construction and career ==
She was laid down on 17 April 1968 and launched on 2 October 1971 by Cantiere navale di Riva Trigoso. Commissioned on 16 November 1972 with the hull number D 551 and decommissioned on 28 September 2006.

Audace was the pride of the Navy in the 1970s, serving for 35 years until 2006. She was sent to Aliaga to be scrapped on 7 May 2018.

== Gallery ==
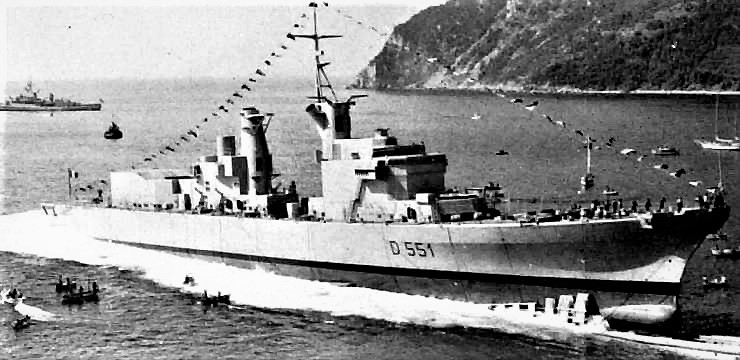
Audace being launched on 2 October 1971.

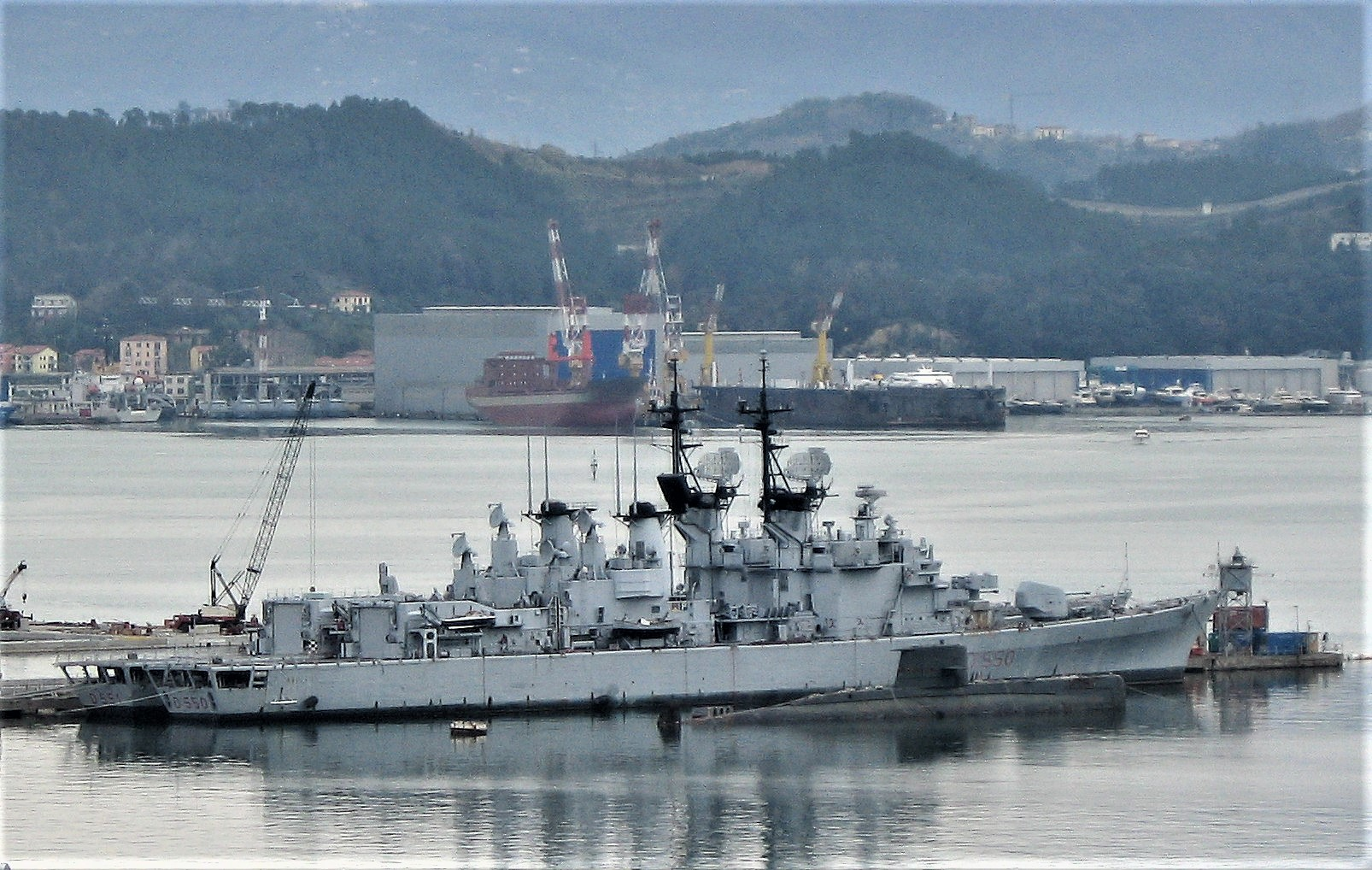
Decommissioned Ardito and Audace in La Spezia on 5 December 2009.

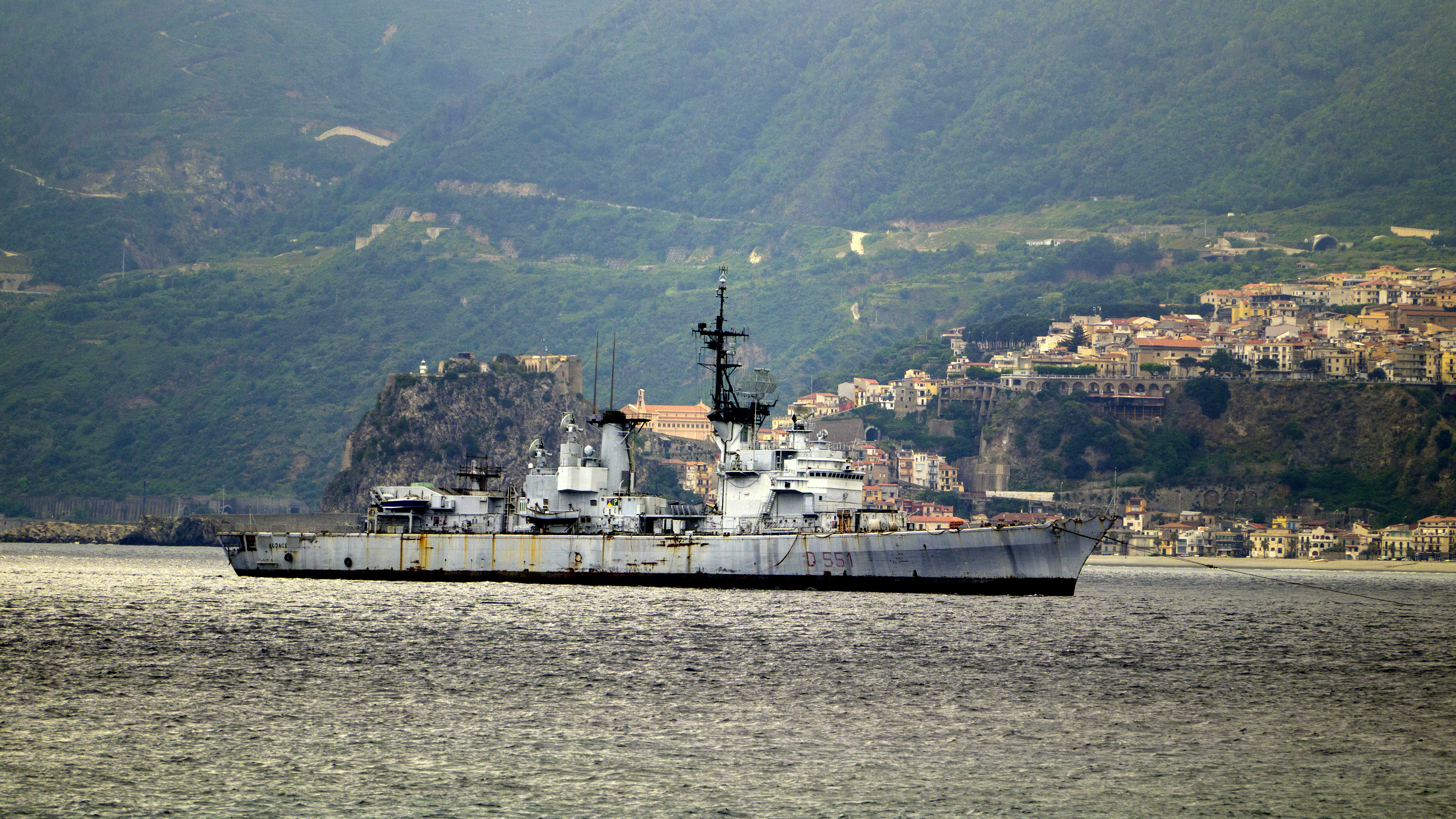
Decommissioned Audace transiting the Messina Strait by tug to Aliaga to be demolished and scrapped on 8 May 2018

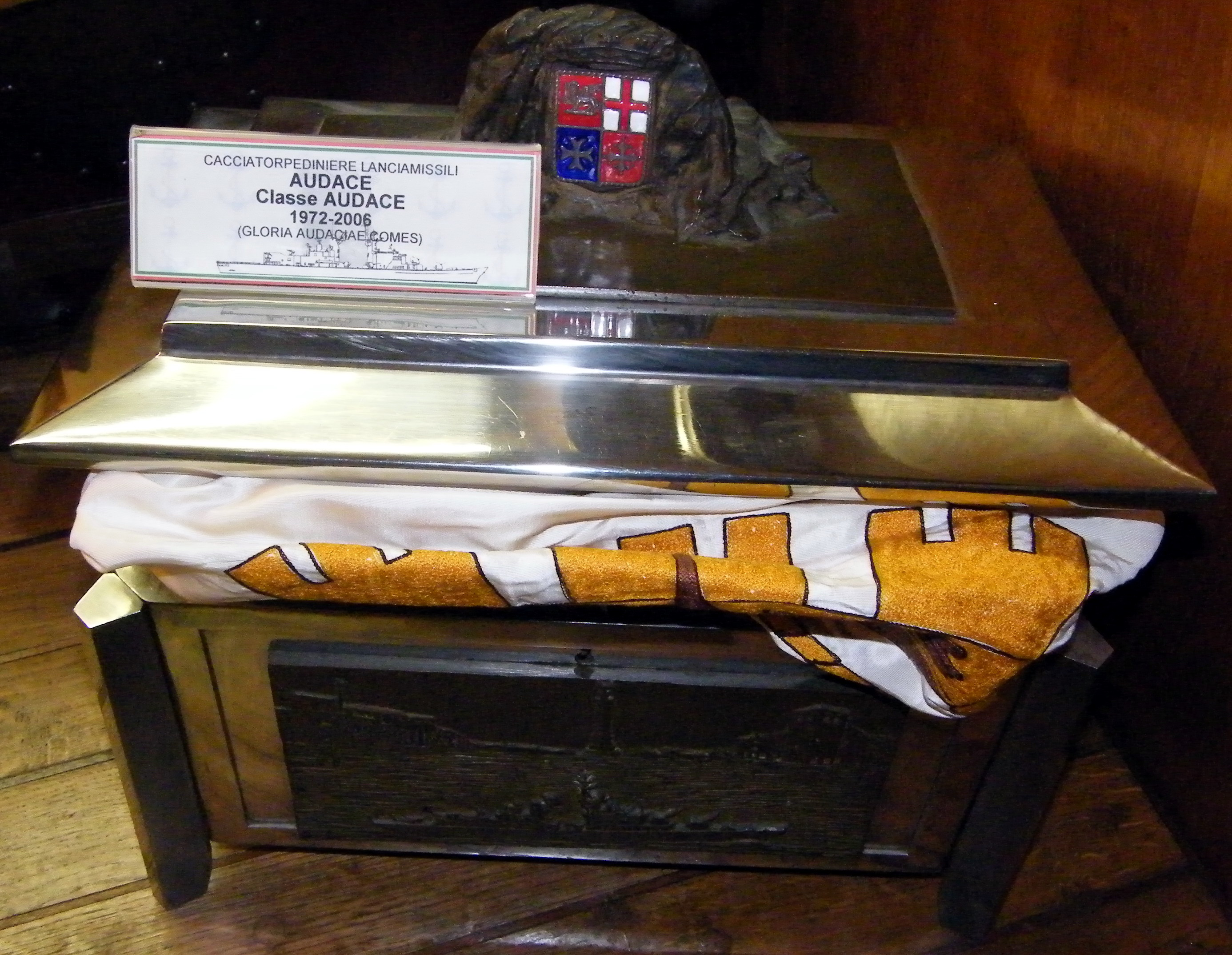
Audace's flag on display on 21 November 2008.
