= Audace-class destroyer =

There have been two classes of destroyers built for the Italian navies named Audace:

- Audace-class destroyer, two ships, both launched in 1913
- Audace-class destroyer, two ships, both launched in 1971

== See also ==
- Italian destroyer Audace (1916), a third destroyer of the same name built to a unique design
