= Italian destroyer Intrepido (D 571) =

Impavido-class guided missile destroyer

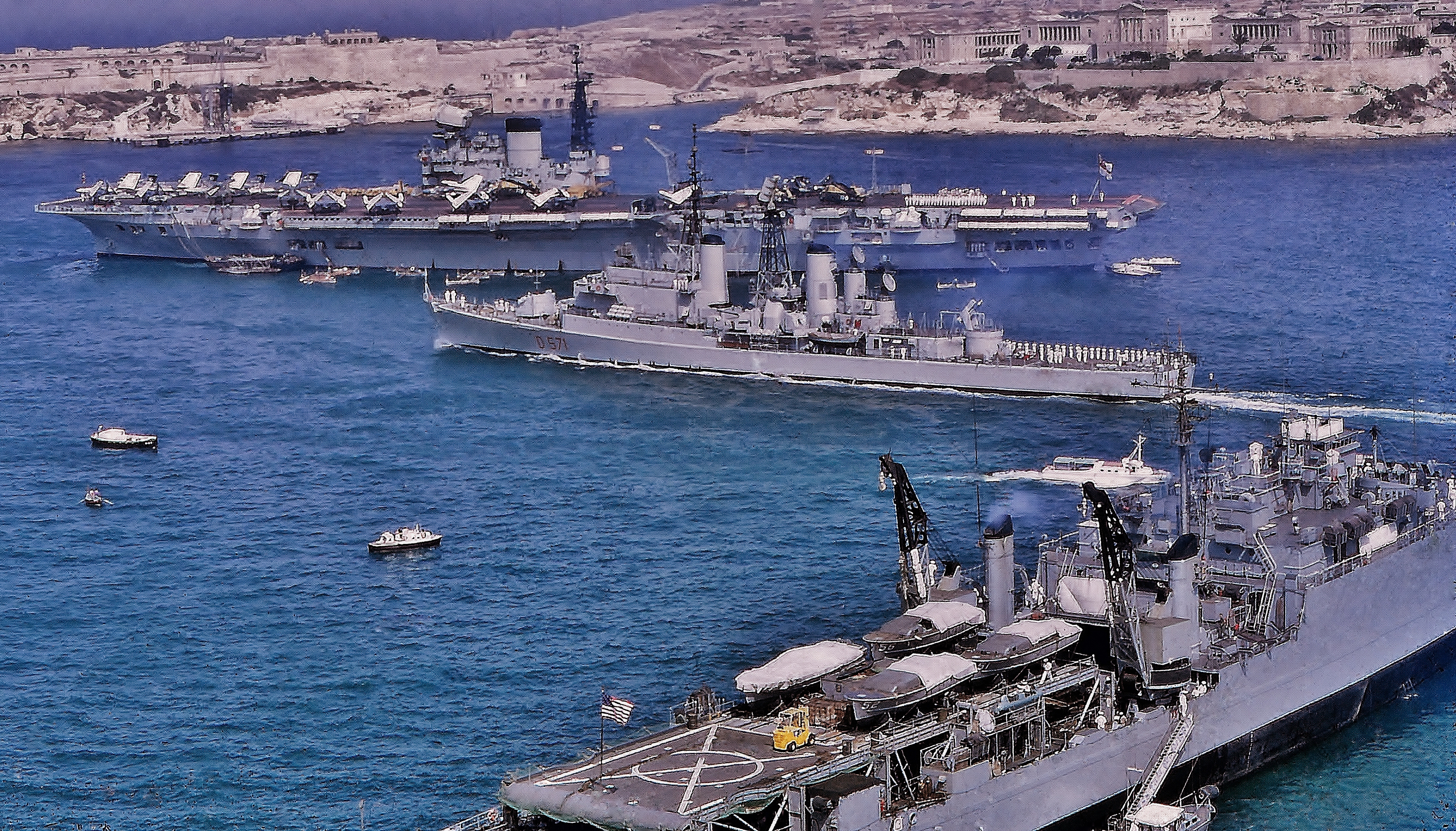
- HMS Victorious and Intrepido leaving Malta in July 1967.

History

Italy
- Name: Intrepido
- Namesake: Intrepido
- Operator: Italian Navy
- Builder: Ansaldo Stabilimento Luigi Orlando, Livorno
- Laid down: 16 May 1959
- Launched: 21 October 1962
- Commissioned: 28 July 1964
- Decommissioned: August 1991
- Identification: Pennant number: D 571
- Fate: Scrapped

General characteristics Data from
- Class & type: Impavido-class destroyer
- Displacement: 3,201 ton standard; 3,941 tons full load
- Length: 130.9 m (429 ft 6 in)
- Beam: 13.6 m (44 ft 7 in)
- Draught: 4.5 m (14 ft 9 in)
- Propulsion: 2 shaft geared turbines; 4 Foster Wheeler boilers, 70,000 hp (52,000 kW)
- Speed: 34 kn (63 km/h; 39 mph)
- Range: 3,300 nmi (6,100 km; 3,800 mi) at 20 kn (37 km/h; 23 mph)
- Complement: 344 (15 officers, 319 enlisted)
- Sensors & processing systems: AN/SPS-12 Air search radar; AN/SPS-39 3D radar; AN/SPG-51 Tartar fire control; AN/SQS-23 sonar
- Armament: 1× Tartar SAM system; 2× 127 mm (5 in)/38 gun; 4× OTO Melara 76 mm (3 in)/L62 MMI; 2× 533 mm (21 in) triple torpedo launchers
- Aircraft carried: 1 helicopter

Intrepido (D 571) is the second ship of the Impavido-class destroyer of the Italian Navy.

== Development ==
The Impavido-class were the first guided missile destroyers of the Italian Navy. The vessels were commissioned in the early 1960s and were roughly equal to the American Charles F. Adams-class destroyer. Both classes shared the Tartar missile system, with a Mk 13 launcher, and carried around 40 missiles. They had two fire control radars to guide their weaponry and all were fitted in the aft of the ship. Both classes also had two single 127 mm (5 in) guns, but the American ships had these in single mountings and a new model, the Mk 42, one fore and the other aft, while the Impavido-class made use of an older Mk 38 dual turret.

== Construction and career ==
She is laid down on 16 May 1959 and launched on 21 October 1962 by Cantiere navale fratelli Orlando. Commissioned on 28 July 1964 with the hull number D 571 and decommissioned in August 1991.

== Gallery ==
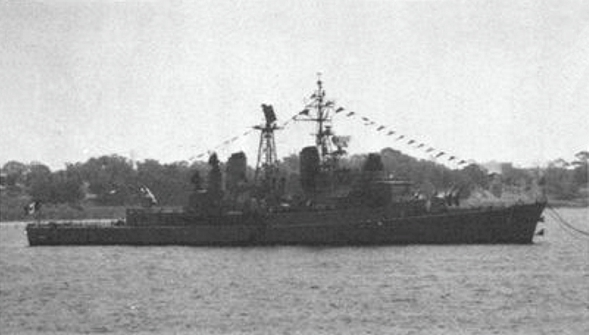
Intrepido anchored in 1971.
