= Italian destroyer Impavido (D 570) =

Impavido-class guided missile destroyer

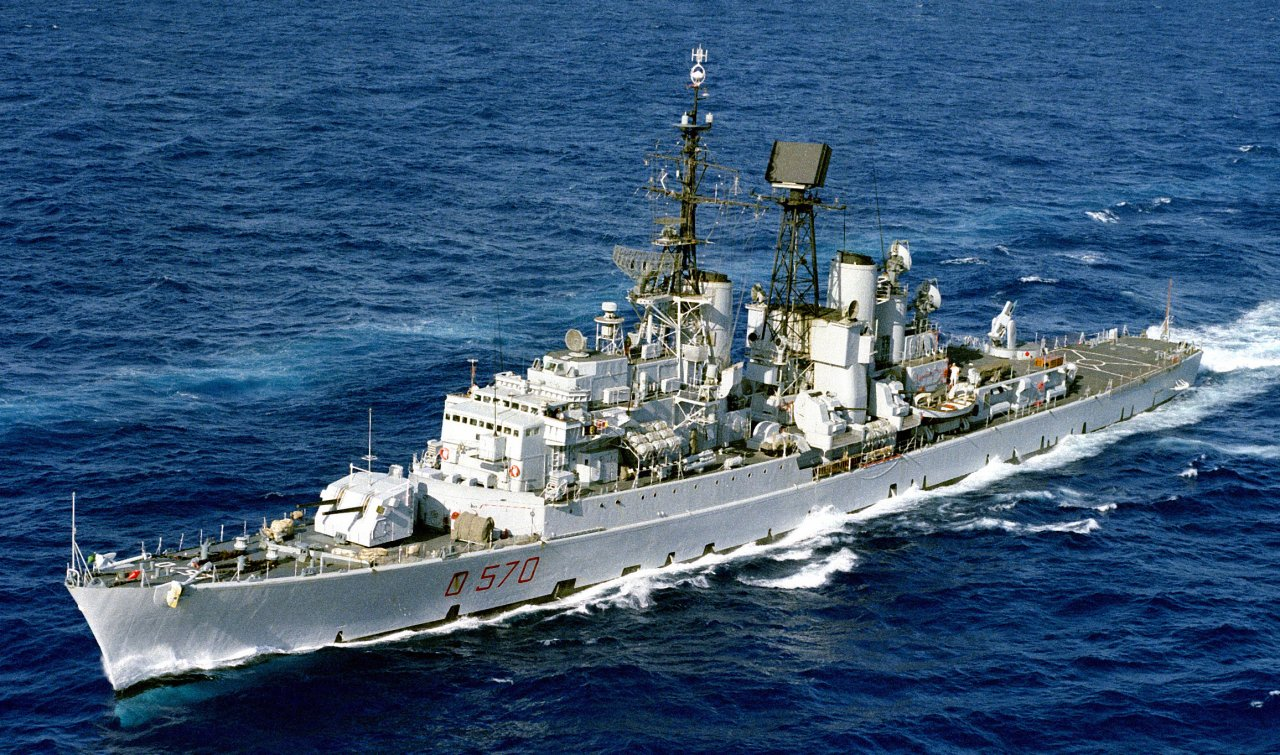
- Impavido underway in the Mediterranean Sea on 19 May 1983.

History

Italy
- Name: Impavido
- Namesake: Impavido
- Operator: Italian Navy
- Builder: Cantiere navale di Riva Trigoso
- Laid down: 10 June 1957
- Launched: 25 May 1962
- Commissioned: 16 November 1963
- Decommissioned: June 1992
- Identification: Pennant number: D 570
- Fate: Scrapped

General characteristics Data from
- Class & type: Impavido-class destroyer
- Displacement: 3,201 ton standard; 3,941 tons full load
- Length: 130.9 m (429 ft 6 in)
- Beam: 13.6 m (44 ft 7 in)
- Draught: 4.5 m (14 ft 9 in)
- Propulsion: 2 shaft geared turbines; 4 Foster Wheeler boilers, 70,000 hp (52,000 kW)
- Speed: 34 kn (63 km/h; 39 mph)
- Range: 3,300 nmi (6,100 km; 3,800 mi) at 20 kn (37 km/h; 23 mph)
- Complement: 344 (15 officers, 319 enlisted)
- Sensors & processing systems: AN/SPS-12 Air search radar; AN/SPS-39 3D radar; AN/SPG-51 Tartar fire control; AN/SQS-23 sonar
- Armament: 1× Tartar SAM system; 2× 127 mm (5 in)/38 gun; 4× OTO Melara 76 mm (3 in)/L62 MMI; 2× 533 mm (21 in) triple torpedo launchers
- Aircraft carried: 1 Helicopter

Impavido (D 570) is the lead ship of the Impavido-class destroyer of the Italian Navy.

== Development ==
The Impavido-class were the first guided missile destroyers of the Italian Navy. The vessels were commissioned in the early 1960s and were roughly equal to the American Charles F. Adams-class destroyer. Both classes shared the Tartar missile system, with a Mk 13 launcher, and carried around 40 missiles. They had two fire control radars to guide their weaponry and all this was fitted in the aft of the ship. Both classes also had two single 127 mm (5 in) guns, but the American ships had these in single mountings and in a new model, the Mk 42, one fore and the other aft, while the Impavido-class made use of an older Mk 38 dual turret.

== Construction and career ==
She is laid down on 10 June 1957 and launched on 25 May 1962 by Cantiere navale di Riva Trigoso. Commissioned on 16 November 1963 with the hull number D 570 and decommissioned in June 1992.

== Gallery ==
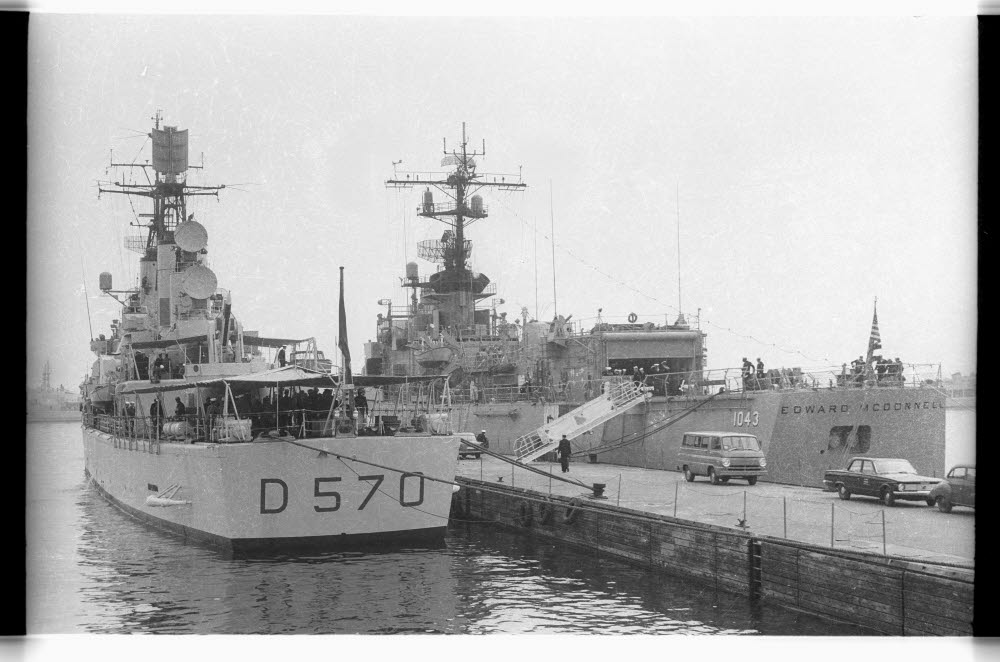
Impavido and USS Edward McDonnell moored in Kiel, Germany in June 1966.
