= Italian destroyer Audace (1913) =

Italian Audace-class destroyer (1913)

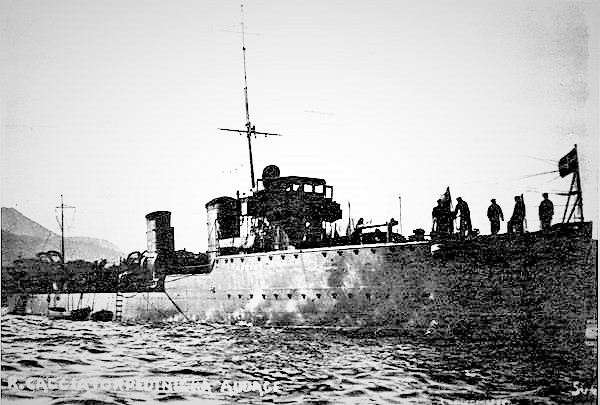
- Audace

History

Kingdom of Italy
- Name: Audace
- Namesake: Bold
- Builder: Cantiere navale fratelli Orlando, Livorno, Kingdom of Italy
- Laid down: April 1912
- Launched: 4 May 1913
- Commissioned: March 1914
- Fate: Sunk in collision 30 August 1916

General characteristics
- Class & type: Audace-class destroyer
- Displacement: Full load: 840 long tons (850 t)
- Length: 75.5 m (247 ft 8 in) loa
- Beam: 7.5 m (24 ft 7 in)
- Draft: 2.6 m (8 ft 6 in)
- Installed power: 4 × water-tube boilers; 16,000 shp (11,931 kW)
- Propulsion: 2 × steam turbines; 2 × screw propellers
- Speed: 30 knots (56 km/h; 35 mph)
- Range: 950 nmi (1,760 km; 1,090 mi) at 14 knots (26 km/h; 16 mph)
- Complement: 4–5 officers; 65–74 enlisted men
- Armament: 1 × 120 mm (4.7 in) gun; 4 × 76 mm (3 in) guns; 2 × 450 mm (17.7 in) torpedo tubes

Audace was the lead ship of the Audace-class destroyers of the Italian Regia Marina ("Royal Navy"). Commissioned in 1914, she served during World War I, participating in the Adriatic campaign and operating as a convoy escort until she sank after a collision in 1916.

== Design ==
The ships of the Audace class were 74.8 m (245 ft 5 in) long at the waterline and 75.5 m (247 ft 8 in) long overall, with a beam of 7.5 m (24 ft 7 in) and a draft of 2.6 m (8 ft 6 in). They displaced 740 long tons (750 t) standard and up to 840 long tons (850 t) at full load. They had a crew of four to five officers and 65 to 74 enlisted men. The ships were powered by two Zoelly steam turbines, with steam provided by four White-Forster water-tube boilers. The engines were rated to produce 16,000 shaft horsepower (11,931 kW) for a top speed of 30 knots (56 km/h; 35 mph), though in service they reached as high as 36.1 knots (66.9 km/h; 41.5 mph) with 15,000 shp (11,185 kW). At a more economical speed of 14 knots (26 km/h; 16 mph), the ships could cruise for 950 nautical miles (1,760 km; 1,090 mi).

The ship carried an armament that consisted of a single 120 mm (4.7 in) gun and four 76 mm (3 in) guns, along with two 450 mm (17.7 in) torpedo tubes. The 120 mm gun was placed on the forecastle and two of the 76 mm guns were mounted abreast of the funnels, with the remaining pair at the stern. The torpedo tubes were in single mounts, both on the centerline.

The design of the Audace-class ships was based on that of the preceding Indomito class. During operations, the Audace class revealed somewhat disappointing characteristics.

== Construction and commissioning ==
Audace was laid down at the Cantiere navale fratelli Orlando ("Orlandi Brothers Shipyard") in Leghorn (Livorno) in May 1912 and was launched on 4 May 1913. She was commissioned in March 1914.

== Service history ==
=== 1915–1916 ===
World War I broke out in 1914, and the Kingdom of Italy entered the war on the side of the Allies with its declaration of war on Austria-Hungary on 23 May 1915. At the time, Audace, under the command of Capitano di corvetta (Corvette Captain) Cantu, and the destroyers Animoso, Ardente, Ardito, and Francesco Nullo made up the 1st Destroyer Squadron, based at Brindisi, with the squadron under the command of Capitano di corvetta (Corvette Captain) Caccia. On 24 May Audace, Animoso, and Ardito carried out an anti-submarine patrol in the Gulf of Drin off the coast of the Principality of Albania and subsequently off Cattaro, a major base of the Austro-Hungarian Navy. On 9 June 1915, Audace, Animoso, Ardente, Ardito, the destroyers Indomito, Intrepido, Impetuoso, Irrequieto, and Insidioso, and the protected cruiser Quarto escorted the armored cruisers Giuseppe Garibaldi and Vettor Pisani as they bombarded the lighthouses at the Cape of Rodon and Shëngjin (known to the Italians as San Giovanni di Medua) on the coast of Albania.

On 11 July 1915 Audace, Ardito, Animoso, and Ardente escorted Quarto to the Palagruža (known to the Italians as the Pelagosa) archipelago in the Adriatic Sea, where they landed the vanguard of an occupation force. The auxiliary cruiser Città di Palermo, the protected cruiser Marsala, the destroyer Strale, and the torpedo boats Airone, Arpia, Astore, Calliope, Cassiopea, and Clio also took part in the operation, which went smoothly: Two Austro-Hungarian signalmen, who first hid from and then surrendered to the Italians, made up the archipelago's entire garrison.

On 13 June 1916 Audace, under the command of Capitano di fregata (Frigate Captain) Piazza, and the destroyers Antonio Mosto, Pilade Bronzetti, and Rosolino Pilo provided escort and support to the motor torpedo boats MAS 5 and MAS 7, which, after the coastal torpedo boats 35 PN and 37 PN towed them to a starting position, penetrated the harbor at Austro-Hungarian-occupied Shëngjin. The incursion was unsuccessful: MAS 5 and MAS 7 found no ships moored in the harbor. MAS 5 and MAS 7 withdrew under Austro-Hungarian artillery fire without suffering any damage.

On the night of 25–26 June 1916, while Audace, Insidioso, Marsala, and the destroyers Impavido and Irrequieto operated in distant support, Antonio Mosto, Pilade Bronzetti, Rosolino Pilo, and the destroyer Giuseppe Cesare Abba escorted the coastal torpedo boats 34 PN and 36 PN as 34 PN and 36 PN towed MAS 5 and MAS 7 to a point 2.5 nautical miles (4.6 km; 2.9 mi) off Durrës (known to the Italians as Durazzo) in Albania. MAS 5 and MAS 7 then dropped their tow cables and raided the harbor at Durrës. The attack resulted in serious damage to the 1,111-gross register ton steamship Sarajevo.

=== Loss ===
On the night of 29–30 August 1916 Audace was escorting the steamer Brasile from Taranto, Italy, to Thessaloniki, Greece, when she collided with Brasile. She sank in the Ionian Sea off Capo Colonna, Italy, in the predawn hours of 30 August 1916.

== Wreck ==
Audace′s wreck was found in 2007 at a depth of between 110 and 120 meters (361 and 394 ft). It was largely intact, with its bow oriented toward the south.

== Bibliography ==
=== References ===
- Favre, Franco. La Marina nella Grande Guerra. Le operazioni navali, aeree, subacquee e terrestri in Adriatico (in Italian).
- Fraccaroli, Aldo (1985). "Italy". In Gardiner, Robert & Gray, Randal (eds.). Conway's All the World's Fighting Ships 1906–1921. Annapolis: Naval Institute Press. pp. 252–290. ISBN 978-0-85177-245-5.
- Ruberti, Testo. "Intrepido Fino In Fondo" (PDF). Storie di Guerra e de Relitti (in Italian).
- Willmott, H. P. (2009). The Last Century of Sea Power (Volume 1, From Port Arthur to Chanak, 1894–1922). Bloomington: Indiana University Press. ISBN 978-0-253-35214-9.
