= Aliağa, Tarsus =

Aliağa
- Neighbourhood
- Location within Turkey
- Coordinates: 36°50′N 34°56′E
- Country: Turkey
- Province: Mersin
- District: Tarsus
- Elevation: 5 m (16 ft)
- Population (2022): 439
- Time zone: UTC+3 (TRT)
- Area code: 0324

Aliağa is a neighbourhood in the municipality and district of Tarsus, Mersin Province, Turkey. Its population is 439 (2022). It is situated in Çukurova (Cilicia of the antiquity) plains to the east of Karabucak Forest. The distance to Tarsus is 12 kilometres (7.5 mi) and the distance to Mersin is 37 kilometres (23 mi).
