= 76mm/L62 Allargato =

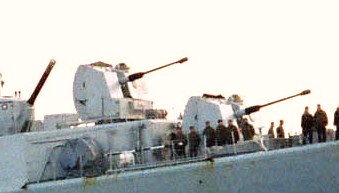
- 76/62mm MMI/Allargato gun mounts on the Italian frigate Carabiniere
- Type: Naval gun
- Place of origin: Italy

Service history
- In service: 1962–present
- Used by: Italian Navy; Albanian Navy
- Wars: Cold War

Production history
- Designer: Oto Melara
- Designed: 1958
- Manufacturer: OTO Melara
- Produced: 1962 - 1967/69
- No. built: 84
- Variants: Otobreda 76 mm

Specifications
- Mass: 12 tonnes (26,000 lb)
- Barrel length: 62 caliber: 4,724.4 mm (186.00 in)
- Crew: 1
- Shell: Complete round: 76×636mmR
- Caliber: 76.2 mm (3.00 in)
- Barrels: 1
- Action: automatic
- Elevation: -15°/+85° speed: 40°/sec
- Traverse: 360° speed: 70°/sec
- Rate of fire: 55/60 rpm
- Muzzle velocity: 900 m/s (3,000 ft/s)
- Maximum firing range: HE round fired at 45°: 16,000 m (17,000 yd)
- Feed system: Magazine

The 76mm/L62 Allargato is a single barrel, medium caliber, dual purpose automatic naval cannon designed and produced in the 1960s by the Italian defence firm of OTO-Melara as the cannon armament for all medium and large warships built for the Italian Navy in that decade. Currently, the gun remains in service with Italy's Cassiopea-class patrol vessels but has otherwise been largely replaced by the Otobreda 76 mm series of cannons.

== History ==
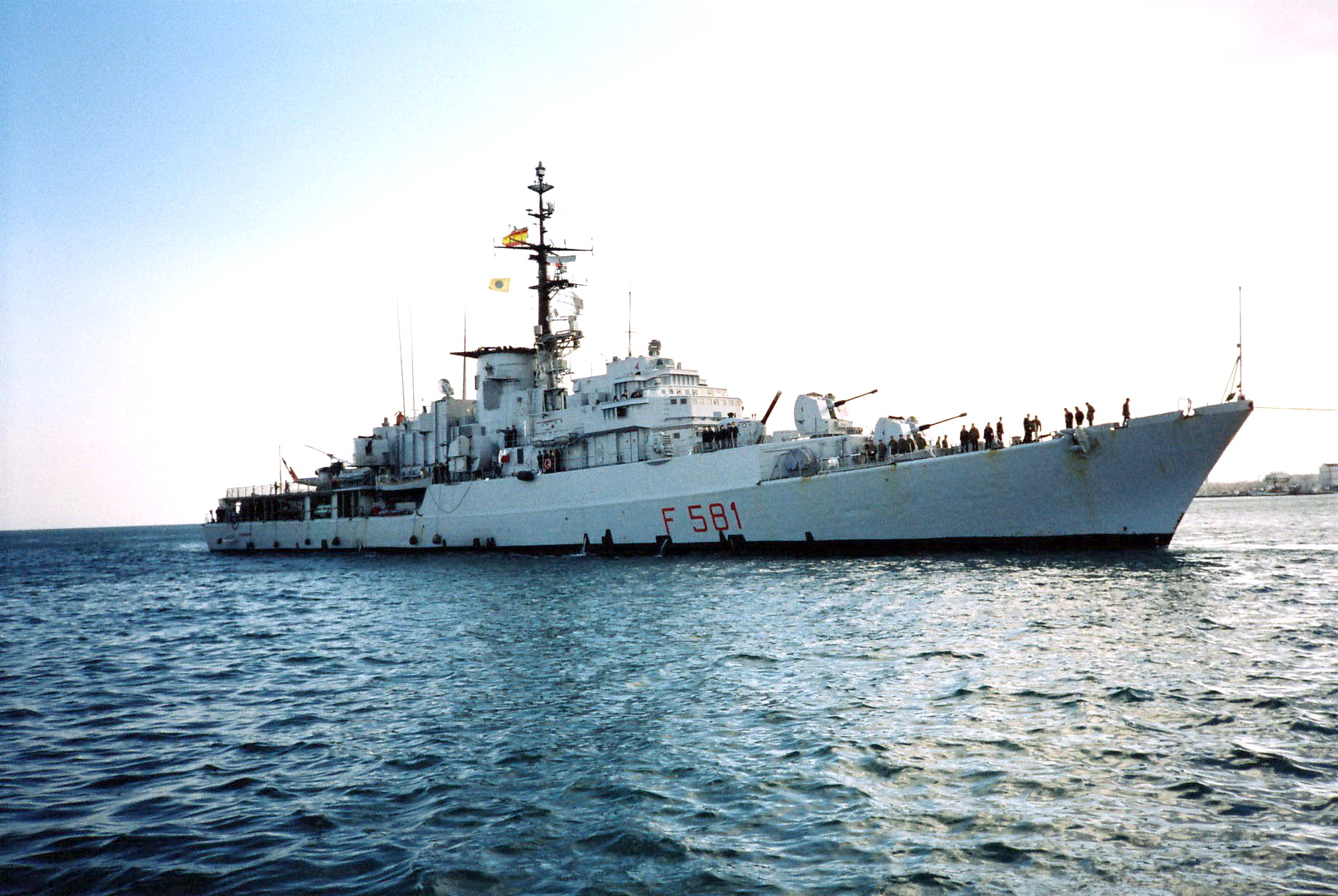
The Italian Alpino-class frigate Carabiniere spotting two 76mm/L62 Allargato turrets mounted forward and two amidships

After World War Two, when Italy joined NATO, it received a large part of its weapons from the United States in the form of direct military assistance. This included the transfer of surplus United States Navy (USN) warships from that war also. In the mid-1950s the Italian Navy began planning and funding a program of modernization, in which many of those outdated World War Two warships would be replaced with newer and more modern warships built in Italy. In addition the armament would be updated. At that time Italian warships were equipped for the most part with US-built naval cannons, with the USN 5-inch (127 mm) gun and the Bofors 40 mm/L60 being the most numerous. In the opinion of the Italian Navy in the 1950s, the 5-inch was seen as too heavy for many warships while the 40mm/L60 was deemed too light for use as the main weapon on its smaller corvettes that were being planned under the modernization plan.

As a result, the Italian Navy contracted the Italian firm of OTO-Melara to design and manufacture a medium caliber naval cannon with both an anti-surface and anti-aircraft ability. Stemming from Italian Navy's studies and experiences using the USN 3-inch (76.2 mm) gun, it was decided to be the best compromise for a dual purpose cannon. The design of this new cannon contracted by OTO-Melara would be the primary armament on smaller warships, like corvettes, and the secondary armament on larger class warship, e.g. frigates, destroyers and primary cannon armament of the new helicopter cruisers planned.

The first type developed was a twin barrel mount, the 76mm/L62 SMP3 Sovrapposto which had the unusual arrangement of having two barrels one above the other instead of side by side as with most naval cannon turrets. There were high hopes for the Sovrapposto turret but in service use on the Centauro class and other warships, its performance proved to be unsatisfactory, and in 1958 OTO Melara began work on a single-barrel version.

Development began in 1958, with the first cannon delivered in 1961 for testing and production soon followed. In 1962 the first 76/62 MMI Allargato was delivered to the Italian Navy for mounting on the Carlo Bergamini-class frigates. In the five following years, OTO-Melara produced a total of 84 exclusively for the Italian Navy. All Italian warships that had the twin Sovrapposto turret, that were to remain in service had them replaced with the single barrel Allargato turret. And while OTO-Melara attempted to marketed their new naval cannon for export, there were no orders.

As of 2011, the gun remained in use only on board the Cassiopea-class patrol vessels.

== Description ==
The Allargato has a single barrel which is water-sprayed cooled. The cannon and its loading tray is covered in a water tight turret cover that is also protection against small shell splinters. Also in the turret there is a station for one man who is needed to direct the cannon from data provided by the ships fire control system. All other actions when the cannon is fired are automatic.

The cannon is slewed by hydraulic-electrical system, with a manual backup. Ammunition is stored in a magazine below the turret from which rounds are fed to the loading tray and then rammed in the breech and fired. Spent shell casing are automatically ejected outside the turret after being fired. Total weight of the turret and magazine is 12 tons. The rate of fire can be adjusted between 10 and 60 rounds per minute.

== Replacement ==
In the late 1960s, the Allargato was replaced in production by the highly successful OTO-Melara 76mm Compact. Due to its higher weight the Allargato is now considered outdated and has largely been withdrawn from most active service vessels, being replaced by either the 76mm/L62 Compact or the Breda 40mm/L70 Compact.

== Ships mounted on ==
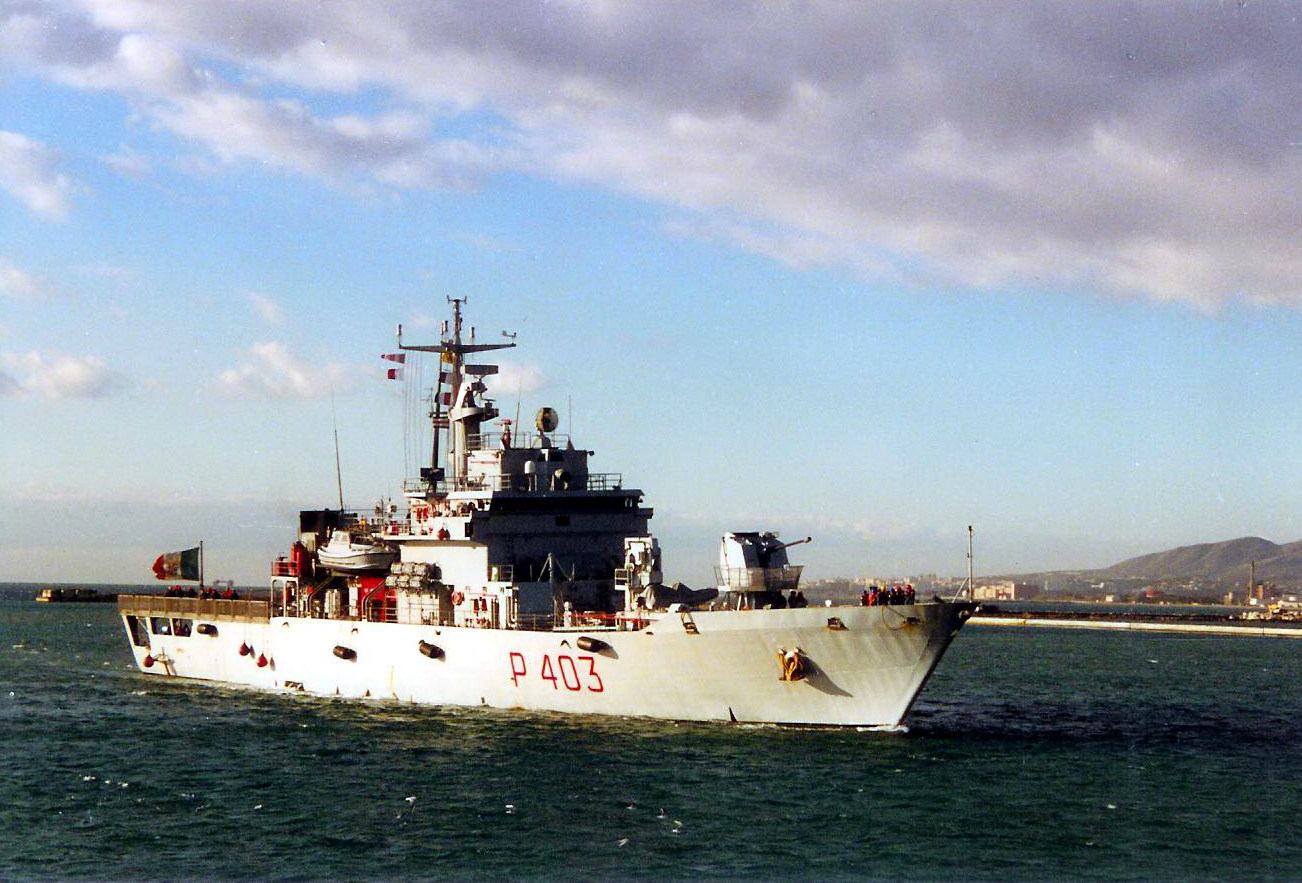
Spica, a Cassiopea-class patrol vessel with a single 76mm/L62 MMI mounted upfront

Albanian Navy

- Cassiopea-class patrol vessels

Italian Navy

- Active duty:
  - Cassiopea-class patrol vessels
- Decommissioned:
  - Italian cruiser Giuseppe Garibaldi
  - Andrea Doria-class cruisers
  - Italian cruiser Vittorio Veneto
  - Impavido-class destroyers
  - Alpino-class frigates
  - Bergamini-class frigates
  - Centauro-class frigates
  - Pietro De Cristofaro-class corvette
  - Albatros-class corvettes (originally equipped with the 76mm/L62 SMP3 Sovrapposto)
