= Audace-class destroyer (1913) =

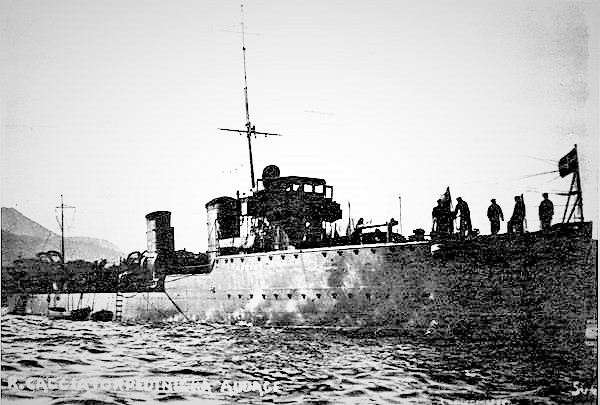
- Audace

Class overview
- Operators: Kingdom of Italy
- Preceded by: Ardito class
- Succeeded by: Rosolino Pilo class
- Completed: 2
- Lost: 1
- Scrapped: 1

General characteristics
- Type: Destroyer
- Displacement: Full load: 840 long tons (850 t)
- Length: 75.5 m (247 ft 8 in) loa
- Beam: 7.5 m (24 ft 7 in)
- Draft: 2.6 m (8 ft 6 in)
- Installed power: 4 × water-tube boilers; 16,000 shp (12,000 kW)
- Propulsion: 2 × steam turbines; 2 × screw propellers
- Speed: 30 knots (56 km/h; 35 mph)
- Range: 950 nmi (1,760 km; 1,090 mi) at 14 knots (26 km/h; 16 mph)
- Complement: 4–5 officers; 65–74 enlisted men
- Armament: 1 × 120 mm (4.7 in) gun; 4 × 76 mm (3 in) guns; 2 × 450 mm (17.7 in) torpedo tubes

The Audace class of destroyers consisted of two ships—Audace and Animoso—that were built for the Italian Regia Marina (Royal Navy) in the 1910s.

== Design ==
The design for the Audace class was based on that of the earlier Indomito class, which had been designed by the firm Society Pattison of Naples. The Cantiere navale fratelli Orlando shipyard modified the design to accept Swiss steam turbines, but the ships were broadly similar, carrying the same armament and having a similar top speed.

The ships of the Audace class were 74.8 m (245 ft 5 in) long at the waterline and 75.5 m (247 ft 8 in) long overall, with a beam of 7.5 m (24 ft 7 in) and a draft of 2.6 m (8 ft 6 in). They displaced 740 long tons (750 t) standard and up to 840 long tons (850 t) at full load. They had a crew of 4 to 5 officers and 65 to 74 enlisted men. The ships had a small superstructure that consisted primarily of a conning tower forward. A raised forecastle deck terminated at the conning tower and stepped down to the main deck level for the rest of the length of the hull.

The ships were powered by two Zoelly steam turbines, with steam provided by four White-Forster water-tube boilers. The engines were rated to produce 16,000 shaft horsepower (12,000 kW) for a top speed of 30 knots (56 km/h; 35 mph), though in service they reached as high as 36.1 knots (66.9 km/h; 41.5 mph) from 15,000 shp (11,000 kW). At 27 knots (50 km/h; 31 mph), the ships could cruise for 300 nautical miles (560 km; 350 mi), but at a more economical speed of 14 knots (26 km/h; 16 mph), their range increased to 950 nautical miles (1,760 km; 1,090 mi).

The ships carried an armament that consisted of a single 120 mm (4.7 in) 40-caliber (cal.) gun and four 76 mm (3 in) 40-cal. guns, along with two 450 mm (17.7 in) torpedo tubes. The 102 mm gun was placed on the forecastle and two of the 76 mm guns were mounted abreast the funnels, with the remaining pair at the stern. The torpedo tubes were in single mounts, both on the centerline.

== Ships ==
Construction data
Name	Laid down	launched	Completed	Shipyard
Audace		4 May 1913		Cantiere navale fratelli Orlando, Livorno
Animoso		13 July 1913		Cantiere navale fratelli Orlando, Livorno

== Service history ==
Audace was accidentally sunk after a collision with the freighter SS Brasile on a convoy operation during World War I on 30 August 1916. Animoso took part in frequent operations in the Adriatic Sea against Austro-Hungarian light forces in 1917, as well as bombardments of Austro-Hungarian positions ashore in northern Italy.

Animoso was badly damaged by a boiler explosion on 29 July 1921, which ended her career and led to her disposal in 1923.
