= Cassiopea-class patrol vessel =

Ship class of the Italian Navy

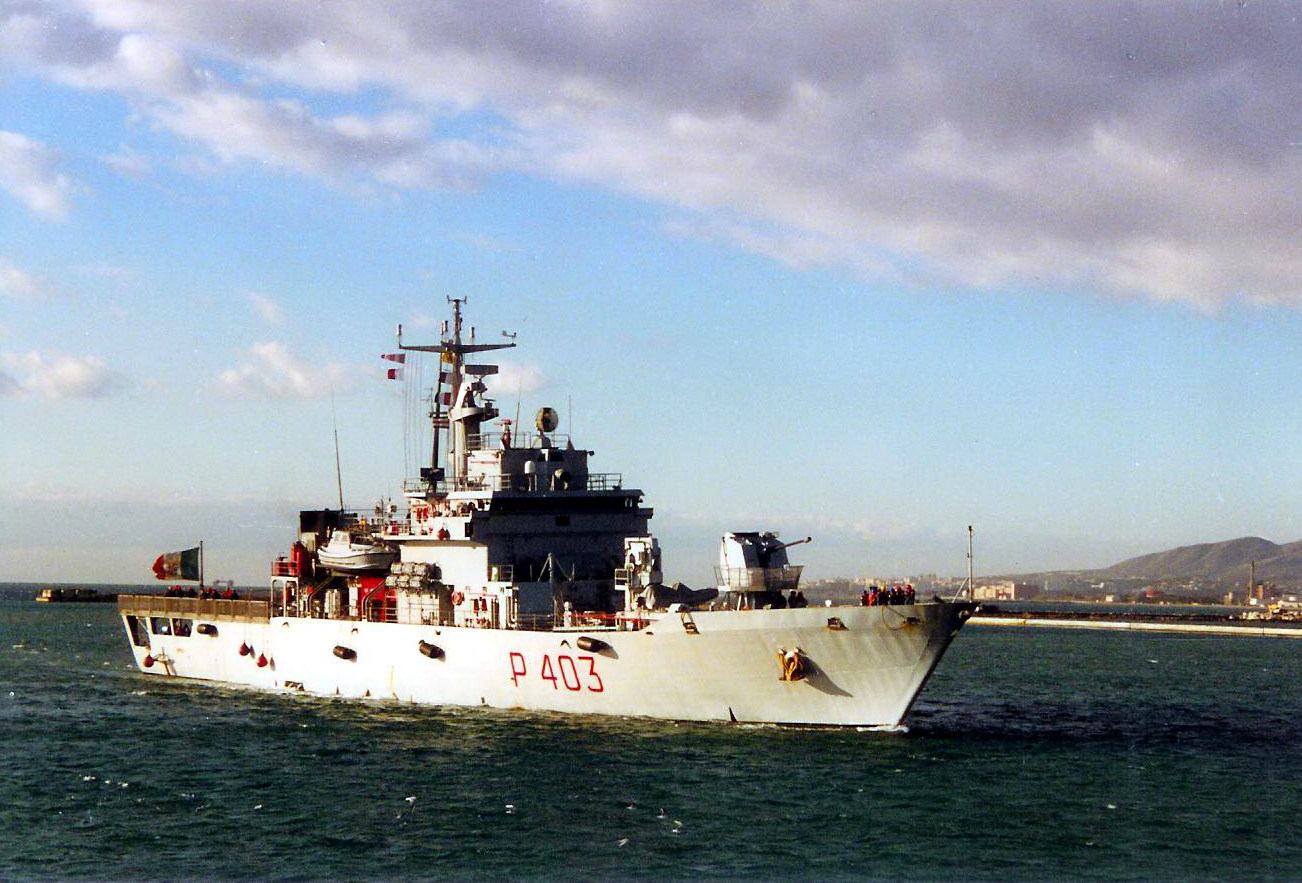
- Patrol ship Spica (P 403)

Class overview
- Name: Cassiopea
- Builders: Fincantieri – Muggiano
- Operators: Italian Navy Albanian Naval Force
- Completed: 4
- Active: Cassiopea (P 401); Libra (P 133); Spica (P 403); Vega (P 404)

General characteristics
- Type: Patrol vessel
- Displacement: 1,130 t (1,110 long tons) standard; 1,500 t (1,500 long tons) full load
- Length: 79.80 m (261 ft 10 in) oa; 71.50 m (234 ft 7 in) pp
- Beam: 11.80 m (38 ft 9 in)
- Draught: 3.60 m (11 ft 10 in)
- Propulsion: - 2 x shafts; - 2 x diesel engines Grandi Motori Trieste BL-230.16 propulsion diesels 5.84 kW (7.83 bhp); - 3 x diesel engine generators Isotta Fraschini ID 36SS6V; - 1 x diesel engine generator Isotta Fraschini VM-V6130T for emergency
- Speed: 21 knots (39 km/h; 24 mph) maximum; 20 knots (37 km/h; 23 mph) continuous
- Range: 3,300 nmi (6,100 km; 3,800 mi) at 17 knots (31 km/h; 20 mph)
- Endurance: 35 days
- Crew: 6 officers, 54 enlisted
- Sensors & processing systems: 1 × SMA SPN-748(V)2 Navigation radar; 1 × AESN SPS-702(v)2 surface search radar; 1 × AESN SPG-70 (RTN 10X) fire control radar; 1 × GEM Elettronica Gemini-DB navigation radar
- Electronic warfare & decoys: Elint equipment
- Armament: 1 × OTO Melara 76/62mm Allargato gun; 2 × OTO Melara 25/80 guns with Oerlikon KBA 25 mm; 2 × 7,62 mm MG 42/59 machine guns
- Aircraft carried: 1 Agusta-Bell AB-212 ASW helicopter
- Aviation facilities: Hangar and flight deck

The Cassiopea class is a series of four heavy patrol boats of the Italian Navy. They were built in the late 1980s on civilian standards. They are designed for patrol in safe areas.

== Development and design ==
In the early 1980s the Italian navy developed two classes of corvettes to replace older vessels. The Minerva class were fully combatant ships to serve as coastal escorts, and equipped with modern sensors and armament, while the Cassiopea class were simpler offshore patrol vessels intended to replace the old Albatros-class corvettes used for fisheries patrol.

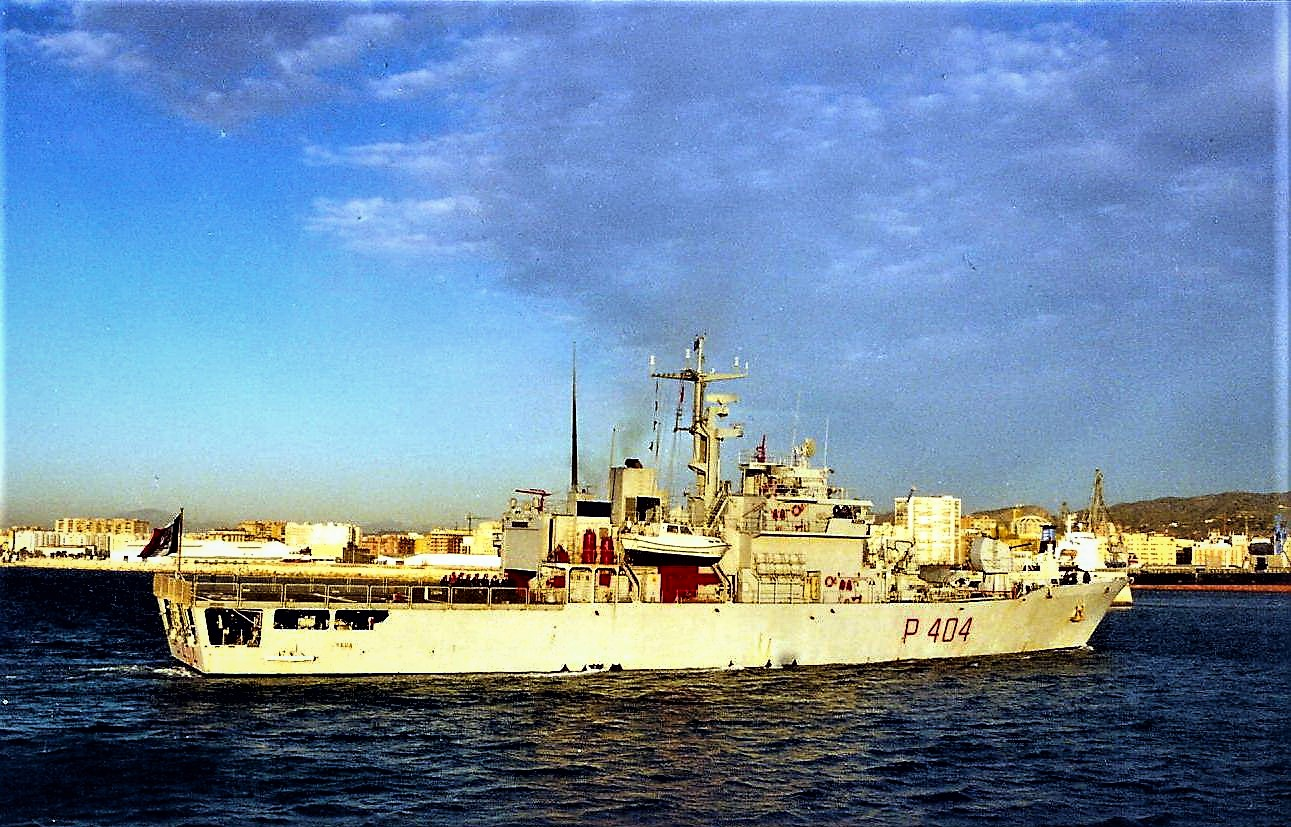
Vega

Construction of four ships (out of eight originally planned) was authorized in December 1982, with funding from the Ministry of Merchant Marine. Orders were placed in December 1986, with construction starting the next year at Fincantieri shipyard, Muggiano. The ships were built to mercantile standards, and the first ship entered service in 1989. A further two ships were cancelled in 1991, prior to the start of construction.

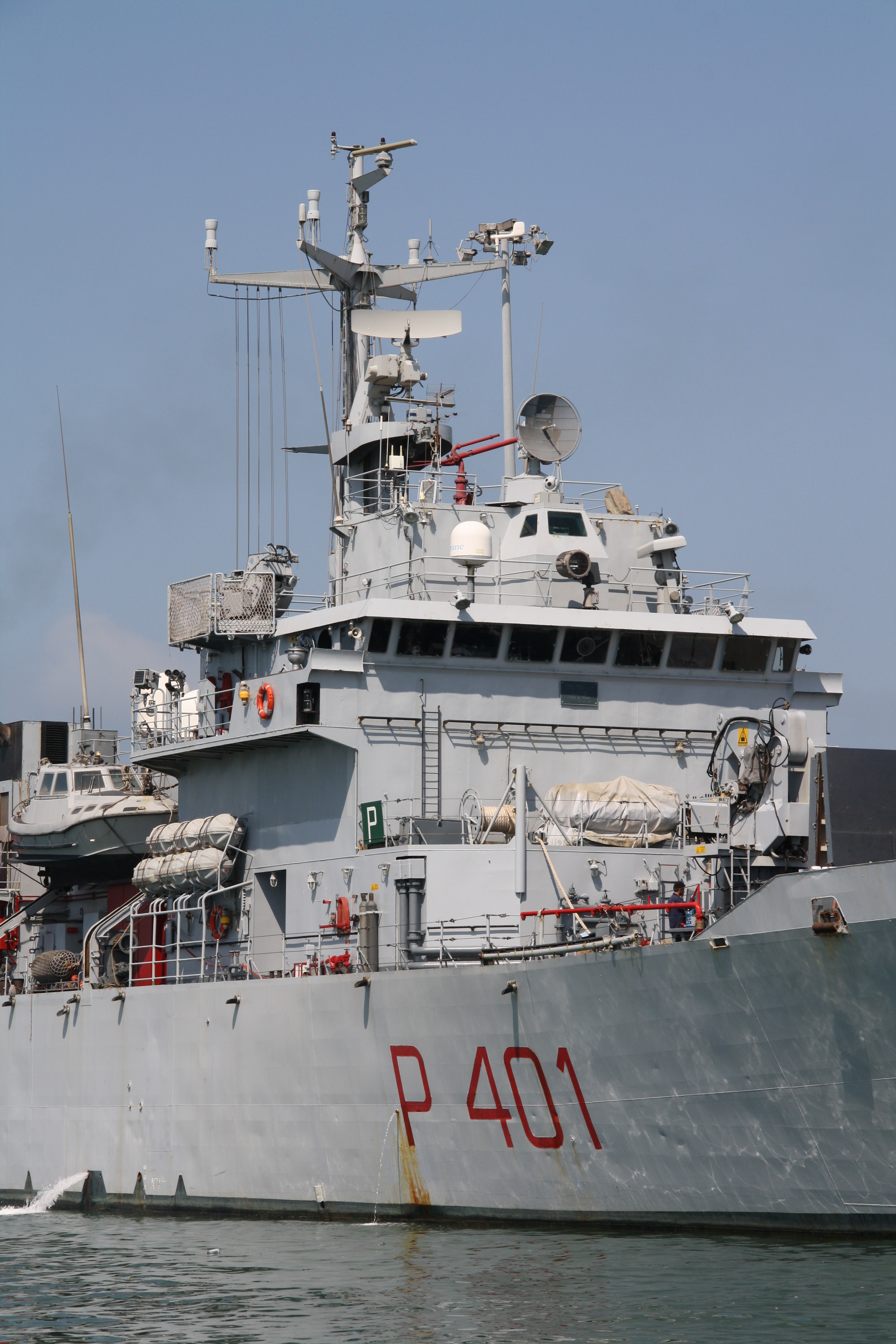
Cassiopea

The ships' main gun armament is a single 76mm/L62 Allargato gun; both gun and fire control systems came from scrapped Bergamini-class frigates. Each ship is fitted with a flight deck and fixed hangar to accommodate a helicopter type Agusta-Bell AB-212 ASW of the Italian navy. Each also carries equipment for dealing with pollution. Between 2012 and 2014 all units were fitted with Selex ES Janus-N IR optronic system. As of 2014 the ships, starting with Libra were fitted with new dual-band navigation (X/Ka) Gemini-DB radar systems from GEM Elettronica.

== Ships ==
Italian Navy - Cassiopea class
Name	Pennant number	Hull number	Laid down	Launched	Commissioned	Motto
Cassiopea	P 401	5846	16 March 1987	19 July 1988	21 October 1989	Adsum
Spica	P 403	5848	5 September 1988	27 May 1989	23 March 1991	Vigile attendo
Vega	P 404	5849	30 June 1989	24 February 1990	8 May 1992	Sempre e ovunque
Albanian Naval Force
Libra	P 133	5847	16 March 1987	27 July 1988	23 March 1991	Patiens vigil audax

== Transfer to the Albanian Navy ==
Albanian Prime Minister Edi Rama announced the takeover of a new warship on Saturday April 5th 2025. It is now learned that this ship is a "Cassiopea" type corvette, the Libra, of the Italian Navy. Its delivery is in process, expected in the coming days. This brand of warship is equipped militarily for tasks mainly in maritime defense and surveillance. The main armament of the "Cassiopea" type is a single Oto-Melara 76/62 Allargato gun, with weapons and fire control systems as used by decommissioned Rizzo/Bergamini-class frigates. It is expected that this ship, after a general service and overhaul, will be active in service for up to the next 15 years. The delivery of the ship will take place in a ceremony which is expected to be attended by the Italian Minister of Defense, Guido Crosetto. The corvette is expected to be delivered in the company of the pride of the Italian Navy, Amerigo Vespucci.
