= Impavido-class destroyer =

Class of two guided-missile destroyers of the Italian Navy

- Impavido

Class overview
- Name: Impavido class
- Operators: Italian Navy
- Preceded by: Impetuoso class
- Succeeded by: Audace class
- Built: 1957–1962
- In commission: 21 November 1963 – 15 July 1992
- Completed: 2
- Retired: 2

General characteristics Data from
- Type: Guided missile destroyer
- Displacement: 3,201 ton standard; 3,941 tons full load
- Length: 130.9 m (429 ft 6 in)
- Beam: 13.6 m (44 ft 7 in)
- Draught: 4.5 m (14 ft 9 in)
- Propulsion: 2 shaft geared turbines; 4 Foster Wheeler boilers, 70,000 hp (52,000 kW)
- Speed: 34 knots (63 km/h; 39 mph)
- Range: 3,300 nmi (6,100 km; 3,800 mi) at 20 kn (37 km/h; 23 mph)
- Complement: 344 (15 officers, 319 enlisted)
- Sensors & processing systems: AN/SPS-12 Air search radar; AN/SPS-39 3D radar; AN/SPG-51 Tartar fire control; AN/SQS-23 sonar
- Armament: 1× Tartar SAM system; 2× 127 mm (5 in)/38 gun; 4× OTO Melara 76 mm (3 in)/L62 MMI; 2× 533 mm (21 in) triple torpedo launchers
- Aircraft carried: 1 Helicopter

The Impavido class were the second group of destroyers built for the Italian Navy after World War II and the first Italian guided missile destroyers. Similar in performance to the US Navy's Charles F. Adams class, these ships were essentially improved Impetuoso-class vessels, with the aft gun-turret being replaced by a Tartar surface-to-air-missile launcher and associated radar.

Two ships were constructed in the 1960s in Italy, Impavido and Intrepido. They were in active service until the ships were retired in 1991 and 1992 respectively.

== Design ==
The Impavido class were the first guided missile destroyers of the Italian Navy. The vessels were commissioned in the early 1960s and were roughly equal to the American Charles F. Adams-class destroyer. Both classes shared the Tartar missile system, with a Mk 13 launcher, and carried around 40 missiles. They had two fire control radars to guide their weaponry and all this was fitted in the aft of the ship. Both classes also had two single 127 mm (5 in) guns, but the American ships had these in single mountings and in a new model, the Mk 42, one fore and the other aft, while the Impavidos made use of an older Mk 38 dual turret.

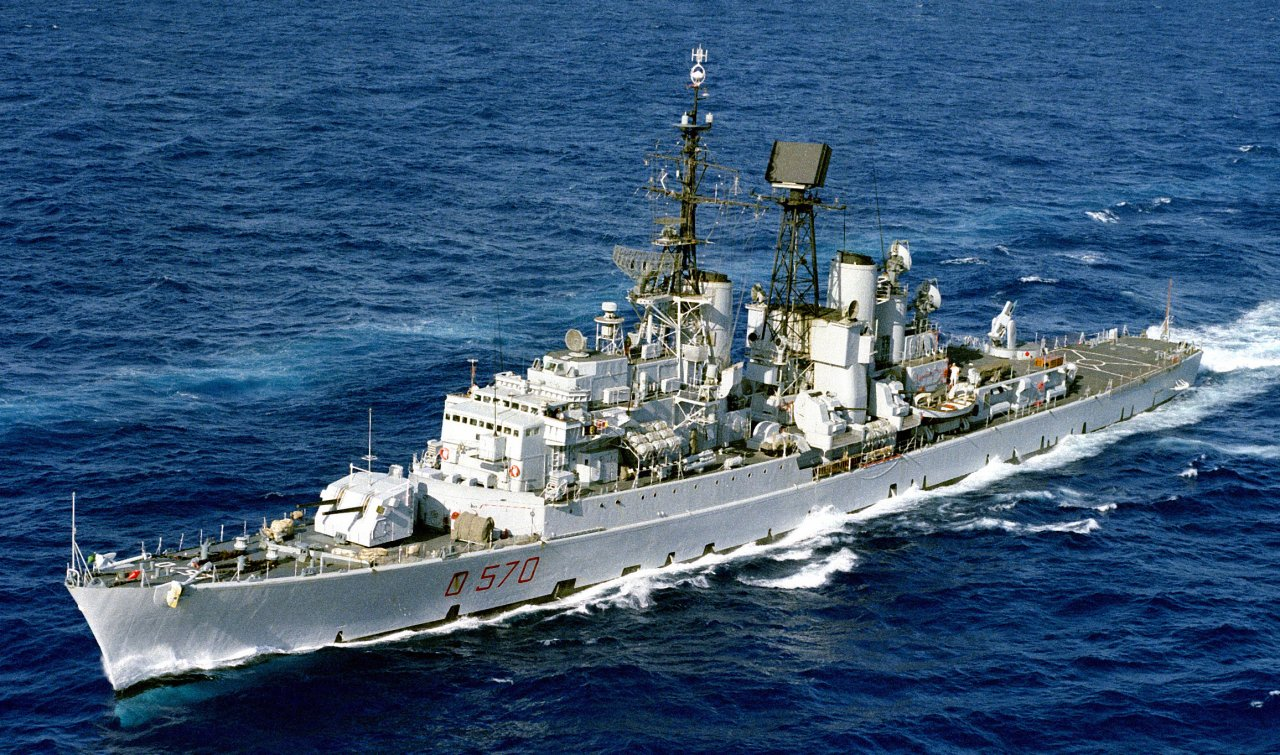
Impavido, in May 1983

One difference between the classes was the secondary weaponry. While both had lightweight torpedo launchers, the rest was different. The Charles F. Adams class had an ASROC launcher, dedicated to anti-submarine warfare tasks, to help counter the growing number of Soviet submarines. The Impavidos did not have such systems, but instead had four model MM (Marina Militare) 76 mm (3 in) guns. In the Mediterranean Sea, where the ships were intended to operate, there was always the danger of air attacks as the main threat to ships. This usually led to the construction of many Italian warships with a heavier short-range air defence armament than normal.

In service the MM guns were not considered satisfactory, despite having decisive improvements over the older American 76 mm guns. Reliability left a lot to be desired, while the lack of a totally automatic mode of fire proved a disadvantage.

A characteristic of these ships were the superstructures, having a much less clean layout than other classes. They had a double line of windows in the main turrion, similar to the Alpino-class frigates.

They became progressively obsolescent, not receiving any important updates in their service lives.

== Ships ==
Name	Pennant number	Builder	Laid down	Launched	Commissioned	Fate
Impavido	D 570	CNR Riva Trigoso	10 June 1957	25 May 1962	16 November 1963	Decommissioned 1992
Intrepido	D 571	Ansaldo, Livorno	16 May 1959	21 October 1962	28 July 1964	Decommissioned 1991

== Sources ==
- Blackman, Raymond V.B. Jane's Fighting Ships 1971–72. London: Sampson Low Marston & Co, 1971. ISBN 0-354-00096-9.
- Gardiner, Robert and Stephen Chumbley (editors). Conway's All The World's Fighting Ships 1947–1995. Annapolis, Maryland, USA: Naval Institute Press, 1995. ISBN 1-55750-132-7.
