= French cruiser Châteaurenault (D 606) =

Italian and French naval ship (1942–1961)

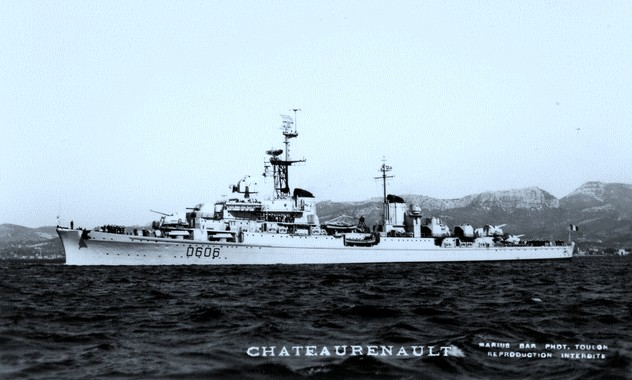
- Chateaurenault, the former Attilio Regolo

History

Italy
- Name: Attilio Regolo
- Ordered: 1937
- Builder: O.T.O., Livorno
- Laid down: 28 September 1939
- Launched: 28 August 1940
- Commissioned: 15 May 1942
- Fate: Ceded to France as war reparations, 1947

History

France
- Name: Chateaurenault
- Namesake: François Louis de Rousselet, Marquis de Châteaurenault
- Commissioned: 1948
- Decommissioned: 1961
- Stricken: 1975
- Fate: Scrapped, 1979

General characteristics Attilio Regolo
- Type: Light cruiser
- Displacement: 3,750 long tons (3,810 t) standard; 5,420 long tons (5,510 t) full load
- Length: 142.2 m (466 ft 6 in) overall
- Beam: 14.4 m (47 ft 3 in)
- Draught: 4.1 m (13 ft 5 in)
- Propulsion: 2 shaft geared turbines; 4 boilers; 110,000 hp (82,000 kW)
- Speed: 41 knots (76 km/h; 47 mph)
- Range: 4,350 nmi (8,060 km; 5,010 mi) at 18 knots (33 km/h; 21 mph)
- Complement: 418
- Sensors & processing systems: Gufo radar
- Armament: 4 × twin 135 mm (5.3 in) guns; 4 × twin 37 mm (1.5 in) guns; 8 × single 20 mm (0.79 in) guns; 2 × quadruple 533 mm (21 in) torpedo tubes; 70 ×mines

Chateaurenault (D 606) was a French Capitani Romani-class light cruiser, acquired as war reparations from Italy in 1947 which served in the French Navy from 1948 to 1961. She was named in honour of François Louis de Rousselet, Marquis de Châteaurenault. In Italian service, the ship was named Attilio Regolo after Marcus Atilius Regulus the Roman statesman and general who was a consul of the Roman Republic in 267 BC and 256 BC.

== History ==
=== Italian service ===
Attilio Regolo was commissioned in August 1942 in Livorno. She was torpedoed by the submarine HMS Unruffled on 7 November 1942, and remained in drydock for several months with her bow shattered. She was interned in Port Mahon in the island of Menorca, Spain, after the armistice on 9 September 1943.

=== French service ===
After the Peace Treaty on 10 February 1947, she and her sister ship Scipione Africano were transferred to France as war reparations (Scipione Africano was renamed Guichen). The ships were extensively rebuilt for the French Navy by La Seyne dockyard with new anti-aircraft-focused armament and fire-control systems in 1951–1954 with the following changes:

- Armament
  - 6 – 105 mm guns (three twin turrets of German origin)
  - 10 – 57 mm guns (5 twin turrets)
  - 12 – 550 mm torpedo tubes
- Sensors: Radar DRBV 20 A, DRBV 11, DRBC 11, DRBC 30, Sonar
- Crew: 353

The ships were decommissioned in 1961.
