= Italian ship San Giorgio =

San Giorgio this name has been borne by at least three ships of the Italian Navy and may refer to:

- Italian cruiser San Giorgio, a San Giorgio-class cruiser launched in 1908 and scuttled in 1941.
- Italian destroyer San Giorgio, launched in 1941 as the Capitani Romani-class cruiser Pompeo Magno she was rebuilt as a destroyer and renamed in 1955. She was decommissioned in 1980
- Italian ship San Giorgio (L9892), a San Giorgio-class amphibious transport dock launched in 1987.
