= Italian ship San Marco =

San Marco this name has been borne by at least three ships of the Italian Navy and may refer to:

- Italian cruiser San Marco, a San Giorgio-class cruiser launched in 1908 and found sunk in 1945.
- Italian destroyer San Marco, launched in 1941 as the Capitani Romani-class cruiser Giulio Germanico she was rebuilt as a destroyer and renamed in 1955. She was decommissioned in 1971
- Italian ship San Marco (L 9893), a San Giorgio-class amphibious transport dock launched in 1987.
