= Comandanti Medaglie d'Oro-class destroyer =

Italian WWII-era warship class

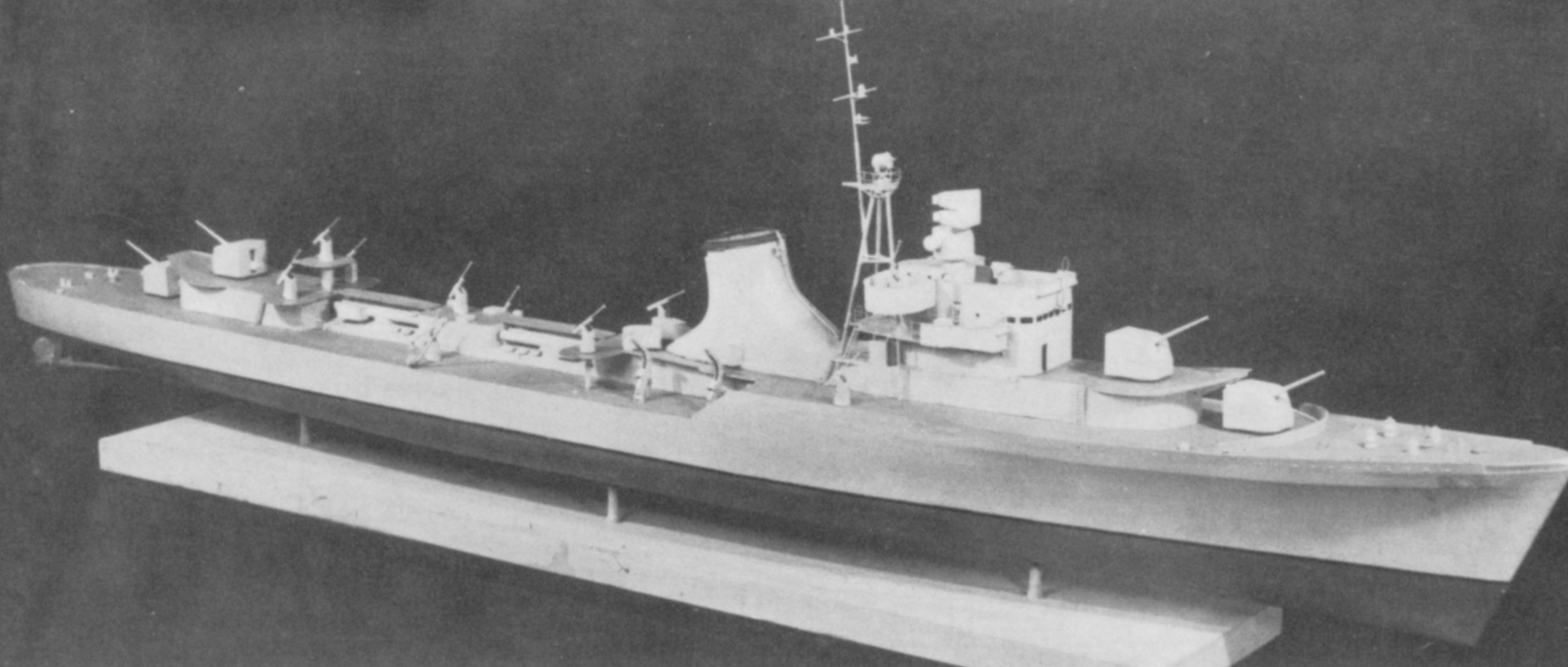
- Builder's model of the first-series ships

Class overview
- Name: Comandanti Medaglie d'Oro class
- Operators: Regia Marina
- Preceded by: Soldati class
- Succeeded by: Impetuoso class
- Built: 1942–1943
- Planned: 20
- Completed: 0
- Canceled: 4
- Scrapped: 16

General characteristics (1st series)
- Type: Destroyer
- Displacement: 2,100 long tons (2,100 t) (standard); 3,000 long tons (3,000 t) (full load)
- Length: 120.7 m (396 ft) (o/a)
- Beam: 12.3 m (40 ft 4 in)
- Draught: 3.6 m (11 ft 10 in)
- Installed power: 3 three-drum boilers; 60,000 shp (45,000 kW)
- Propulsion: 2 shafts; 2 geared steam turbines
- Speed: 35 knots (65 km/h; 40 mph)
- Range: 3,300 nmi (6,100 km; 3,800 mi) at 20 knots (37 km/h; 23 mph)
- Complement: 15 officers and 262 enlisted men
- Sensors & processing systems: EC-3 ter Gufo search radar
- Armament: 4 × single 135 mm (5.3 in) guns; 12 × single 37 mm (1.5 in) AA guns; 2 × triple 533 mm (21 in) torpedo tubes; 52 mines; 2-4 depth charge throwers, 64 depth charges

The Comandanti Medaglie d'Oro class were a group of 20 destroyers ordered for the Regia Marina (Royal Italian Navy) during World War II. Nine had been laid down by the time of the Italian armistice in September 1943 and all but one of those ships which had not yet been laid down were cancelled. Of those that had been laid down, none had been launched by that time and all were subsequently scrapped.

== Design and description ==
By mid-1941, the Ministero della Marina (Navy Ministry) had concluded that its existing destroyer building program was insufficient to replace its losses and authorized a new design that would incorporate the war experience gained thus far. The anti-aircraft armament of the preceding Soldati class had proven inadequate as had their sustained speed and range. General Carlo Sigismondi of the Corps of Naval Engineering, assisted by Lieutenant Colonel Giuseppe Malagoli, decided upon an enlarged version of the Soldatis with 20% more horsepower and 30% more range. To improve stability, he decided to increase the beam by over two meters (6 ft 7 in). Perhaps the most significant change was the much more capable armament of 135-millimetre (5.3 in) guns whose ability to elevate to 45 degrees gave them a limited ability to deal with low-flying aircraft and the greatly increased number of 37-millimetre (1.5 in) AA guns.

The Comandanti Medaglie d'Oro-class ships had a length between perpendiculars of 115 meters (377 ft 4 in) and an overall length of 120.7 meters (396 ft). The ships had a beam of 12.3 meters (40 ft 4 in) and a mean draft of 3.6 meters (11 ft 10 in). They were estimated to displace 2,100 metric tons (2,100 long tons) at standard load, and 3,000 metric tons (3,000 long tons) at deep load. Their crew was intended to consist of 15 officers and 262 enlisted men.

The Comandanti Medaglie d'Oros were powered by two Parsons geared steam turbines, each driving one propeller shaft using steam supplied by a trio of three-drum boilers. They were grouped together in a single compartment aft of the bridge and exhausted through a single funnel. The turbines, each in their own engine room aft of the boiler room, were designed to produce a total of 60,000 shaft horsepower (45,000 kW) and a speed of 35 knots (65 km/h; 40 mph) in service. The ships carried a maximum of 740 metric tons (730 long tons) of fuel oil to give them an estimated range of 3,300 nautical miles (6,100 km; 3,800 mi) at a speed of 20 knots (37 km/h; 23 mph).

The propulsion machinery for the fourth ship of the third series, Comandante Esposito, was going to be rearranged to improve the survivability of the Comandanti Medaglie d'Oro class as the existing layout meant that a single hit could disable all of the boilers and immobilize the ship. At the cost of some additional length, the Italians intended to adopt the unit system of machinery in which each turbine was paired with two boilers, each in their own compartment and using their own funnel, so that one "unit" of machinery could still work if the other was knocked out.

=== Armament and sensors ===
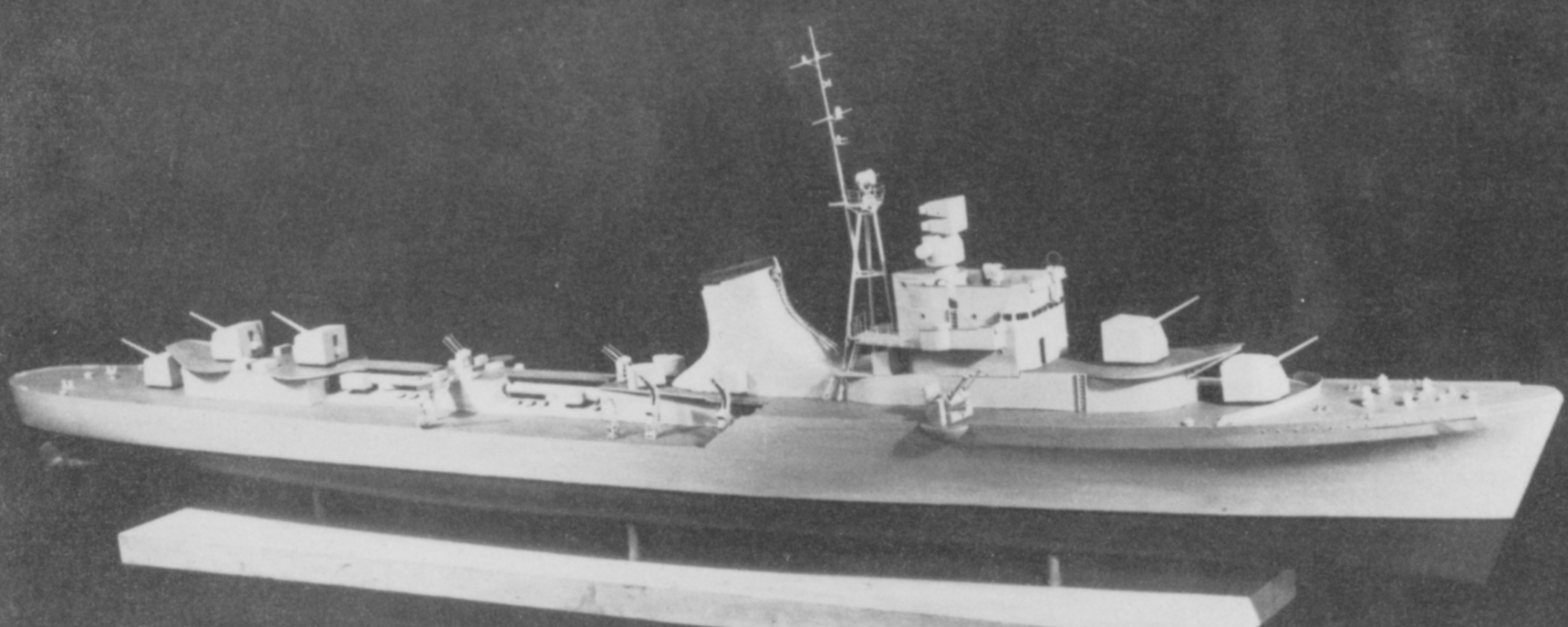
Builder's model of the second-series ships

Their main battery would have consisted of 45-caliber Cannone da 135/45 OTO Mod. 1937 guns, the number of which and distribution varied between the ships. The first series of eight ships would have had four single shielded mounts, one superfiring pair fore and aft of the superstructure. The second and third series would have had an extra single mount at the aft end of the superstructure. The guns fired 32.7-kilogram (72 lb) shells at a muzzle velocity of 825 meters per second (2,710 ft/s) to a range of 19,600 meters (21,400 yd) at their maximum elevation of 45 degrees.

The secondary armament of the first series of the Comandanti Medaglie d'Oro-class ships was provided by a dozen single mounts for 54-caliber Breda Cannone-Mitragliera da 37/54 Mod. 1939 AA guns. It had an effective range of 4,000 meters (4,400 yd) with its 0.823-kilogram (1.8 lb) projectiles fired at a muzzle velocity of 800 meters per second (2,600 ft/s). Its rate of fire was selectable, with settings for 60, 90 and 120 rounds per minute. The later ships were intended to have two quadruple mounts for the 37 mm guns abreast the bridge on the forecastle deck and a pair of quadruple mounts for German 65-caliber 20 mm (0.8 in) Flakvierling AA guns on the centerline amidships (three on third series). Nighttime illumination was to be provided by a pair of multi-barrel rocket launchers, one mount on each side of the bridge.

The ships would have been equipped with six 533-millimeter (21 in) torpedo tubes for SI 270 torpedoes in two triple mounts amidships. Possessing a 270-kilogram (595 lb) warhead, the torpedo had ranges of 4,000 meters (4,374 yd) at 46 knots (85 km/h; 53 mph) and 12,000 meters (13,123 yd) at 29 knots (54 km/h; 33 mph). The Italians intended to provide them with a sonar system of an unknown type for anti-submarine work. They would have been fitted with a pair of depth charge throwers and 64 depth charges. The Comandanti Medaglie d'Oros would have been able carry 52 mines as well.

The first-series ships would have been fitted with a single RM-2 gunnery director on the roof of the bridge which was equipped with an EC-3 ter Gufo (Owl) search radar. The second series were intended to incorporate another director amidships between the torpedo tubes to control the aft guns.

== Ships ==
The ships were named after captains who were posthumous recipients of the Medaglie d'Oro (Gold Medal of Military Valor). The first series of eight ships was ordered on 27 September 1941 and the second series of eight ships was ordered a year later. Four ships of the third series were ordered on 7 October 1942 and another four were authorized. These last four were cancelled in April 1943 in favor of eight Ariete-class torpedo boats. Allied bombing in 1943 damaged the facilities at the Livorno shipyard and caused two of the destroyers under construction there, Comandante Borsini and Comandante Fontana, to be reassigned to the second series while Comandante Giorgis and Comandante Giobbe were transferred to the first series. Comandante Margottini was the only ship to be launched as the Germans did it in early 1944 to make the slipway available for new construction. By August 1943 material shortages had significantly slowed the pace of building so that the launching of the third-series ships was delayed until early 1946. By this date virtually all of the material for the first series and, half of the material for the second series had been allocated. Nothing for the third ships of the third series had been ordered and they were cancelled after the Armistice.

Name	Builder	Laid down	Launched	Percentage complete as of 15 August 1943	Fate
First series
Comandante Toscano	Cantiere navale di Riva Trigoso	14 December 1942	Never	17	Badly damaged by bombs, subsequently scrapped by the Germans
Comandante De Cristofaro	Cantiere navale di Riva Trigoso	6 March 1943	Never	15.5	Badly damaged by bombs, subsequently scrapped by the Germans
Comandante Dell'Anno	Cantiere navale di Riva Trigoso	14 February 1943	Never	19	Scrapped by the Germans, 1944
Comandante Casana	Cantiere navale di Riva Trigoso	14 February 1943	Never	18	Scrapped by the Germans, 1944
Comandante Baroni	Odero-Terni-Orlando, Livorno	14 December 1942	Never	19.5	Scrapped by the Germans sometime after the Armistice
Comandante Margottini	Odero-Terni-Orlando, Livorno	10 March 1943	Early 1944	20	Sunk by aircraft, 23 September 1944
Comandante Borsini	Odero-Terni-Orlando, Livorno	29 April 1943	Never	17.5	Scrapped by the Germans
Comandante Fontana	Odero-Terni-Orlando, Livorno	Late 1943	Never	9	Scrapped
Second series
Comandante Giorgis	Cantiere navale di Riva Trigoso	Planned for September 1943	Never	3	Broken up
Comandante Giobbe	Cantiere navale di Riva Trigoso	Planned for October 1943	Never	3	Broken up
Comandante Moccagatta	Odero-Terni-Orlando, Livorno	Planned for November 1943	Never	3	Broken up
Comandante Rodocancchi	Odero-Terni-Orlando, Livorno	Planned for December 1943	Never	3	Broken up
Comandante Botti	Cantieri Riuniti dell'Adriatico, Trieste	1 August 1943	Never	4	Scrapped by the Germans
Comandante Ruta	Cantieri Riuniti dell'Adriatico, Trieste	16 August 1943	Never	4	Scrapped by the Germans
Comandante Novaro	Cantieri Riuniti dell'Adriatico, Trieste	Never	Never	3	Broken up
Comandante Fiorelli	Cantieri Riuniti dell'Adriatico, Trieste	Never	Never	3	Broken up
Third series
Comandante Corsi	Cantieri Riuniti dell'Adriatico, Trieste	Cancelled			
Comandante Giannattasio	Cantieri Riuniti dell'Adriatico, Trieste	Cancelled			
Comandante Milano	Cantieri Riuniti dell'Adriatico, Trieste	Cancelled			
Comandante Esposito	Cantieri Riuniti dell'Adriatico, Trieste	Cancelled			

== Bibliography ==
- Bagnasco, Erminio & Grossman, Mark (1990). "The Comandanti Class Destroyers of the Italian Navy 1942–1943". Warship International. XXVII (3): 258–276. ISSN 0043-0374.
- Bagnasco, Erminio & Grossman, Mark (1990). "Addendum to The Comandanti Class Destroyers of the Italian Navy 1942–1943". Warship International. XXVII (4): 360. ISSN 0043-0374.
- Brescia, Maurizio (2012). Mussolini's Navy: A Reference Guide to the Regina Marina 1930–45. Naval Institute Press. ISBN 978-1-59114-544-8.
- Campbell, John (1985). Naval Weapons of World War Two. Naval Institute Press. ISBN 0-87021-459-4.
- Fraccaroli, Aldo (1968). Italian Warships of World War II. Ian Allan. ISBN 0-7110-0002-6.
- Roberts, John (1980). "Italy". In Chesneau, Roger (ed.). Conway's All the World's Fighting Ships 1922–1946. Mayflower Books. pp. 280–317. ISBN 0-8317-0303-2.
- Whitley, M. J. (1988). Destroyers of World War 2: An International Encyclopedia. Naval Institute Press. ISBN 1-85409-521-8.
