= French cruiser Guichen =

Guichen has been the name of a number of ships of the French Navy named in honour of Luc Urbain de Bouëxic, comte de Guichen:

- French cruiser Guichen (1897), a protected cruiser launched in 1897 and struck in 1921
- French cruiser Guichen (D 607), the rebuilt Capitani Romani-class cruiser Italian cruiser Scipione Africano acquired in 1948 and struck in 1961
