= Operation Scylla =

1943 Italian naval operation in World War II

Coordinates: 38°3′20.20″N 15°35′28.35″E

- Part of the Battle of the Mediterranean of the Second World War
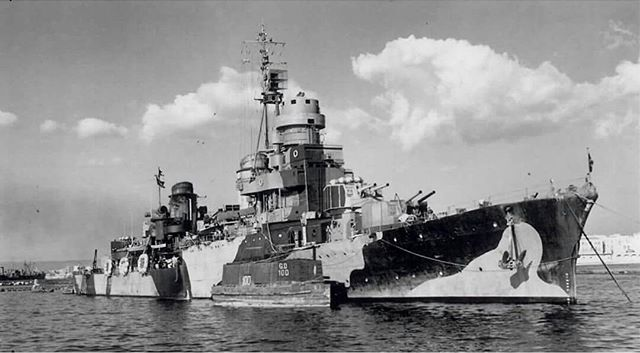
- Italian light cruiser Scipione Africano at Taranto
Date	17/18 July 1943
Location	Strait of Messina
Result	Italian victory

Belligerents
United Kingdom	Italy

Commanders and leaders
(United Kingdom) Dennis Jermain	(Kingdom of Italy) Ernesto Pellegrini

Strength
4 Motor Torpedo Boats	1 light cruiser

Casualties and losses
12 killed 1 MTB sunk 2 MTBs damaged	2 wounded 1 light cruiser lightly damaged

Operation Scylla (Italian: Operazione Scilla) was the transit of Scipione Africano, a Regia Marina (Italian Royal Navy) Capitani Romani-class cruiser, on the night of 17/18 July 1943, during the Second World War. The cruiser sailed from La Spezia in the Tyrrhenian Sea to Taranto in the Ionian Sea during the Allied invasion of Sicily.

Scipione Africano fought a night engagement against four British motor torpedo boats (MTBs) during its passage of the Strait of Messina. At least two MTBs launched their torpedoes, whilst the cruiser fired its main and secondary guns while sailing at maximum speed. An MTB was destroyed and one damaged; Scipione Africano received superficial damage after being fired on by mistake by Axis coastal artillery. The action was the only time that an Italian warship made effective use of surface radar during an engagement in the war.

== Background ==
=== Allied blockade of Sicily ===
During the Allied invasion of Sicily (Operation Husky, 9 July – 17 August 1943) British Motor Torpedo Boats (MTBs) and Motor Gun Boats moved from Algeria to Malta, thence to captured ports in Sicily. The Axis withdrawal from Sicily (Unternehmen Lehrgang to the Germans) took place from 3 to 17 August. The boats patrolled the Strait of Messina and laid ambushes, waiting for Axis ships and landing craft; with engines off, the boat crews listening for ship engines. Lieutenant Denis Jermain, the senior officer of four boats of the 10th MTB Flotilla on patrol during the night of 17/18 July 1943 had decided that when attacking an Axis ship, one boat would act as a decoy, making as much noise as possible, for the other boats discreetly to move into positions to launch torpedoes.

=== Scipione Africano ===
The Italian Capitani Romani-class cruiser Scipione Africano (Scipione) was one of four ships of the class to be built and was equipped with an EC-3 ter Gufo (Owl) radar set. Gufo sets were Italian-made and had come into service in early 1942. Scipione was based at La Spezia in the region of Liguria, on the north-western coast of Italy. When the Allied invasion of Sicily began, anticipating a blockade of the Strait of Messina by American and British naval forces, the Regia Marina ordered Scipione Africano (Captain Ernesto Pellegrini) to sail from La Spezia down the west coast of Italy to Taranto in Apulia, to remedy the lack of fast cruisers in the Ionian Sea.

== Prelude ==
=== Operation Scylla (Operazione Scilla) ===
On 15 July 1943, Scipione departed La Spezia for Naples and arrived that evening, shadowed by a British seaplane. Scipione embarked an air liaison team and a Metox high-frequency radar warning receiver. She sailed again at 18:15 on 16 July and entered the Straits of Messina at 00:20 on 17 July, with a full moon rising from the south. Some days before, on the night of 12/13 July, British motor torpedo boat MTB 81 had sunk the German submarine U-561 in the northern approaches of the straits.

== Night action ==
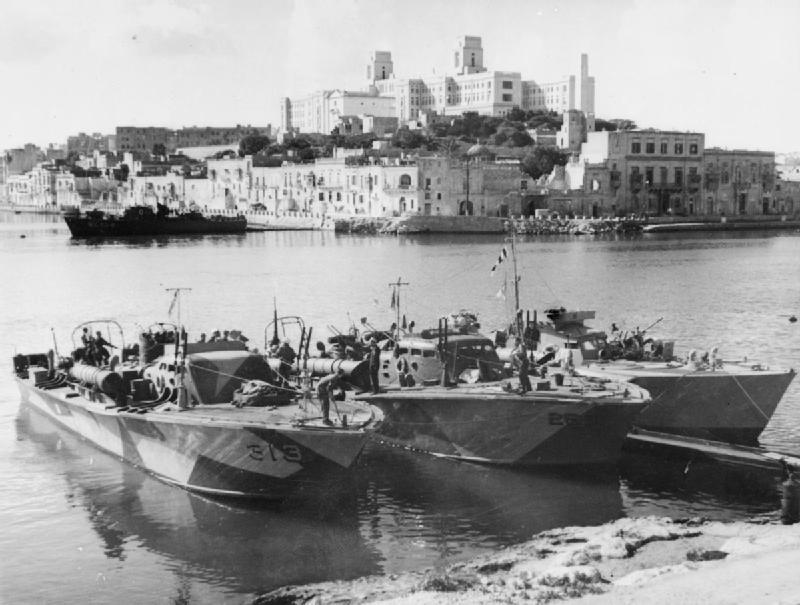
Three British MTBs moored at Malta, MTB 313 at left

As she reached the straits, Scipione detected four small vessels on its Gufo set, lying 10,000 m (10 km; 6.2 mi) ahead, between Reggio di Calabria and Cape Pellaro. At first, Pellegrini thought that they were friendly Marinefährprähme (motor barges). At 02:13, the movement of the leading vessel convinced Pellegrini that the boats were Allied MTBs and he ordered an increase in speed from 24 kn (28 mph; 44 km/h) to 30 kn (35 mph; 56 km/h).

The MTBs were four British Elco boats from the 10th MTB Flotilla (Lieutenant Dennis Jermain) based at Augusta, comprising MTB 260 (Lieutenant H. F. Wadds, R.A.N.V.R.), MTB 313 (Lieutenant Alec Foster), MTB 315 (Lieutenant L. E. Newall, R.N.Z.N.V.R.) and MTB 316 (Lieutenant R. B. Adams). The British MTBs were lying in wait for Axis landing craft and E-boats. Jermain, on MTB 315, wrote later,

I was caught completely napping. We were lying with engines stopped two miles south of Messina, in a flat calm with a full moon silhouetting us nicely. (...) We never dreamed that a cruiser will be able to get down there unseen through our patrols.

Jermain gave the alarm and ordered the other boats to start up and scatter. With no time to make signals, Jermain moved MTB 315 to the east, leaving two boats for each side of Scipione. Jermain intended to feint with MTB 315 to attract the attention of the cruiser and leave the other boats in a better position for attack.

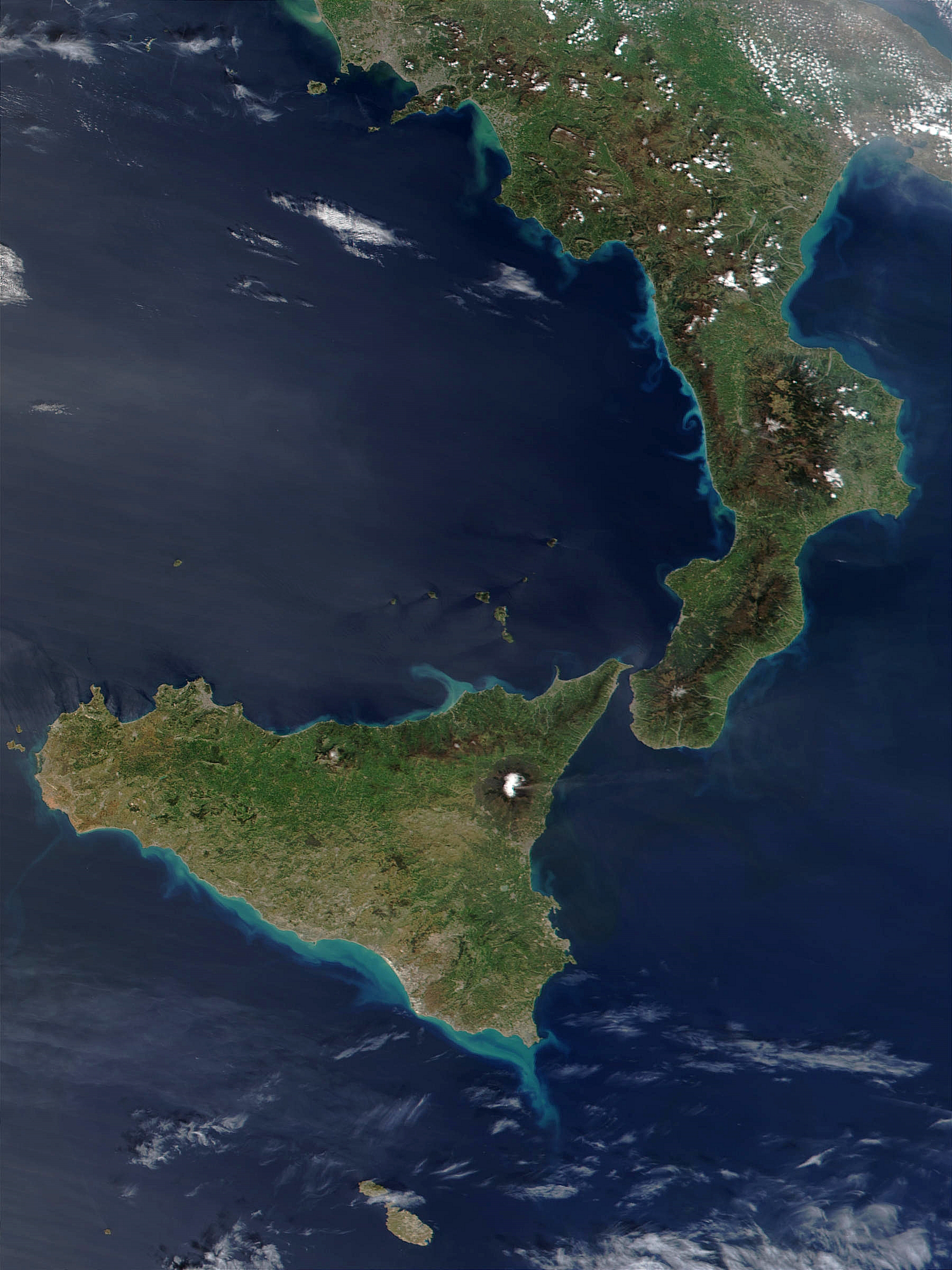
Satellite photograph of Sicily, the Strait of Messina and Calabria on the mainland

Pellegrini had turned his ship to 200 degrees, heading to a point between MTB 313 and MTB 316. The speed of the cruiser surprised the British and it was only 1,400 m (1,500 yd) away by the time they were ready to fire torpedoes. Scipione opened fire with all guns, with a precision that Pellegrini said "left him amazed". The Italian report claims that the engagement lasted no more than three minutes and that the first Allied craft to be hit by 13.5 cm (5.3 in) rounds was the closest boat to starboard, which was left in a "sinking condition". This was MTB 313, only 270 m (300 yd) distant from Scipione. MTB 313 was ready to launch torpedoes, when Foster was wounded in the leg and the spare officer of the flotilla, sub-lieutenant John McKim was mortally wounded. One torpedo passed just ahead of Scipione and the damaged MTB limped away.

MTB 260 was also on the starboard side of the cruiser and claimed a hit. After being fired on by Scipione, MTB 260 escaped with minor damage. The Italian report says that she was set on fire. MTB 316 was about 46 m (50 yd) away to port of Scipione when it was fired on. The MTB was hit and blew up just a few seconds later, the wreck sinking with all hands. The explosion took place so close to the cruiser that fragments of MTB 316 fell aboard Scipione. The analysis of these remains produced some controversy, when Italian sources claimed to have sunk MTB 305, which was not in the Mediterranean, because of an inscription from a recovered wooden panel.

Scipione was chased down the strait by MTB 315 and MTB 260 until she turned to port for Taranto. Pellegrini reported that one of the craft on the port side fired two torpedoes which Scipione evaded. The boat was MTB 315, which Scipione engaged with its heavy machine-guns. At the end of the action, Scipione was bombarded by German and Italian coastal artillery, which caused splinter damage and wounded two seamen. British sources recorded an air attack on Scipione by Axis aircraft, not mentioned by Pellegrino. Scipione reached Taranto at 09:46 on 18 July.

== Aftermath ==
=== Subsequent operations ===
About an hour after Scipione passed the straits, the Italian submarine Ambra, escorted by the torpedo boat Partenope, reached Messina, also from La Spezia. Ambra was to attack Allied shipping at Syracuse with MT explosive motorboats (MTRs) on the night of 17/18 July but the operation was cancelled after the submarine was depth charged and damaged by a 221 Squadron Vickers Wellington; Ambra suffered no casualties and limped back to Messina. The morning after the action, Sub-Lieutenant McKim was buried at sea off Augusta. No traces of MTB 316 and her crew were found by Allied forces. The following night MTB 75 was hit and seriously damaged by shore batteries in the Straits of Messina, while on the evening of 19 July, an unidentified U-boat was depth-charged by British small units and had a narrow escape off Reggio di Calabria. From 4 to 17 August, Scipione and the old light cruiser Luigi Cadorna laid four defensive minefields in the Gulf of Taranto and the Gulf of Squillace. The day after the Cassibile armistice was made public, Scipione escorted the corvette Baionetta, transporting the Italian royal family from Pescara to Brindisi where she came under German air attack. Scipione ferried the new head of government, General Pietro Badoglio and his cabinet to Malta.

== Orders of battle ==
=== Italian cruiser ===
Scipio Africano
Ship	Flag	Notes
Scipione Africano	Kingdom of Italy	Capitani Romani-class cruiser

=== Allied ships ===
10th MTB Flotilla
Ship	Flag	Type	Notes
MTB 260	Royal Navy	Elco motor torpedo boat	Minor damage
MTB 313	Royal Navy	Elco motor torpedo boat	Damaged
MTB 315	Royal Navy	Elco motor torpedo boat	Flag, Lieutenant Dennis Jermain
MTB 316	Royal Navy	Elco motor torpedo boat	Sunk, no survivors

== See also ==
- Gufo radar

== Bibliography ==
Books

- Andò, Elio (1994). Incrociatori leggeri classe "Capitane Romani" [Roman Captain Class Light Cruisers]. Navi da guerra della seconda guerra mondiale (in Italian). Parma: Albertelli. ISBN 978-88-85909-45-8.
- Baroni, Piero (2007). La guerra dei radar: il suicidio dell'Italia: 1935/1943 [The Radar War: Italy's Suicide: 1935/1943] (in Italian). Milano: Greco & Greco. ISBN 978-8-87-980431-8.
- Cocchia, Aldo (1966). La guerra di mine [The Mine War]. La Marina italiana nella seconda guerra mondiale [The Italian Navy in the Second World War] (in Italian). Vol. XVIII. Roma: Ufficio Storico della Marina Militare. OCLC 496647256.
- Fioravanzo, Giuseppe (1964). I Messi D'Assalto [The Attack on Messina]. La Marina italiana nella seconda guerra mondiale [The Italian Navy in the Second World War] (in Italian). Vol. XIV. Roma: Ufficcio Storico della Marina Militare. OCLC 946586165.
- Frieser, K-H.; Schmider, K.; Schönherr, K.; Schreiber, G.; Ungváry, K.; Wegner, B. (2017) [2007]. Frieser, K-H. (ed.). The Eastern Front 1943–1944: The War in the East and on the Neighbouring Fronts. Germany and the Second World War. Vol. VIII. Translated by Smerin, B.; Wilson, B. (eng trans. Oxford University Press, New York ed.). Potsdam: Militärgeschichtliches Forschungsamt (Research Institute for Military History). ISBN 978-0-19-872346-2.
  - Schreiber, G. "Part VI The War on Neighbouring Fronts IV. The End of the North African Campaign and the War in Italy, 1943 to 1945 3. The Attack on 'Fortress Europe': Sicily 1943". In Frieser et al. (2017).
- Greene, Jack; Massignani, Alessandro (1998). The Naval War in the Mediterranean, 1940–1943. London: Chatham. ISBN 978-1-88-511961-2.
- Pope, Dudley (1998). Flag 4: The Battle of Coastal Forces in the Mediterranean 1939–45. London: Chatham. ISBN 1-86176-067-1.
- Pope, Dudley (2014) [1950]. Flag 4: The Battle of Coastal Forces in the Mediterranean 1939–45. Looe: House of Stratus. ISBN 978-0-7551-3062-7.
- Reynolds, L. C.; Cooper, H. F. (1999). Mediterranean MTBs at War: Short MTB Flotilla Operations, 1939–45. Stroud: Sutton. ISBN 978-0-75-092274-6.

Journals

- Pellegrini Dai Coi, Maurizio de (2012). "Scipione: posto di combattimento" [Scipione: Combat Report]. Rivista Marittima (in Italian) (January–February). Roma: Ministero della difesa. OCLC 807147945.
- Preston, Antony; Ando, Elio (1978). Roberts, John (ed.). "Capitani Romani". Warship. V. London: Conway Maritime Press. ISSN 0142-6222.

Newspapers

- Monarca, Ludovica (23 July 2011). "Ricordi di battaglia e di vita vissuta a bordo di Scipione" [Memories of Battle and life Lived aboard Scipio]. Il Tirreno (in Italian). Livorno. Archived from the original on 3 August 2018.

Websites

- Kindell, D. (12 February 2011). G., Smith (ed.). "Casualty Lists of the Royal Navy and Dominion Navies, World War 2". naval-history.net.
