= Ugo Tiberio =

Italian engineer, naval officer & university teacher (1904-1980)

- Born: 19 August 1904; Campobasso, Kingdom of Italy
- Died: 17 May 1980 (aged 75); Livorno, Italy
- Military career
- Allegiance: Kingdom of Italy
- Branch: Regia Marina
- Rank: Lieutenant colonel, Naval Weapons Corps
- Conflicts: World War II
- Awards: Order of the Crown of Italy

Ugo Tiberio (Campobasso, 19 August 1904 – Livorno, 17 May 1980) was an Italian engineer, naval officer and university teacher, best known for his role in the development of the Gufo radar. He was the nephew of naval officer and scientist Vincenzo Tiberio.

== Biography ==
Born in Campobasso in 1904 from Alberto Tiberio and Maria Rachele De Feo, he was directed to a career in the Navy by his maternal uncle Vincenzo de Feo. After graduating in engineering at the University of Naples in 1927, he specialized in electrotechnics at the Higher School of Engineering in Rome in 1932. In 1934-1935 he fulfilled his compulsory military service in the Royal Italian Army, with the rank of second lieutenant in the Engineering Corps, and in July 1935 he was transferred at his own request to the Royal Italian Navy, with the rank of lieutenant in the Naval Weapons Corps. He worked as a researcher in the Higher Institute of Radio Transmissions in Rome until 1936, when he was exonerated from active service. In the same year, together with his colleague Professor Nello Carrara, Tiberio developed a system for the localization of objects at a distance with magnetic waves called the EC1 "radio telemeter", an early form of radar. The commands of the Regia Marina, however, did not realize the importance of this discovery, and Tiberio was forced to relegate his radar studies to a "second job", with scarce funds and few collaborators.

Tiberio was recalled into service in January 1937, following Italy's involvement in the Spanish Civil War, resuming his studies within the Royal Electrotechnical and Communications Institute (Regio Istituto Elettrotecnico e delle Comunicazioni della Marina, RIEC) in Livorno, where he worked until 1943. From 1937 to 1953 he was also a teacher at the Naval Academy of Livorno; in 1938 he was promoted to the rank of captain of the Naval Weapons Corps, and in 1940 he became teacher of electrotechnics at the University of Palermo. He was able to solve the theoretical problem of calculating the intensity of the echo, giving substantial contribution to the development of the radar equation, which he described in an article published in 1939; he proposed and discussed two implementation schemes, one with frequency modulation and one with pulses, proposing to test both while giving preference to the first, on which he based his radar prototype. He also suggested the use of the Doppler effect for locating vehicles; he developed a device based on this principle which he called the radiotachometer, due to the greater accuracy in measuring the speed of objects.

In June 1940, a few days before Italy's entry into the Second World War, Tiberio married Miss Noemi Fontana, who however suddenly died shortly after their wedding; in October 1942 he remarried with Bianca Maria Valentini, who would give him two children (Paolo, born in 1943, and Roberto, born in 1946). Only after the defeat suffered in the nocturnal battle of Cape Matapan, in March 1941, the importance of his work was reevaluated, and he was summoned by the Italian Supreme Command and requested to build a functional radar as soon as possible. Less than a month later, on 20 April 1941, his prototype was tested and was revealed to be able to locate a ship from a distance of 12 kilometres, and an aircraft from 34 kilometres. Tiberio was then promoted to major for exceptional merits; his work led to the realization of two radar models, "Gufo" ("Owl", for naval use) and "Folaga" ("Coot", for coastal surveillance), of which 50 and 150 items, respectively, were ordered from the SAFAR and Marelli companies; only thirteen Gufos and four Folagas, however, were delivered before the Armistice of Cassibile. After the Armistice Tiberio, still serving at the Naval Academy (which had been relocated to Venice following the bombing of Livorno), sailed to Brindisi in Allied-controlled southern Italy along with the rest of the academy personnel and cadets. He was discharged from active service in September 1944.

After the war, Tiberio continued his research work in the field of applied electronics, telecommunications, electromagnetic propagation and bioengineering, publishing numerous essays and writings. In 1955 he was promoted to the rank of lieutenant colonel of the naval reserve in the Naval Weaponry Corps. He taught electrotechnics at the University of Cagliari from 1947, theory of electromagnetic waves at the University of Naples from 1953, and finally radio-frequency engineering at the University of Pisa from 1954 to 1979, when he retired. He died in Livorno in 1980.
