= Italian corvette Baionetta =

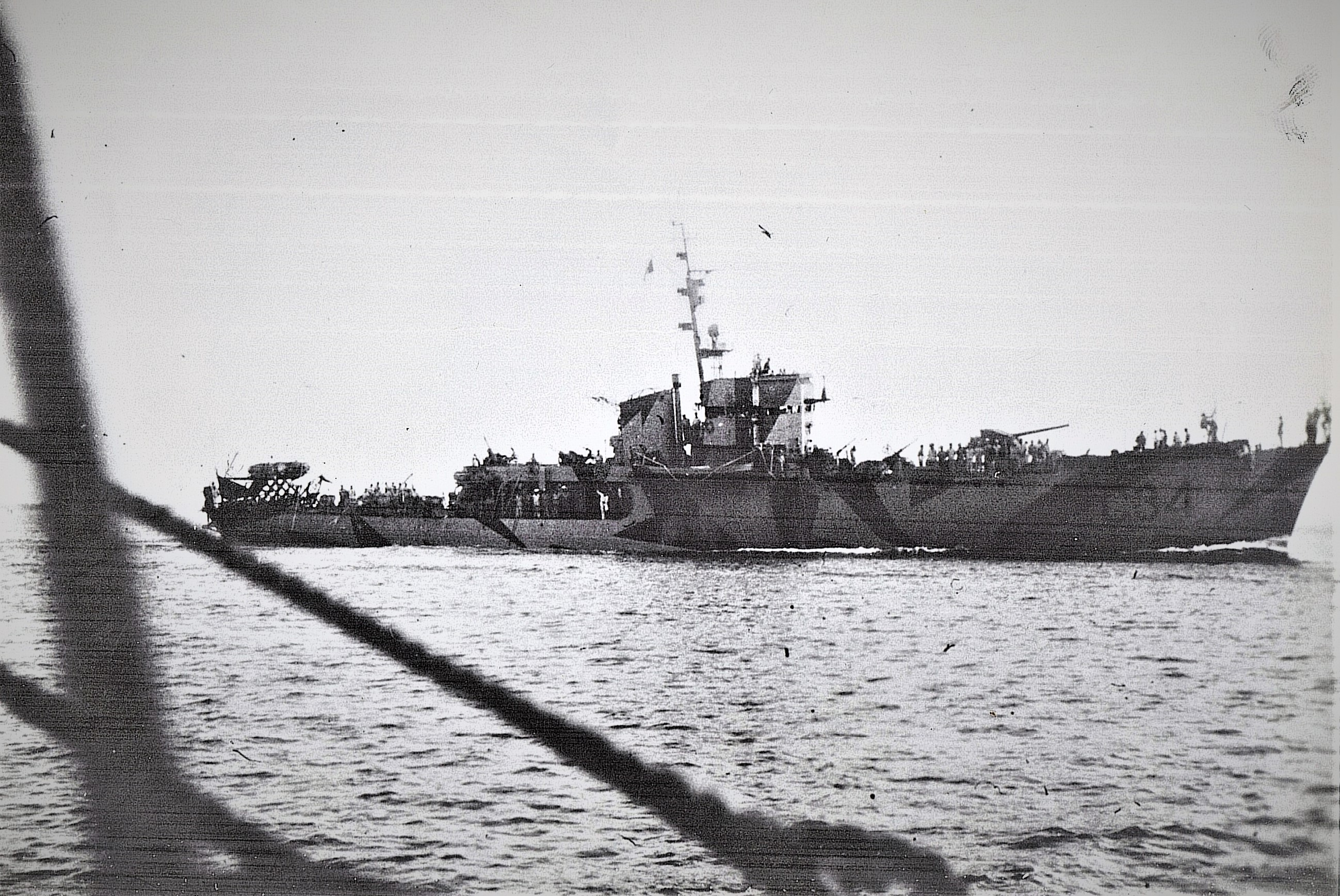
- Baionetta in September 1943

History

Italy
- Name: Baionetta
- Builder: Breda, Venezia, Italy
- Laid down: 24 February 1942
- Launched: 5 October 1942
- Commissioned: 15 May 1943
- Fate: Struck in January 1972

General characteristics
- Class & type: Gabbiano-class corvette
- Displacement: 660 long tons (670 t) standard; 728 long tons (740 t) full load
- Length: 58.8 m (192 ft 11 in)
- Beam: 8.71 m (28 ft 7 in)
- Draught: 2.53 m (8 ft 4 in)
- Propulsion: 2-shaft diesel; 3,500 bhp (2,600 kW)
- Speed: 18 knots (33 km/h; 21 mph)
- Range: 3,000 nmi (5,600 km; 3,500 mi) at 15 knots (28 km/h; 17 mph)
- Complement: 110
- Sensors & processing systems: Sonar and hydrophones
- Armament: 1 × 100 mm (4 in) / 47 caliber gun; 7 × 20 mm (0.79 in) anti-aircraft guns; 2 × 450 mm (18 in) torpedo tubes (added later); 10 × depth charge throwers

Baionetta was a Gabbiano-class corvette of the Regia Marina. She served in World War II from 1943 to 1945.

On 9 September 1943, a day after the Italian armistice, Baionetta transported King Victor Emmanuel III and General Pietro Badoglio, together with their respective entourages and general staff officers, from the small harbour town of Ortona and sailed south escorted by the Italian Capitani Romani-class light cruiser Scipione Africano, arriving in Brindisi the next day.
