= 3.7 cm Flak 18/36/37 =

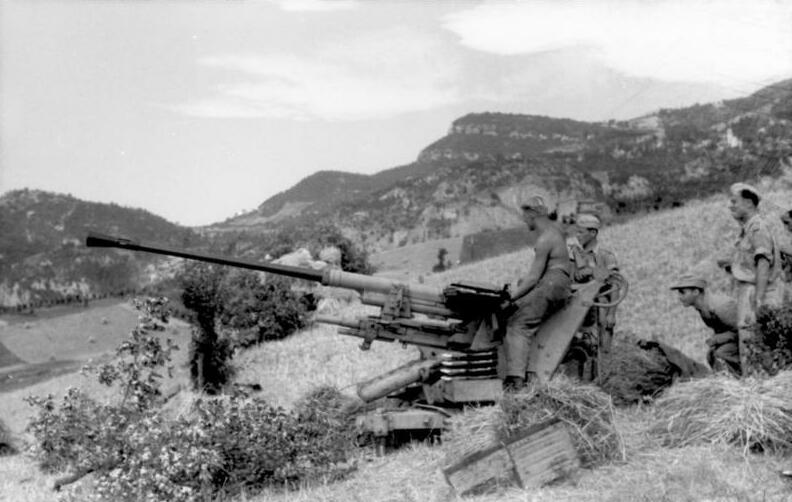
- A 3.7 cm Flak 36/37 in Italy, 1944
- Type: Anti-aircraft gun
- Place of origin: Nazi Germany

Service history
- In service: 1936–1945
- Used by: Nazi Germany, Romania, Bulgaria
- Wars: World War II

Production history
- Designer: Rheinmetall
- Produced: 1936–1945
- No. built: 20,243 (Germany); 360 (Romania)
- Variants: BK 37 aircraft gun

Specifications (3.7 cm Flak 36/37)
- Mass: 1,550 kg (3,420 lb) (combat) 1,250 kg (2,760 lb) (Flak 43)
- Barrel length: 2.11 m (83 in) (57 calibers)
- Crew: 6–7
- Shell: 37 × 263 mm B
- Shell weight: 623–659 g (1.373–1.453 lb)
- Caliber: 37 mm (1.5 in)
- Breech: gas-operated bolt
- Carriage: three-legged platform
- Elevation: -8° to +85°
- Traverse: 360°
- Rate of fire: 160 rpm (cyclic)
- Muzzle velocity: 770–840 m/s (2,500–2,800 ft/s)
- Effective firing range: 4,200 m (4,600 yd) (anti-aircraft)
- Maximum firing range: 7,995 m (8,743 yd) (ground range)
- Feed system: 6-round clips

The 3.7 cm Flak 18/36/37 was a series of anti-aircraft guns produced by Nazi Germany that saw widespread service in the Second World War. The cannon was fully automatic and effective against aircraft flying at altitudes up to 4,200 m. The cannon was produced in both towed and self-propelled versions. Having a flexible doctrine, the Germans used their anti-aircraft pieces in ground support roles as well; 37 mm caliber guns were no exception to that. With Germany's defeat, production ceased and, overall, 37 mm caliber anti-aircraft cannon fell into gradual disuse, being replaced by the Bofors 40 mm gun and later, by 35-mm anti-aircraft pieces produced in Switzerland.

== Development ==
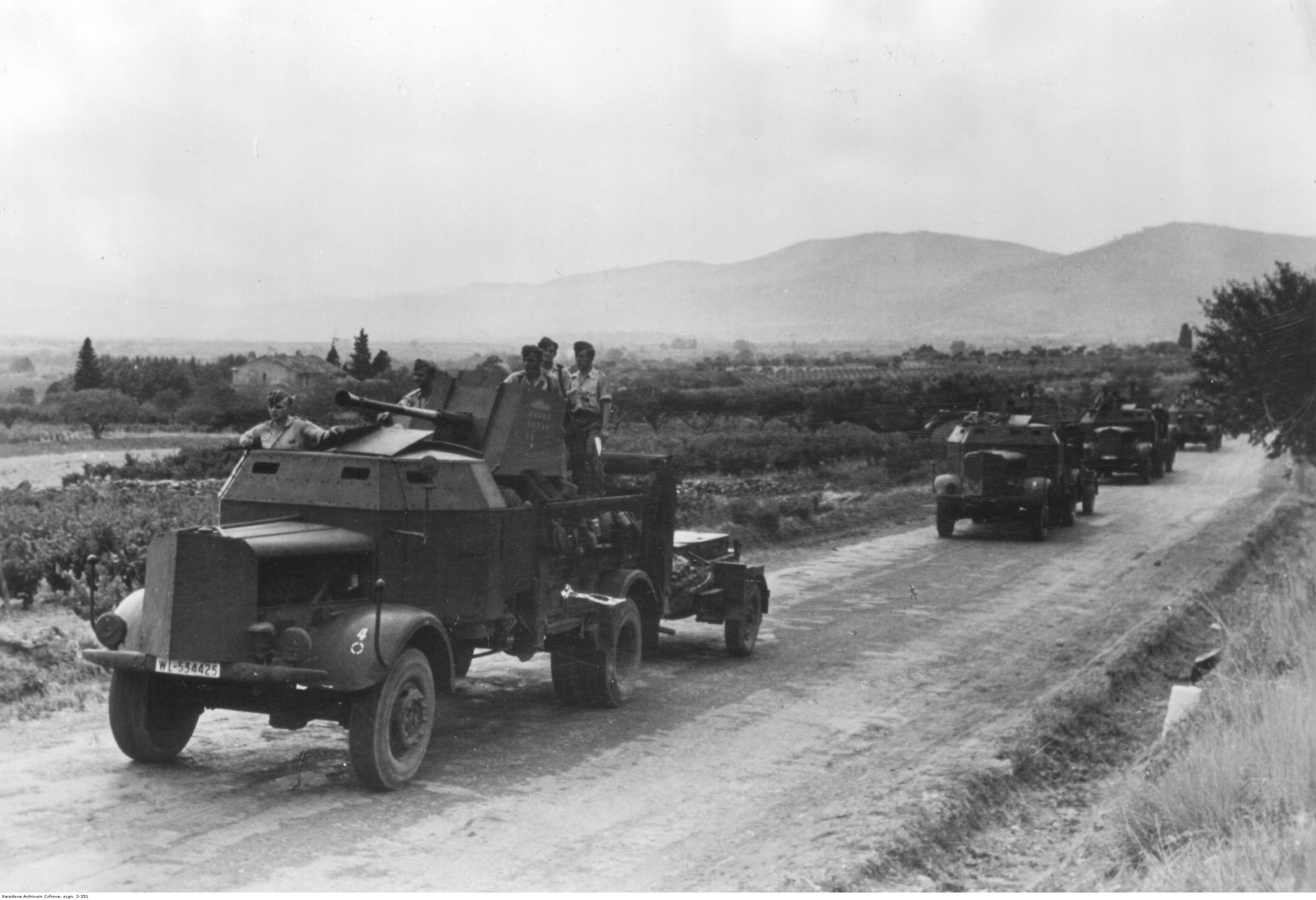
3.7 cm Flak 36 mounted on a German armoured truck in 1943

The original 37 mm gun was developed by Rheinmetall in 1935 as the 3.7 cm Flak 18. The cannon had an overall length of 89 calibers (hence the additional designation L/89), which allowed 4,800 m (15,700 ft) maximum ceiling. The armour penetration was considerable when using dedicated ammunition, at 100 m distance it could penetrate 36 mm of a 60°-sloped armour, and at 800 m distance correspondingly 24 mm. It used a mechanical bolt for automatic fire, featuring a practical rate of fire of about 80 rounds per minute (rpm). The gun, when emplaced for combat, weighed 1,750 kg (3,860 lb), and complete for transport, including the wheeled mount, 3,560 kg (7,850 lb).

The Flak 18 was only produced in small numbers, and production had already ended in 1936. Development continued, focusing on replacement of the existing cumbersome dual-axle mount with a lighter single-axle one, resulting in a 3.7 cm Flak 36 that cut the complete weight to 1,550 kg (3,420 lb) in combat and 2,400 kg (5,300 lb) in transport. The gun's ballistic characteristics were not changed, although the practical rate of fire was raised to 120 rpm (180 rpm theoretical). A new, simplified sighting system introduced the next year produced the otherwise-identical 3.7 cm Flak 37. The Flak 37 was known as 37 ITK 37 in Finland.

The Flak 36/37 were the most-produced variants of the weapon.

== Tun antiaerian Rheinmetall calibru 37 mm model 1939 ==
In 1938, the Kingdom of Romania acquired the license to locally produce 360 guns, officially known as "Tun antiaerian Rheinmetall calibru 37 mm model 1939" ("37 mm Rheinmetall anti-aircraft cannon model 1939") at the Astra Works in Brașov. By May 1941, 102 guns had been delivered. The production rate was of 6 pieces per month as of October 1942.

== Aviation version ==
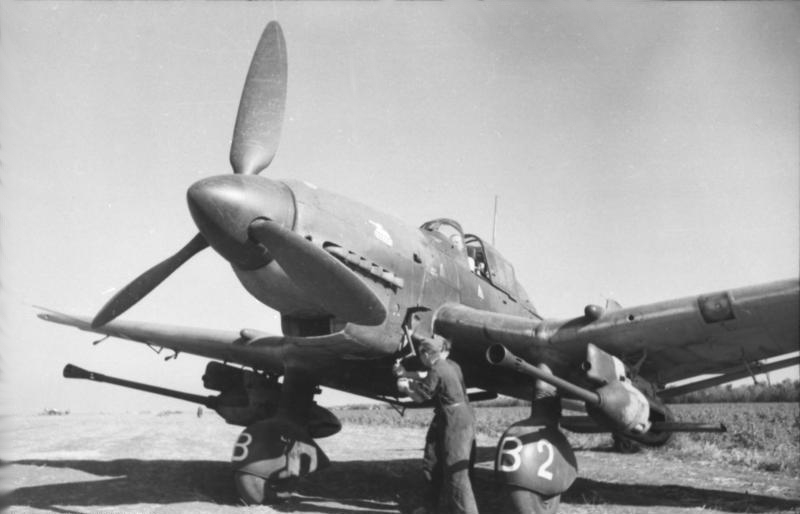
Ju 87G with twin BK 3,7 underwing gun pods

The earlier Flak 18 version of the 37mm autoloading gun was adapted for aviation use as the BK 3,7, the lightest-calibre model of the Bordkanone series of heavy caliber cannon used in Luftwaffe aircraft during the war. The BK 3,7 was usually employed for strike against ground targets, or for bomber destroyer duties. Mounted within self-contained gun pods or in conformal gondola-style flat-surface mounted gunpod housings, the BK 3,7 saw use on the Ju 87G panzerknacker ("tank-cracker") version of the Stuka dive bomber as flown with considerable success by Hans-Ulrich Rudel, the Ju 88P-2 and P-3 subtypes, and the Hs 129 B-2/R3 twin-engined strike aircraft.

== Similar weapons ==
The closest Allied counterpart to the 3.7 cm Flak series was the 40 mm Bofors L/60, which was designated the "4 cm Flak 28" in German service. The Bofors fired a larger shell of 900 g (32 oz), as opposed to around 650 g (23 oz), at a slightly higher muzzle velocity of around 880 m/s (2,900 ft/s) as opposed to just under 800 m/s (2,600 ft/s). This gave the Bofors an effective ceiling of about 4,900 m (16,100 ft) compared to 4,200 m (13,800 ft) for the Flak series. Firing rates for the earlier models were similar, although the Flak 43's improved rates beat the Bofors. The most notable difference is the size and weight of the two weapons; the Bofors weighed just under 2,000 kg (4,400 lb) and required a two-axle trailer, while the earlier Flak models weighed 1,550 kg (3,420 lb) on a single-axle mount, and the Flak 43 reduced this even further to 1,250 kg (2,760 lb).

The 37 mm automatic air defense gun M1939 (61-K) was the closest Soviet counterpart, firing a shell very similar to the Flak with a similar rate of fire from a gun of generally similar weight and size. The US's 37 mm Gun M1 was similar to the Flak as well, but was considered inferior to the Bofors and saw relatively limited use. The Japanese had nothing similar, their largest AA autocannon being the Type 96 25 mm AT/AA Gun. The Italian counterpart was the Breda Cannone-Mitragliera da 37/54.

== Comparison of anti-aircraft guns ==
Country	Gun Model	RPM	Projectile Weight	Weight of fire per minute
Nazi Germany	3.7 cm Flak 18/36/37	160	.64 kg (1.4 lb)	102.4 kg (226 lb)
Nazi Germany	3.7 cm SK C/30	30	.74 kg (1.6 lb)	22.2 kg (49 lb)
France	Canon de 37 mm Modèle 1925	15–21	.72 kg (1.6 lb)	10.8–15.12 kg (23.8–33.3 lb)
Italy	Cannone-Mitragliera da 37/54 (Breda)	60–120	.82 kg (1.8 lb)	49.2–98.4 kg (108–217 lb)
United States	37 mm Gun M1	120	.61 kg (1.3 lb)	73.2 kg (161 lb)
Soviet Union	37 mm automatic air defense gun M1939 (61-K)	160-170	.73 kg (1.6 lb)	116.8–124.1 kg (257–274 lb)
United Kingdom	QF 2-pounder naval gun	115	.91 kg (2.0 lb)	104.6 kg (231 lb)
Sweden	Bofors 40 mm gun	120	.9 kg (2.0 lb)	108 kg (238 lb)

== See also ==
- 3.7 cm Flak 43

== Sources ==
- Gander, Terry and Chamberlain, Peter. Weapons of the Third Reich: An Encyclopedic Survey of All Small Arms, Artillery and Special Weapons of the German Land Forces 1939-1945. New York: Doubleday, 1979 ISBN 0-385-15090-3
- Hogg, Ian. Twentieth-Century Artillery. New York: Barnes & Noble Books, 2000. ISBN 0-7607-1994-2 Pg.107
- Hogg, Ian V. German Artillery of World War Two. 2nd corrected edition. Mechanicsville, PA: Stackpole Books, 1997 ISBN 1-85367-480-X
