= 135 mm/45 Italian naval gun =

Cannone da 135/45 OTO 1937 and 1938, Ansaldo 1938
- Type: Naval gun
- Place of origin: Italy

Service history
- In service: 1940 - 1972
- Used by: Kingdom of Italy
- Wars: Second World War

Production history
- Designer: Odero Terni Orlando
- Manufacturer: Odero Terni Orlando; Ansaldo

Specifications
- Mass: 6.01 t (13,200 lb)
- Length: 6.075 m (19 ft 11.2 in)
- Shell weight: AP and HE: 32.7 kg (72 lb)
- Caliber: 135 mm (5.3 in)
- Elevation: -7° to +45°
- Rate of fire: 6-10 rounds per minute (Later: 20 rpm)
- Muzzle velocity: 825 metres per second (2,710 ft/s)
- Maximum firing range: 19,600 m (21,400 yd)

The Cannone da 135/45 OTO 1937 was a 135 mm (5.3 in) 45-caliber naval gun built for the Regia Marina in the late 1930s. Built as a response to the French Canon de 138 mm Modèle 1929, it was meant to have the same range as the widespread 120 mm gun, but with less muzzle velocity and less dispersion.

== Description ==
Developed by OTO, the gun construction was of loose barrel, jacket and bracket ring, with a horizontal, hand-operated sliding block. The guns were carried in single mounts, two-gun turrets, and three gun turrets. The original gun system utilized an impulse rammer (recoil-powered rammed) for shells, but the system struggled at elevations above 30°, limiting its utility as an anti-aircraft weapon.

=== Mountings ===
==== Modello OTO 1937 trinato ====
The OTO 1937 trinato was an electrically powered three-gun turret weighing 105.0 t (103.3 long tons) used exclusively on the Duilio-class battleships after their 1937-1940 reconstruction. Gun elevation ranged from -7° to a maximum of +45°, which allowed a maximum ballistic range of 19,600 m (21,400 yd). The guns were mounted in individual sleeves with a spacing of 74 cm (2.43 ft) between the axes, but could only be separately elevated by hand. Power elevation required them to be elevated together, though any gun could be cut out from power operation. The turret was armored and featured a 120 mm (4.7 in) faceplate and 100 mm (3.9 in) barbettes.

The magazines of the Duilio-class stored just under 148 shells per gun (1,773 total) with a corresponding number of cased cartridges. These would be manually placed in vertical drums to be raised to the main deck by an electric hoist, where they would be discharged onto horizontal automatic guide plates to separate them. The ammunition was then manhandled through a door into the lower barbette and fed to short electric hoists that would bring it up into the gun house. Shells and cartridges would be manually placed into the loading trays. The guns were designed to enable semi-automatic loading at any elevation angle, and were equipped with an impulse rammer to facilitate this. The impulse rammer operated off of the recoil forces generated when the gun was fired, using mechanical springs to automatically ram a shell when it was introduced into the loading tray. Cased cartridges were rammed manually. After the gun was fired, empty cases would be discharged and transported mechanically to ports in the turret face just below each barrel, and ejected. In practice, the impulse rammer was underpowered and could not effectively load shells beyond elevations of +30°.

The rate of fire of these mounts is most commonly reported as 6 rounds per minute per gun, but also as 6-7.5 rpm.

==== Modello OTO 1938 binato ====
The OTO 1938 binato was an electrically operated two-gun turret that weighed 42.0 t (41.3 long tons) and was installed on the Capitani Romani-class cruisers. The turret was also produced by Ansaldo as the Ansaldo 1938 binato. Gun elevation ranged from -5° to a maximum of +45°, and were mounted further apart with 140 cm (55 in) between the gun axes. The turret featured light splinter protection – a 20 mm (0.79 in) faceplate and 6 mm (0.24 in) on the sides, rear, and roof.

This turret used the same loading system within the gun house as the OTO 1937 trinato and thus suffered from the same problems with high-angle semi-automatic loading. The rest of the loading system differed substantially. On the Capitani Romani-class, each turret had its own magazine storing 320 shells and 65 star shells. Each magazine had two hoists with continuous belts to transfer ammunition to the handling chambers, where they could be transferred to a pair of angled hoists that would bring the ammunition into the gun house. These hoists rotated with the turret, and each hoist cage could accommodate three shells and three charges with a delivery rate of twelve elevations per minute under power, or six per minute when manually operated.

The OTO 1938 binato had a rate of fire of 10 rounds per minute per gun. However, 6-7 rpm was more typically achieved.

In 1938, the Regia Marina developed a project to convert the Di Giussano-class light cruisers into anti-aircraft escort cruisers. The initial plans for the project called for the ships to have their armament (4xII 152/53 Ansaldo 1926) replaced by sixteen Ansaldo 90mm/50 anti-aircraft guns in single mounts, but were later revised down to twelve 90mm guns to allow the addition of four 135/45 in two OTO 1938 binato turrets. These were intended to allow the ship to defend itself from surface targets. The project was never executed. A modified version of the mount more suitable for anti-aircraft work was planned for the Etna-class light cruisers, which would have carried three turrets, but this project was far from complete by the time of the Italian armistice.

==== Modified OTO 1933 binato ====
These mounts were originally OTO 1933 two-gun turrets for the 120/50 naval gun. During the effort to refurbish the battleship Conte di Cavour from the damage she sustained at the raid on Taranto, the Regia Marina decided to modify the turret to accept two 135/45 in a common cradle. The turret structures, removed during her recovery, were re-installed by August 1942, and the 135mm guns fitted by November 1942. The fire control directors were installed in February 1943, and the gun systems went through 'dry' testing, absent live fire. However, the electrical network for the fire control system was not completed before all work on the ship was suspended in June 1943.

==== Impianti OTO/Ansaldo singolo ====
A variety of single mount designs exist for the 135/45 with no official designation. These were single-purpose pedestal mounts with elevation up to +45° and a simple gun shield. The Regia Marina planned to fit these guns on the new Comandanti-class destroyers (4-5), the converted aircraft carrier Aquila (8), and the destroyer Premuda – the ex-Dubrovnik, captured from Yugoslavia (4). The Regia Marina also planned to complete another Yugoslav destroyer, Spalato (ex-Split), with the same guns (5) – the latter ship having been captured while she was under construction. The mount was also used for coastal defense positions.

==== Modello Nuova San Giorgio binato ====
This mount, designed by Nuova San Giorgio S.p.A. in 1955, was used to replace the forward 152mm battery of the light cruiser Giuseppe Garibaldi during her conversion into a guided missile cruiser from 1957 to 1961. This reused existing 135/45 barrels with a new automatic loading system in a dual-purpose turret. The new loading system doubled the rate of fire to 20 rounds per minute per gun, and the gun system as a whole was credited with an effective anti-aircraft range of 12,000 to 13,000 meters. The magazines for turret no.1 stored 500 rounds while turret no.2 had 700 rounds in its magazine.

In 1968, the gun system was further modified to accept a prototype 135mm/53 gun system, ultimately intended for the Audace-class guided missile destroyers. This gun system fired a heavier 33.55 kg (74.0 lb) shell at a higher muzzle velocity of 870 m/s (2,900 ft/s), increasing the maximum ballistic range to 22,000 m (24,000 yd). At the maximum elevation of +85°, ceiling for anti-aircraft fire was 14,500 m (47,600 ft).

=== Ammunition ===
The 135/45 used two types of shell – Granata Dirompente (High Explosive) and Granta Perfornate. Granata Perforante could describe a variety of shell types with armor penetration capabilities, though in this case they referred to a semi-armor piercing type with a non-delay base fuse. The high explosive shells, normally fit with O.Bo. (Ogiva-Borletti) instant nose fuses, could be fitted with OMTP (Ogiva Meccanici a Tempo e a Percussione) time fuses for use as anti-aircraft shells.

The illumination shells were of the ‘long range’ type (Proietto illuminante grande gittata), which had a maximum range of 10,200 m (11,200 yd).

The high explosive and semi-armor piercing shells used a standard 8.875 kg (19.57 lb) flashless NAC charge for 1st charge, in brass cartridge cases that weighed 21.085 kg (46.48 lb) when filled. Illumination shells used a smaller Powder C charge with a total cartridge mass of 15.875 kg (35.00 lb).

135/45 Ammunition
Shell Type	Length	Mass	Filler Mass	Muzzle Velocity	Maximum Range
Semi-Armor Piercing	54.0 cm (21.3 in)	32.73 kg (72.2 lb)	1.465 kg (3.23 lb)	825 m/s (2,710 ft/s)	19,600 m (21,400 yd)
High Explosive		32.42 kg (71.5 lb)	1.800 kg (3.97 lb)	825 m/s (2,710 ft/s)	19,600 m (21,400 yd)
Illumination (Long Range)		31.15 kg (68.7 lb)			10,200 m (11,200 yd)

== Service ==
The 135/45 saw limited service during the Second World War as it was installed on relatively few ships; the two Duilio-class battleships completed their reconstructions in 1940, while of the Capitani Romani, only one ship entered service in 1942 and two more in 1943. Installations on other ships were not completed before the Italian armistice.

Despite this, the 135mm had a favorable reputation as a reliable and accurate gun system, having only a quarter of the dispersion of the preceding 120/50 naval guns. In the anti-surface role, it was used to good effect on at least two occasions. On the night of 17–18 July 1943, the cruiser Sicipone Africanco successfully forced the Strait of Messina during Operation Scylla, sinking one British motor torpedo boat and damaging two more. During the events of the Italian armistice, the incomplete cruiser Giulio Germanico was 94% complete at the Royal Shipyard of Castellammare di Stabia and already had her armament fitted. When German forces attempted to size the yard, her captain, Lt. Cmdr. Domenico Baffigo, took command of the defense of the yard and successfully repulsed the German attack with an ad hoc force of Carabinieri, yard workers, and sailors of the Regia Marina. The supporting fire of Giulio Germanico's guns was decisive in repulsing the attack. On the third day, the cruiser and other ships ran out of ammunition, and the Germans agreed to a parley. The parley was a trap, and Baffigo and several officers were taken prison, brought to Naples, and executed.

With the maximum elevation of the gun system limited to +45°, and the limit for semi-automatic ramming being at 30°, its effectiveness as an anti-aircraft weapon was limited. However, like the Italian 120mm and 152mm guns, the high-explosive shells could be fitted with time fuses for anti-aircraft, and ships normally carried some reserve of this ammunition. These were used to fire 'barrages' in the flight path of attacking aircraft, breaking up low-level attacks from torpedo bombers or mast-height bombers.

After the Second World War, the 135/45 remained in service with the Regia Marina, and then Marina Militare, on the Duilio-class until the last ship was definitively stricken in 1956. The Capitani Romani had been divided between the Marina Militare and Marine Nationale in 1948, and both navies had opted to radically rebuild the ships into destroyer leaders in the early 1950s. These reconstructions removed the guns in favor of dual-purpose gun systems, with the Marina Militare opting for the American 5-inch/38 Mk.12, and the Marine Nationale favoring the German 10.5cm SK C/33.

The gun did not return to service until 1961, when the cruiser Giuseppe Garibaldi completed her conversion into a guided missile cruiser and recommissioned into the Marina Militare. Her 135/45 were replaced by the 135/53 in 1968, and she would continue to serve until 1971.

== See also ==
=== Weapons of comparable role, performance and era ===
- Canon de 138 mm Modèle 1929

== Bibliography ==
- Ando, Elio (1978). "Capitani Romani Part 1: Design and Construction". Warship. II (7): 146–157.
- Ando, Elio (1978). "Capitani Romani Part 2: Operational History". Warship. II (8): 246–257.
- Bagnasco, Erminio (1978). Le armi delle navi italiane nella Seconda Guerra Mondiale. Parma: Ermanno Albertelli Editore. ISBN 8887372403.
- Bagnasco, Erminio; Brescia, Maurizio; de Toro, Augusto (2022). Storia Militare Briefing n.33: Incrociatori leggeri classe "Capitani Romani". Parma: Editore Storia Militare S.r.l. ISSN 2532-0963.
- Bagnasco, Erminio; de Toro, Augusto (2021). Italian Battleships: Conte di Cavour and Duilio-class 1911-1956. Barnsley: Seaforth Publishing. ISBN 978-1-5267-9987-6.
- Campbell, John (1985). Naval Weapons of World War Two. Annapolis, Maryland: Naval Institute Press. ISBN 0-87021-459-4.
- Cosentino, Michele; de Toro, Augusto (2023). Storia Militare Briefing n.39: Incrociatori leggeri classi "Di Giussano" e "Cadorna". Parma: Edizioni Storia Militare S.r.l. ISSN 2532-0963.
- Cosentino, Michele; de Toro, Augusto (2024). Storia Militare n.45: Incrociatori leggeri classe "Duca degli Abruzzi". Parma: Edizioni Storia Militare S.r.l. ISSN 2532-0963.
- Giorgerini, Giorgio; Nani, Augusto (1966). Le Navi di Linea Italiane (2a ed.). Roma: Ufficio Storico della Marina Militare.
- Giorgerini, Giorgio; Nani, Augusto (1971). Gli Incrociatori Italiani 1861-1970 (3a ed.). Roma: Ufficio Storico della Marina Militare.
- O'Hara, Vincent P.; Cernuschi, Enrico (2020). Dark Navy: the Regia Marina and the Armistice of 8 September 1943. Nimble Books LLC. ISBN 978-1-6088-8077-5.
- Pignato, Nicola; Cappellano, Filippo; Rastelli, Achille (2005). OTO MELARA 1905 - 2005: Una grande tradizione verso il futuro. Fidenza. ISBN 88-89397-24-1.
- Pretty, R.T.; Archer, D. H. R., eds. (1972). Jane's Weapon Systems 1972-73 (4th ed.). London: Sampson Low Marston & Co. ISBN 0-354-00105-1.
- Rizza, Claudio (2021). "Il Combattimento Notturno e la Regia Marina". Storia Miltiare (330): 4–11. ISSN 1122-5289.
