= San Giorgio-class destroyer =

Destroyers of the Italian Navy

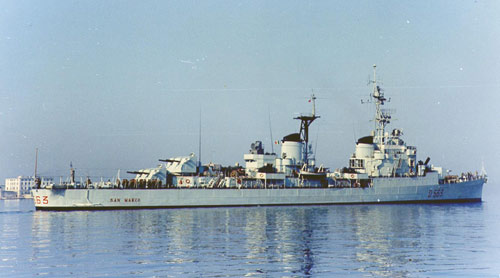
- San Marco

Class overview
- Name: San Giorgio class
- Builders: Cantieri Navali del Tirreno Riuniti; Regio Cantiere di Castellammare di Stabia
- Operators: Italian Navy
- Preceded by: Soldati class
- Succeeded by: Impetuoso class
- Subclasses: Capitani Romani class
- Built: 1939–1941
- In commission: 1955–1980
- Planned: 2
- Completed: 2
- Retired: 2

General characteristics
- Type: Destroyer
- Displacement: 4,850 long tons (4,928 t) standard; 5,600 long tons (5,690 t) full load
- Length: 142.2 m (466 ft 6 in)
- Beam: 14.4 m (47 ft 3 in)
- Draft: 5.1 m (16 ft 9 in)
- Propulsion: 4 × Thornycroft boilerss, 110,000 shp (82 MW); 2 × screws
- Speed: 39 knots (72 km/h; 45 mph)
- Range: 4,060 nmi (7,520 km; 4,670 mi) at 16 kn (30 km/h; 18 mph)
- Complement: 314
- Sensors & processing systems: 1 × AN/SPS-6 air-search radar; 1 × SG-6B surface-search radar; 1 × SP radar; 1 × AN/SQS-11 sonar; 1 × Mark 37 director
- Armament: 3 × twin 5-inch/38 cal. guns; 1 × Menon ASW mortar; 4 × quad 40 mm Bofors guns; 2 × twin 40 mm Bofors guns; 2 × depth charge tracks

The San Giorgio class was a class of two destroyers of the Italian Navy. They entered service in 1955, with the last one being decommissioned in 1980. Formerly Capitani Romani-class cruisers of the Regia Marina (Royal Italian Navy) during World War II, they were rebuilt as destroyers during the Cold War. San Giorgio (ex Pompeo Magno) was the first to enter service in 1955 and was modified again from 1963 to 1965 to become a training ship until 1980. San Marco (ex Giulio Germanico) was scuttled by the Germans after the incomplete ship fell into German hands following the Italian Armistice. Following the war, the vessel was raised, rebuilt and renamed and entered service in 1956. San Marco served until 1971.

== Design ==
For the two units the main reconstruction works concerned the armament. The eight 135-millimetre (5.3 in)/45 calibre guns, capable of delivering very precise shots, but lacking satisfactory anti-aircraft capability, were removed and replaced with six less powerful US 5 in (127 mm)/38 cal guns but with the fundamental ability to perform effective anti-aircraft fire. The guns were configured in three twin turrets, one forward and two aft. In place of the second twin forward turret, a Menon anti-submarine warfare (ASW) mortar was installed.

The anti-aircraft armament was also reconfigured with the removal of the eight 37 mm (1.5 in)/5 cal guns replaced by four 40 mm (1.6 in) Bofors guns in quad variant and two in twin variant systems. The guns were controlled by a US Mark 37 director with Mark 25 radar on top. Other electronic devices were the AN/SPS-6 air-search radar, the SG-6B surface-search radar and an SQS-11 sonar. The ASW armament was complemented by four side anti-submarine mortars and two depth charge tracks.

== Ships in the class ==
| Pennant | Name | Builders | Laid down | Launched | Commissioned/Recommissioned | Decommissioned |
|---|---|---|---|---|---|---|
| D 562 | San Giorgio | Cantieri Navali del Tirreno Riuniti, Ancona | 3 September 1939 | 24 August 1941 | 24 June 1943 | 1 May 1948 |
| D 562 | San Giorgio | Cantieri Navali del Tirreno Riuniti, Ancona | 3 September 1939 | 24 August 1941 | 1955 | 1980 |
| D 563 | San Marco | Regio Cantiere di Castellammare di Stabia | 3 April 1939 | 26 July 1941 | 1955 | 1971 |

== History ==
After the World War II, given the changing needs of the Navy in the Mediterranean, it was decided to transform the two ships into destroyers. For the former Pompeo Magno (San Giorgio) and for the former Giulio Germanico (San Marco) the work took place from 1953 to 1955 respectively at the Cantieri del Tirreno in Genoa and the Navalmeccanica in Castellammare di Stabia.

=== San Giorgio ===
San Giorgio entered service in the Regia Marina (Royal Italian Navy) with the name Pompeo Magno in 1943 shortly before the armistice. After removal from the Navy list it was marked by the designation FV 1. In 1950 it was chosen for reconstruction as a destroyer and renamed San Giorgio. Once the work was completed, the ship entered service in the Italian Navy on 1 July 1955 with the pennant number D 562.

From 1963 and until 1965, San Giorgio was again subjected to modification works at the Arsenal of La Spezia to be transformed into a training ship for the students of the Naval Academy of Livorno, carrying out this task until it was disarmed in 1980.

=== San Marco ===
San Marco was built with the name Giulio Germanico in the Royal Shipyard of Castellammare di Stabia. Laid down in 1939 and launched in 1941, the cruiser was completing the set-up when the armistice of 8 September was signed. Falling into the hands of the Germans who had taken control of the shipyard, the ship was scuttled when the following 28 September the German occupation troops left the city.

After the war the hull of Giulio Germanico was recovered in the port of Castellammare and marked the designation FV 2. Given the good overall condition of the hull in 1950 it was decided to rebuild the ship as a destroyer and renamed San Marco. Once the work was completed, the ship entered service in the Italian Navy on 1 January 1956 with the pennant number D 563, serving until 1971 when it was disarmamed.

== Gallery ==
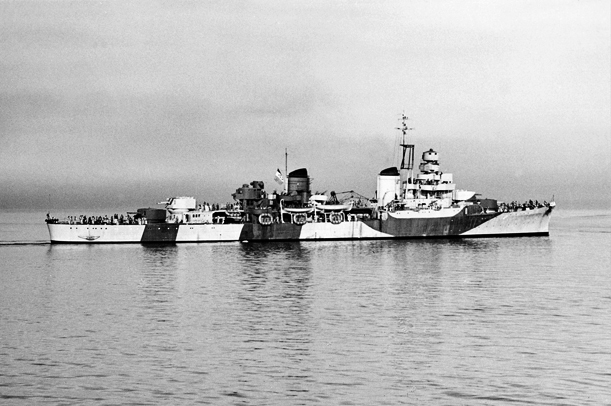
Pompeo Magno

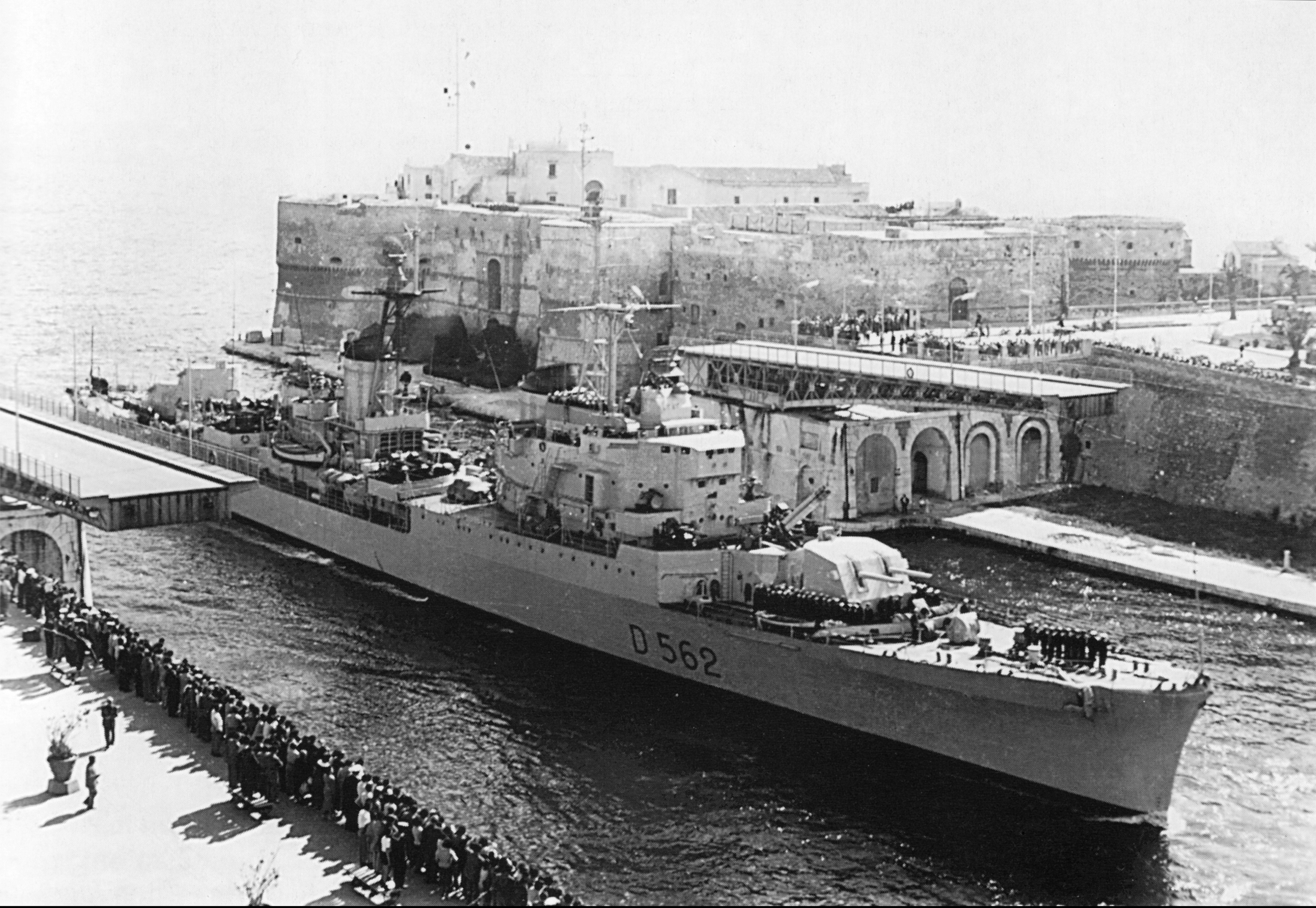
San Giorgio

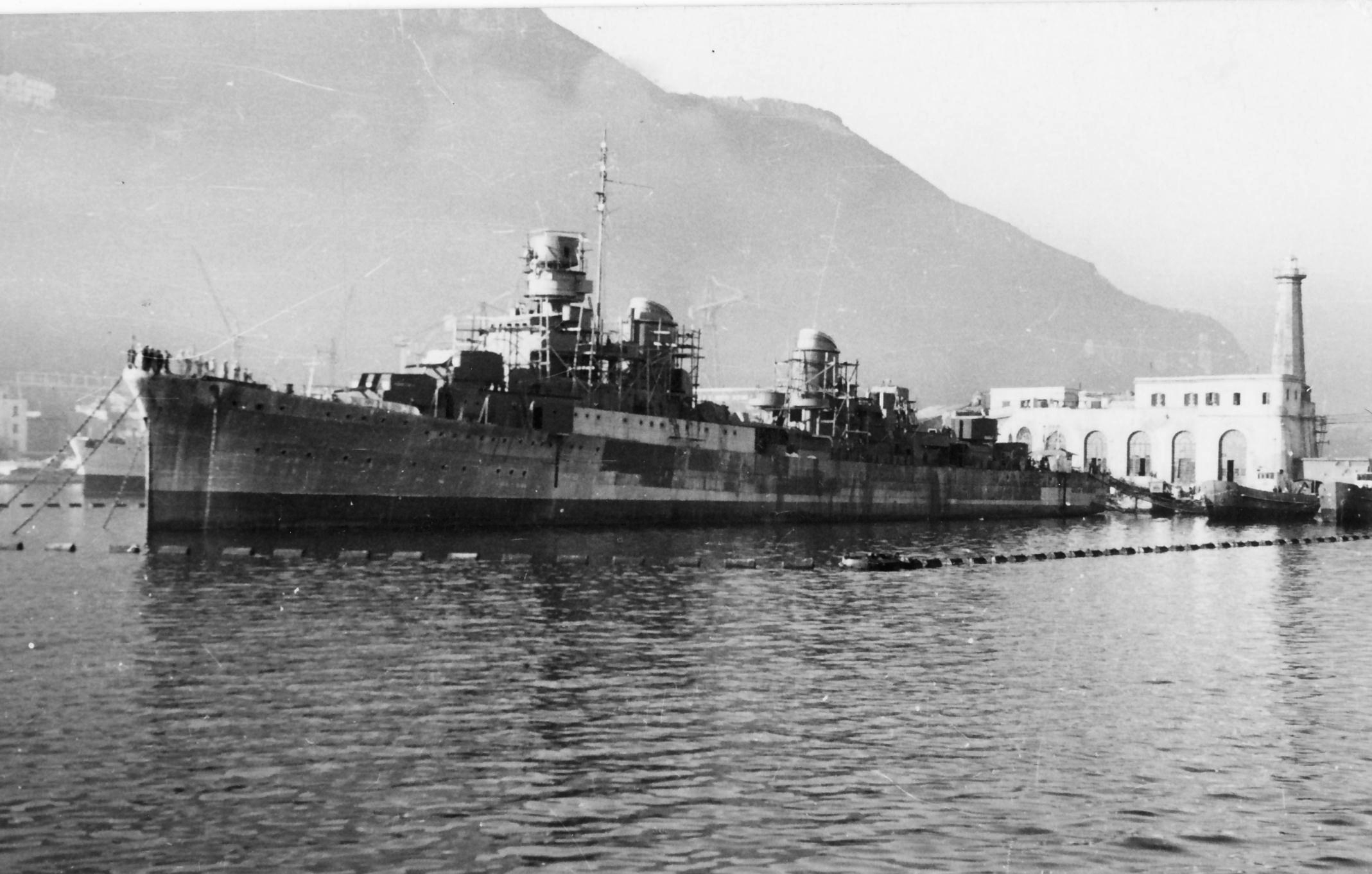
Giulio Germanico

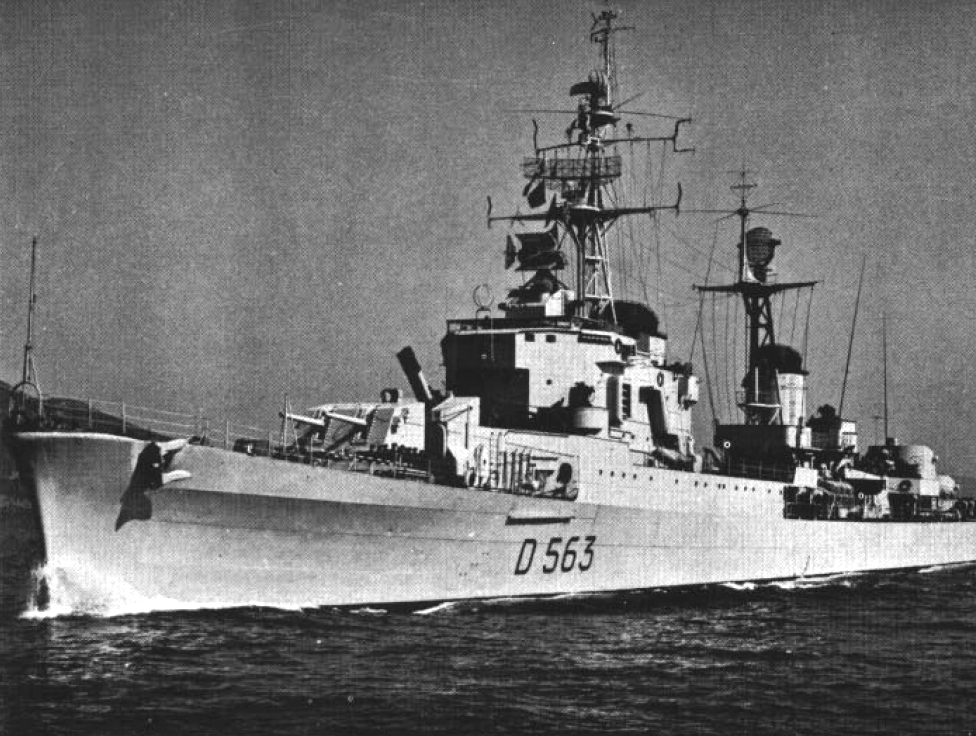
San Marco
