= 10.5 cm Flak 38 =

German anti-aircraft gun

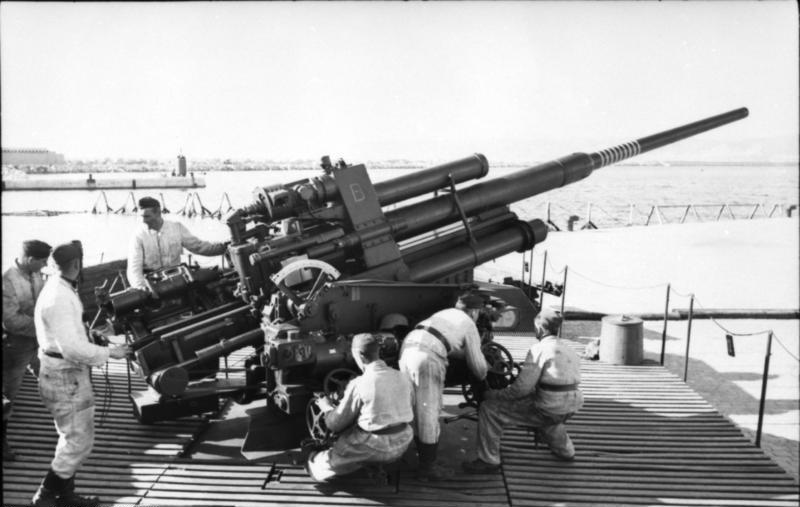
- A Flak 38 105 mm anti-aircraft gun at a coastal battery, 1942
- Type: Anti-aircraft gun
- Place of origin: Nazi Germany

Service history
- In service: 1937–62
- Used by: Nazi Germany (1937-45), French Navy (1953-62)
- Wars: World War II

Production history
- Designer: Rheinmetall
- Designed: 1933
- Manufacturer: Rheinmetall
- Produced: 1936–45
- No. built: Approx 4,200

Specifications (Flak 39)
- Mass: 10,224 kg (22,540 lbs)
- Length: 6.648 m (21 ft 10 in)
- Barrel length: 5.547 m (18 ft 2 in) L/52.8
- Width: 2.4 m (7 ft 10 in)
- Height: 2.9 m (9 ft 6 in)
- Crew: 10
- Shell: 105 × 769 mm. R
- Shell weight: 15.1 kg (33 lb 5 oz)
- Caliber: 105 mm (4.13 in)
- Barrels: One, 36 grooves with right-hand increasing twist from 1/48 to 1/36
- Breech: Horizontal semi-automatic sliding-block
- Recoil: Hydro-pneumatic
- Elevation: -3° to +85°
- Traverse: 360°
- Rate of fire: 15–18 rounds per minute
- Muzzle velocity: 881 m/s (2,890 ft/s)
- Effective firing range: 17,600 m (19,247 yds) ground target 9,450 m (31,003 ft) effective ceiling
- Maximum firing range: 11,400 m (37,401 ft) maximum ceiling

The 10.5 cm Flak 38 was a German anti-aircraft gun used during World War II by the Luftwaffe. An improved version was introduced as the 10.5 cm Flak 39.

== Development ==
=== Land version ===
The Flak 38 was introduced as a competitor to the 8.8 cm Flak 18. In this role it proved to be too heavy for field use while having roughly similar performance as the 88 mm, therefore it was used primarily in static mounts.

The Flak 39 was an improved version, which replaced the electrical gun laying system with a mechanical one.

=== Naval version ===
The 10.5 cm SK C/33 (Note: SK - Schnelladekanone (quick loading cannon); C - Construktionsjahr (year of design)) was used by the Kriegsmarine, the German Navy. Related to the Flak 38, it was installed on the Bismarck and Scharnhorst classes of battleships as well as the Deutschland- and Admiral Hipper-class cruisers. After the war, it was used for a few years by the French Marine Nationale on the reconstructed ex-Italian light cruisers, Châteaurenault and Guichen. In the late 1940s, the French also planned to equip the battleship Richelieu with twelve of these mountings, but the project was cancelled due to credit shortage.

They were mounted in pairs on an electrically powered tri-axial mounting, intended to compensate for the motion of the ship and maintain a lock onto the intended target. The mounting was not properly waterproofed and as the mountings were open to the weather and sea swell, this resulted in a high maintenance burden.

== Gallery ==
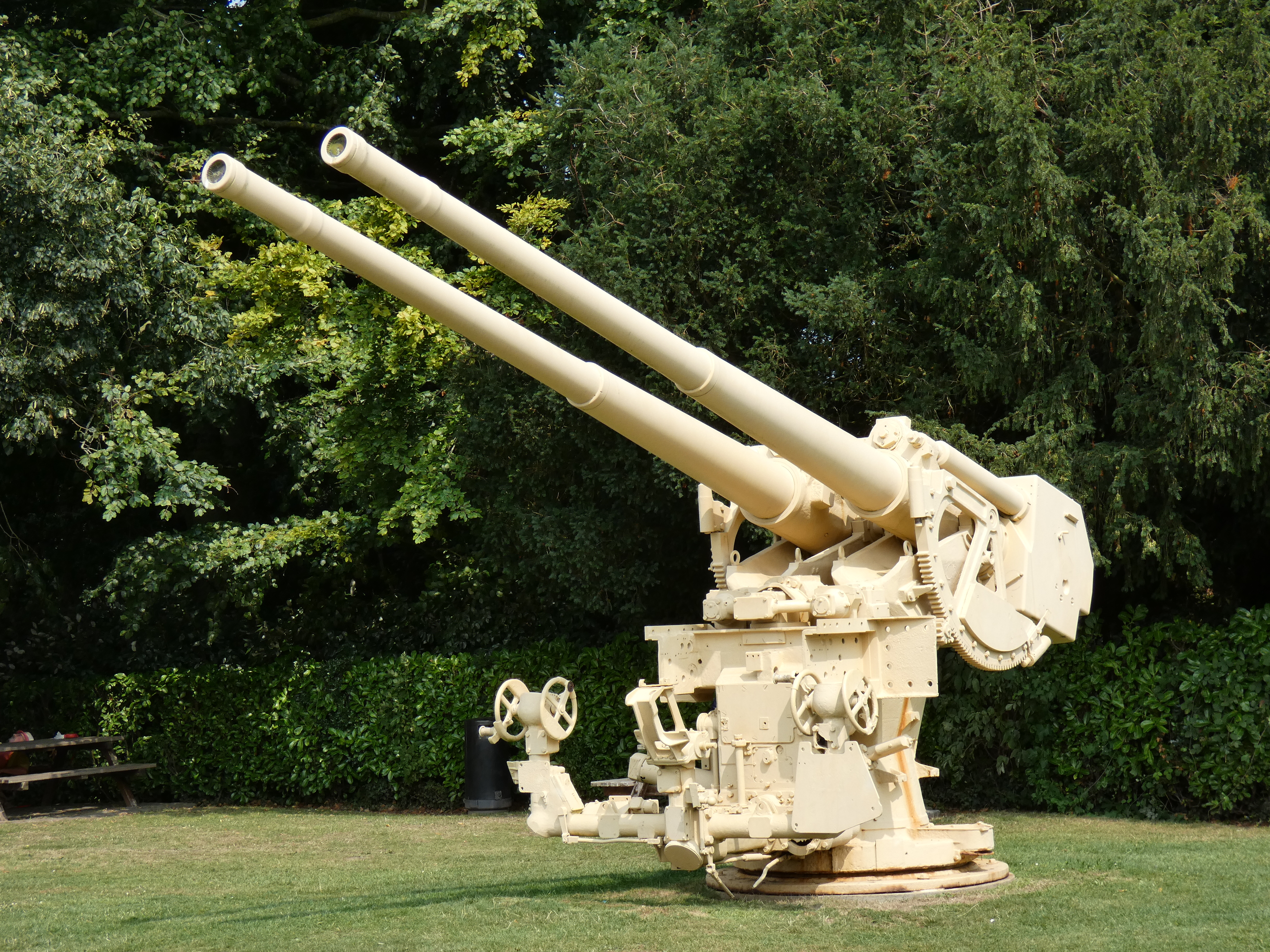
A twin mounting without its protective shield, exposing the positions of the three aimers for the rotation, elevation and canting axis.

"Flak" (1944) de-classified official U.S. War-Department training film reel.

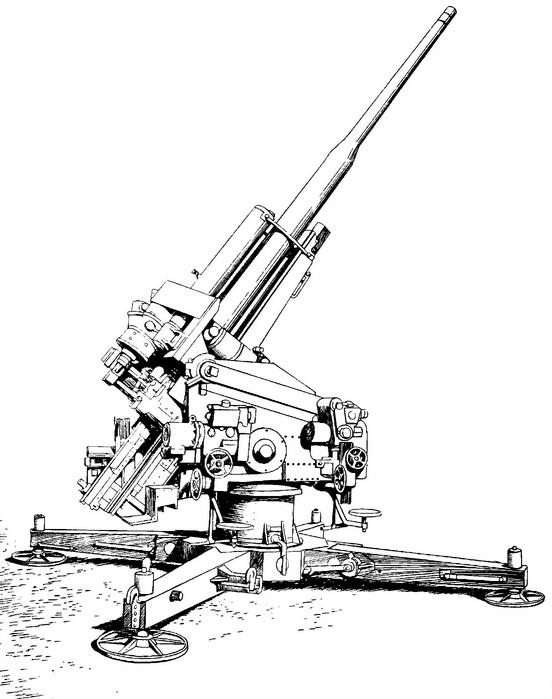

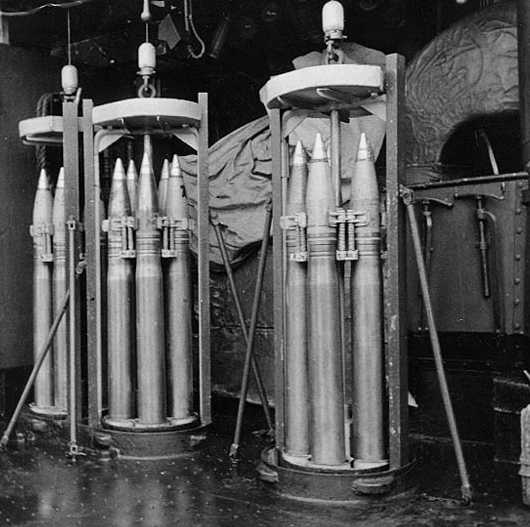
10.5cm German anti-aircraft munition

== Bibliography ==
- Gander, Terry; Chamberlain, Peter (1979). Weapons of the Third Reich: An Encyclopedic Survey of All Small Arms, Artillery and Special Weapons of the German Land Forces 1939–1945. New York: Doubleday. ISBN 0-385-15090-3.
- Hogg, Ian V. (1997). German Artillery of World War Two (2nd corrected ed.). Mechanicsville, PA: Stackpole Books. ISBN 1-85367-480-X.
