= Nello Carrara =

Italian physicist (1900–1993)

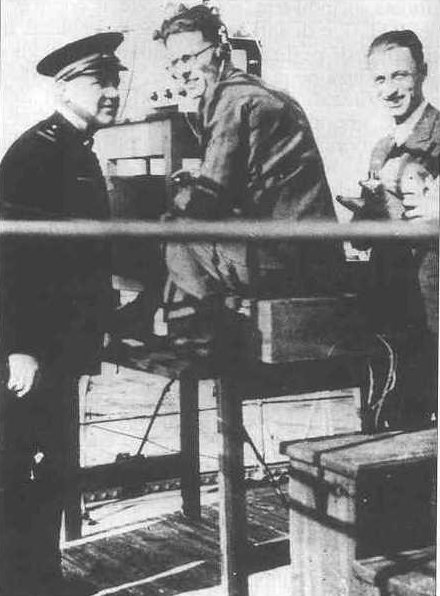
- Nello Carrara (center) with his experimental E.C.1 radar in 1935
- Born: 19 February 1900; Florence, Italy
- Died: 5 June 1993 (aged 93); Florence, Italy
- Citizenship: Italy
- Education: Scuola Normale Superiore
- Known for: Radar
- Awards: Grand Officer of the Order of Merit of the Italian Republic; Knight of the Order of Saints Maurice and Lazarus.
- Scientific career
- Fields: Physics
- Workplaces: Scuola Normale Superiore di Pisa; Italian Naval Academy; University of Florence
- Doctoral advisor: Luigi Puccianti

Nello Carrara (19 February 1900 – 5 June 1993) was an Italian physicist and founder of the Electromagnetic Wave Research Institute. He researched X-rays and was a pioneer of radar, but is best known for coining the term "microwave".

== Biography ==
Nello Carrara was born in Florence on 19 February 1900. He graduated from high school in 1917, and after serving in the Army during World War I, entered the Scuola Normale Superiore in Pisa in 1918, where he studied physics. His fellow students included Enrico Fermi and Franco Rasetti. He wrote his doctoral thesis on X-ray diffraction in 1921. After graduation, he worked for the University of Pisa. At the age of 24, he became a professor at the Italian Naval Academy, where he taught hundreds of Italian Marina Militare officers and academic researchers until 1954. While there he was involved with the development of radar, helping to create the first Italian RDT (Radio Detector Rangefinder), the continuous wave EC1 in 1936. He also taught physics at the University of Bari from 1945 to 1946, and the University of Pisa from 1947 to 1950. Carrara founded the Electromagnetic Wave Research Institute in Florence in 1946. He became Professor of Naval Electromagnetic Waves at the Higher Institute of Naples in 1954, and moved to the University of Florence in 1956. In 1975 he became a professor emeritus. He was also Director of the Center of Microwave National Research Council.

As a researcher, he published over 100 works. In his paper on "The Detection of Microwaves" in 1932, he coined the common term "microwave".

He was a consultant in various industries and co-founder and later president of SMA-Segnalamento Marittimo ed Aereo, which manufactured naval, aerial and terrestrial radar equipment. He was also president of Selesmar, which specialised in commercial navigation radar and vice president of ISC, which provided space communications equipment.

He received numerous awards, including being made a Grand Officer of the Order of Merit of the Italian Republic and a knight of the Order of Saints Maurice and Lazarus. The IFAC Research Institute (Istituto di Fisica Applicata "Nello Carrara") in Florence is named after him.

== See also ==
- Gufo radar
