= Italian cruiser Scipione Africano =

Decommissioned light cruiser (warship)

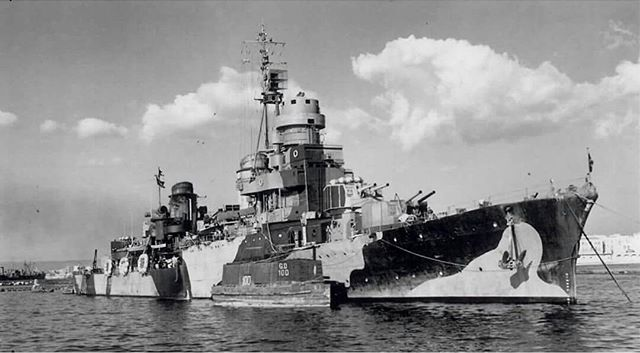
- Scipione Africano surrendering at Malta on 9 September 1943

History

Italy
- Name: Scipione Africano
- Namesake: Scipio Africanus
- Ordered: 1937
- Builder: O.T.O., Livorno
- Laid down: 28 September 1939
- Launched: 12 January 1941
- Commissioned: 23 April 1943
- Decommissioned: 8 August 1948
- Fate: Ceded to France as war reparations, 1948

France
- Name: Guichen
- Namesake: Luc Urbain de Bouëxic, comte de Guichen
- Acquired: 15 August 1948
- Commissioned: August 1948
- Decommissioned: 1961
- Stricken: 1 June 1976
- Fate: Scrapped, 1982

General characteristics
- Class & type: Capitani Romani-class cruiser
- Displacement: 3,750 long tons (3,810 t) standard; 5,420 long tons (5,510 t) full load
- Length: 142.2 m (466 ft 6 in) overall
- Beam: 14.4 m (47 ft 3 in)
- Draught: 4.1 m (13 ft 5 in)
- Propulsion: 2 shaft geared turbines; 4 boilers; 110,000 hp (82,000 kW)
- Speed: 41 knots (76 km/h; 47 mph)
- Range: 4,350 nmi (8,060 km; 5,010 mi) at 18 knots (33 km/h; 21 mph)
- Complement: 418
- Sensors & processing systems: EC-3/ter Gufo radar
- Armament: 4 × twin 135 mm (5.3 in) guns; 8 × single 37 mm (1.5 in) guns; 4 × twin 20 mm (0.79 in) guns; 2 × quadruple 533 mm (21 in) torpedo tubes; 70 × mines
- Armour: Turrets: 6–20 mm (0.24–0.79 in); Conning tower: 15 mm (0.59 in)

Scipione Africano was an Italian Capitani Romani-class light cruiser, which served in the Regia Marina during World War II. As she commissioned in the spring of 1943, the majority of her service took place on the side of the Allies - 146 wartime missions after the Armistice of Cassibile versus 15 before. She remained commissioned in the Italian navy after the war, until allocated to France as war reparations by the Paris Peace Treaties of 1947. Scipione Africano was decommissioned from the Marina Militare in August 1948 and subsequently commissioned into the Marine Nationale as Guichen, after briefly being known as S.7.

Scipione Africano was named after Publius Cornelius Scipio Africanus, the Roman general and later consul. Her name under French service was in honour of Luc Urbain de Bouëxic, comte de Guichen.

== Design ==
The Capitani Romani-class were originally designed as scout cruisers for ocean operations ("ocean scout", esploratori oceanici), although some authors consider them to have been heavy destroyers. After the war the two units still in service were reclassified as flotilla leaders (caccia conduttori).

The design was fundamentally a light, almost unarmoured hull with a large power plant and cruiser style armament. The original design was modified to sustain the prime requirements of speed and firepower. Given their machinery development of 93,210 kW (125,000 hp), equivalent to that of the 17,000-ton cruisers of the Des Moines class, the target speed was over 41 knots (76 km/h; 47 mph), but the ships were left virtually unarmoured. As a result, the three completed warships achieved 43 knots (80 km/h) during trials. The Capitani Romani-class vessels shipped a main battery of eight 135 mm (5 in) guns, with a rate of fire of eight rounds per minute and a range of 19,500 m (21,300 yd). They also carried eight 533 mm (21 in) torpedo tubes. The wartime load dropped the operational speed by one to five knots (1.9 to 9.3 km/h; 1.2 to 5.8 mph), depending on the source.

== History ==
=== Regia Marina service ===
Ordered under the 1938 naval program, Scipione Africano was the tenth member of her class, laid down at the Odero-Terni-Orlando (OTO) shipyard in Livorno on 28 September 1939. Due to shortages of high strength steel caused by sanctions imposed on Italy by France and Britain, work progressed slowly and the cruiser was launched on 12 January 1941. Once again, material shortages led to a drawn out fitting-out, so it was not until 23 April 1943 that Scipione Africano was completed and commissioned into the Regia Marina.

Scipione Africano was assigned to the Fleet Destroyer Group upon her entry into service, and took part in the large exercises of May 1943. In July, it was decided to send the cruiser to reinforce the squadron at Taranto, as the Allied powers had invaded Sicily and it was only a matter of time before the Straits of Messina were closed. The movement was known as Operazione Scilla (Operation Scylla).

==== Operation Scylla ====
Equipped with the Italian-developed EC.3 Gufo radar, she detected and engaged four British Elco motor torpedo boats lurking five miles (8.0 km) ahead during the night of 17 July 1943, while passing the Messina straits at high speed off Punta Posso. She sank MTB 316 and heavily damaged MTB 313 between Reggio di Calabria and Pellaro. The engagement lasted no more than three minutes. Scipione Africano suffered minor damage and two injuries among its crew when German and Italian artillery batteries deployed along the Italian coast opened fire in the aftermath. The cruiser had been ordered from La Spezia to Taranto, which she eventually reached at 9:46 AM. Her high speed was decisive to the outcome of the battle.

==== Taranto to the armistice ====
After her eventful passage into the Ionian Sea, Scipione Africano was assigned to the Taranto light cruiser group (Gruppo Incrociatori Leggeri) alongside her sister Pompeo Magno and the light cruiser Luigi Cadorna. As part of operations to discourage Allied interventions on the evacuation of Sicily, she laid down four minefields in the Gulf of Taranto and the Gulf of Squillace from 4 to 17 August, together with Luigi Cadorna.

On 8 September 1943, the Armistice of Cassibile was announced, signaling Italy's capitulation to the Allied powers. On the morning of 9 September, Scipione Africano was ordered to head north into the Adriatic, to Pescara, to evacuate the heads of government. Along the way she ran into a pair of hostile German S-boats (S-54 and S-61) who had fled Taranto the prior evening, but they made smoke and escaped before the cruiser could engage. She made Pescara shortly after midnight, but in turned out that her charges had already left on the corvette Baionetta. Scipione Africano reversed her course and caught up to the corvette, which had also taken aboard King Vittorio Emanuele III and his family, at 0700 the next day, and escorted it to Brindisi, driving off a Luftwaffe air attack along the way.

On 29 September 1943, Scipione Africano departed Brindisi for Malta, carrying aboard her Marshal Badoglio, the effective head of government. Arriving at Valletta the same day, Badoglio signed the terms of the ‘long armistice’ aboard the British battleship Nelson, which confirmed the Italian surrender and made official its entry into the war on the side of the Allies as a co-belligerent power.

==== Co-belligerent and post-war service ====
Scipione Africano spent the remainder of the war still active in the Regia Marina, fighting alongside the Allied ships, collecting an additional 146 missions and 56,637 nmi (104,892 km; 65,177 mi) steamed. After the war, she was moved to La Spezia in preparation of the post-war treaties, which were to strip the Regia Marina – which became the Marina Militare in 1946 – of many of its ships as war reparations. Scipione Africano was assigned to France, along with her sister Attilio Regolo, by the Paris Peace Treaty of 1947, and was duly decommissioned from the Marina Militare on 8 August 1948. Renamed ‘S.7’, she sailed for Toulon, and there was officially sold to France on 15 August.

=== Marine Nationale service ===
S.7 was commissioned into the Marine Nationale as the light cruiser Guichen and was assigned to the 2nd Light Cruiser Division on 7 September. She took part in operations to transport the French gold reserves back to France in 1949, and in March 1951 was re-classified as a ‘destroyer-escorteur de 1re classe' (1st class destroyer escort). On 14 July 1951 Guichen began a massive reconstruction at the La Seyne dockyard intended to modernize her and better integrate her into the French fleet, fitting her with new weaponry and sensor systems. Work completed in 1953, and she was returned to service in 1955 as an 'Escorteur d'Escadre' (Fleet Escort) with the following characteristics:

- Displacement (full): 5,500 tonnes
- Length: 141.8 metres (465 ft)
- Beam: 14.4 metres (47 ft)
- Draught: 4.1 metres (13 ft)
- Machinery - unchanged
- Armament:
  - 3x2 – 10.5 cm/65 SK C/37 guns (formerly German)
  - 5x2 – Bofors 57 mm/60 Me 1951 autocannons
  - 4x3 – 550 mm Mle KT 50 torpedo tubes
- Sensors:
  - Surveillance Radars: DRBV 20A, DRBV 11
  - Navigation Radar: DRBN 31
  - Fire Control Radars: 1x DRBC 11 (10.5 cm), 2x DRBC 30 (57mm)
  - Sonar: DUBVA 1A/B
- Crew: 353

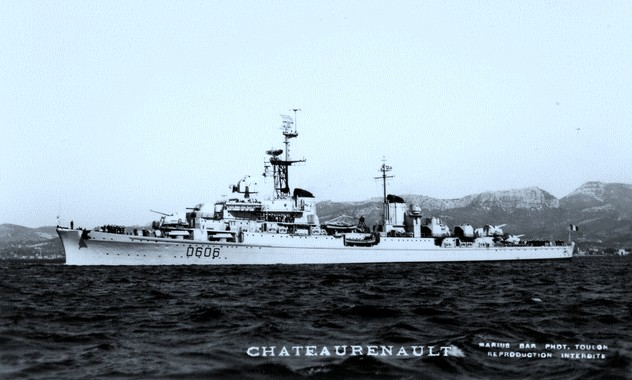
D606 Chateaurenault, the former Attilio Regolo

The refit reduced the stability of the ship, caused the maximum speed to fall to 39 kn (72 km/h; 45 mph), and the operational range to 3,600 nmi (6,700 km; 4,100 mi) at 18 knots. However, the sensor suite was much more complete, and the ship had a much more powerful anti-aircraft and anti-submarine warfare capability than it did before. Upon re-commissioning Guichen gained the NATO hull pennant D 607, and was assigned to the 2nd Division out of Bizerte. In 1957 Guichen was refit once more, in order to make her a command ship, which removed one of her aft 10.5 cm (4.1 in) mounts and a pair of torpedo banks in exchange for better radar and command facilities, and subsequently became the flagship of the Atlantic Light Fleet. Guichen was replaced in this role by her sister Châteaurenault on 16 April 1961, and subsequently placed in reserve. She was disarmed in June 1963, and used as a floating platform for the Lanvéoc Poulmic naval school. She was struck from the French naval register on 1 June 1976, given the serial number Q 554, and was finally sold for demolition in January 1982.
