= Gufo radar =

Italian naval search radar developed during World War II

Gufo
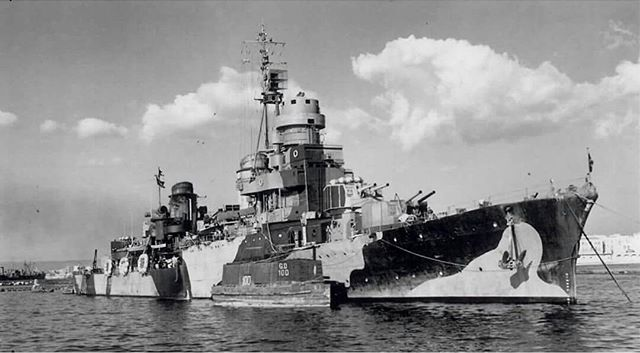
- Gufo radar antennae at the masthead of the Italian cruiser Scipione Africano
- Country of origin: Italy
- Introduced: 1941
- No. built: ±140
- Type: Search radar
- Frequency: 400 – 750 MHz
- PRF: 500 Hz
- Beamwidth: 6° (horizontal), 12° (vertical)
- Pulsewidth: 4 μs
- RPM: 3
- Range: 25–80 km (16–50 mi)
- Power: 10 kW
- Other Names: EC-3 ter

The Gufo radar (Owl) was an Italian naval search radar developed during World War II by the Regio Istituto Elettrotecnico e delle Comunicazioni della Marina (RIEC). Also known as the EC-3 ter.

== Description ==
The first prototypes were designed by navy technicians Ugo Tiberio, Nello Carrara and Alfeo Brandimarte in the period 1936–1937. The project was stalled due to budget cuts until 1941, when interest was revived soon after the Italian navy suffered a series of heavy setbacks in night actions against the radar-equipped units of the Royal Navy, especially that of the Battle of Cape Matapan.

The first tests were conducted on board the torpedo boat Giacinto Carini in April 1941. The radar sets were produced by the Italian company SAFAR. Only 12 devices had been installed on board Italian warships by 8 September 1943, the day Italy signed an armistice with the Allies. Beginning in the spring of 1943, the recommendation of the Italian high command was to switch the radar on only in proximity of enemy forces, after an incorrect German advisory that the British had radar warning receivers similar to the Metox. The Allies, however, did not develop such technology until 1944. In spite of this, it has been reported that the crews made a wide use of the Gufo as a search radar, omitting to mention it on the ship's logbook to avoid sanctions.

The radar was used in combat by the light cruiser Scipione Africano on the night of 17 July 1943, while on passage from La Spezia to Taranto, when she detected a flotilla of four British Elco motor torpedo boats five miles ahead in the strait of Messina. One of the motor boats, MTB 316, was destroyed by the cruiser's guns, and another one was seriously damaged. Twelve British seamen lost their lives.

== See also ==
- Operation Scylla

== Bibliography ==
- Baroni, Piero (2007). La guerra dei radar : il suicidio dell'Italia : 1935/1943 (in Italian). Milano: Greco & Greco. ISBN 978-8879804318.
- Galati, Gaspare (2016). "Chapter 2. The Owls and the Gufo. Birth of Italian Radar". 100 Years of Radar (PDF). doi:10.1007/978-3-319-00584-3_2. ISBN 978-3-319-00584-3.
- Pope, Dudley (1998). Flag 4 : the battle of Coastal Forces in the Mediterranean 1939–1945. London: Chatham. ISBN 1-86176-067-1.
- Preston, Antony; Ando, Elio (1978). "Capitani Romani". Warship. 5: 155.
- Romano, Salvatore (1997-07-26). "History of the development of radar technology in Italy".
- Swords, Sean S. (1986). Technical History of the Beginnings of Radar. London: IET/Peter Peregrinus. doi:10.1049/PBHT006E. ISBN 0-86341-043-X.
