= Capitani Romani-class cruiser =

Italian class of light cruisers

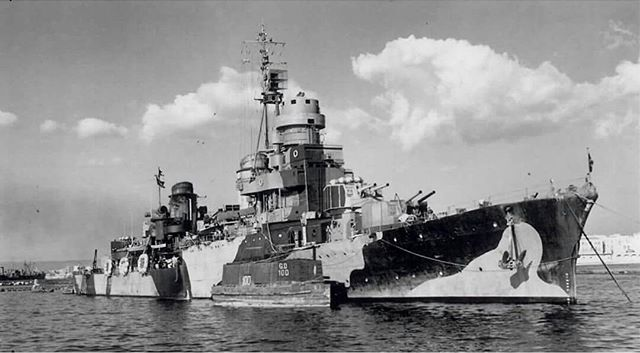
- Scipione Africano

Class overview
- Name: Capitani Romani class
- Builders: Cantieri Navali Riuniti; Navalmeccanica; Odero Terni Orlando
- Operators: Regia Marina; Italian Navy; French Navy
- Subclasses: San Giorgio class
- Built: 1939–1942
- In commission: 1942–1980
- Planned: 12
- Completed: 4
- Canceled: 8
- Scrapped: 4

General characteristics
- Type: Light cruiser
- Displacement: 3,745 t (3,686 long tons) (standard); 5,420 t (5,330 long tons) (full load)
- Length: 142.2 m (466 ft 6 in) (overall)
- Beam: 14.4 m (47 ft 3 in)
- Draught: 4.1 m (13 ft 5 in)
- Installed power: 4 water-tube boilers; 110,000 shp (82,000 kW)
- Propulsion: 2 shafts; 2 geared steam turbines
- Speed: 41 knots (76 km/h; 47 mph)
- Range: 4,350 nmi (8,060 km; 5,010 mi) at 18 knots (33 km/h; 21 mph)
- Complement: 418
- Sensors & processing systems: EC-3/ter Gufo radar
- Armament: 4 × twin 135 mm (5.3 in) DP guns; 8 × single 37 mm (1.5 in) AA guns; 4 × twin 20 mm (0.8 in) AA guns; 2 × quadruple 533 mm (21 in) torpedo tubes; 70 × mines
- Armour: Turrets: 6–20 mm (0.24–0.79 in); Conning tower: 15 mm (0.59 in)

The Capitani Romani class was a class of light cruisers acting as flotilla leaders for the Regia Marina (Italian Navy). They were built to outrun and outgun the large new French destroyers of the Le Fantasque and Mogador classes. Twelve hulls were ordered in late 1939, but only four were completed, just three of these before the Italian armistice in 1943. The ships were named after prominent ancient Romans (Capitani Romani (lit. Roman Captains)).

== Design ==
The Capitani Romani class were originally designed as scout cruisers for ocean operations ("ocean scout", esploratori oceanici), although some authors consider them to have been heavy destroyers. After the war the two units still in service were reclassified as flotilla leaders (caccia conduttori).

The design was fundamentally a light, almost unarmoured hull with a large power plant and cruiser style armament. The original design was modified to sustain the prime requirements of speed and firepower. Given their machinery development of 93,210 kW (125,000 hp), equivalent to that of the 17,000-ton cruisers of the Des Moines class, the target speed was over 41 knots (76 km/h; 47 mph), but the ships were left virtually unarmoured. As a result, the three completed warships achieved 43 knots (80 km/h) during trials. The Capitani Romani-class vessels shipped a main battery of eight 135 mm (5.3 in) DP guns, with a rate of fire of eight rounds per minute and a range of 19,500 m (21,300 yd). They also carried eight 533 mm (21 in) torpedo tubes. The wartime load dropped the operational speed by one to five knots (1.9 to 9.3 km/h; 1.2 to 5.8 mph), depending on the source.

== Operational history ==
Only Scipione Africano and Attilio Regolo saw combat.

Scipione Africano detected and engaged four British Elco motor torpedo boats during the night of 17 July 1943 en route to Taranto, while passing the Messina straits at high speed off Punta Posso. She sank MTB 316 and heavily damaged MTB 313 between Reggio di Calabria and Pellaro. She laid down four minefields in the Gulf of Taranto and the Gulf of Squillace from 4 to 17 August, together with the old light cruiser Luigi Cadorna.

Attilio Regolo was torpedoed by the submarine HMS Unruffled on 7 November 1942, and remained in drydock for several months with her bow shattered.

== Ships ==
Four of the ships were scrapped before launch. Five were captured by the Germans in September 1943, still under construction. All five were sunk in harbour, one was raised and completed. Three were completed before the Italian armistice.

Construction data
Ship	Namesake	Builder	Laid down	Launched	Completed	Operational history
Attilio Regolo	Marcus Atilius Regulus	O.T.O., Livorno	28 September 1939	28 August 1940	15 May 1942	Commissioned in August 1942 and used as a mine-layer until seriously damaged by a torpedo in November. Ceded to France in 1948 renamed Châteaurenault.
Giulio Germanico	Germanicus	Navalmeccanica, Castellammare di Stabia	3 April 1939	26 July 1941	19 January 1956	Captured by the Germans in Castellammare di Stabia while under completion, and scuttled by them on 28 September 1943. Raised and completed for the Italian Navy after the war. Renamed San Marco, she served as a destroyer leader until her decommission in 1971.
Pompeo Magno	Pompey the Great	CNR, Ancona	23 September 1939	24 August 1941	4 June 1943	Renamed San Giorgio, served as a destroyer leader until 1963; decommissioned and scrapped in 1980
Scipione Africano	Scipio Africanus	O.T.O., Livorno	28 September 1939	12 January 1941	23 April 1943	Ceded to France in 1948 and first renamed S7, then renamed Guichen; scrapped 1979

Uncompleted Capitani Romani–class cruisers
Ship	Namesake	Builder	Laid down	Launched	Operational history
Caio Mario	Gaius Marius	O.T.O., Livorno	28 September 1939	17 August 1941	Captured by the Germans in La Spezia, with only the hull completed; used as a floating oil tank and scuttled in 1944
Claudio Druso	Nero Claudius Drusus	Cantiere del Tirreno, Riva Trigoso	27 September 1939	—N/a	Construction cancelled June 1940, scrapped between 1941 and February 1942
Claudio Tiberio	Emperor Tiberius	O.T.O., Livorno	28 September 1939	—N/a	Construction cancelled June 1940; scrapped between November 1941 and February 1942
Cornelio Silla	Lucius Cornelius Sulla	Ansaldo, Genoa	12 October 1939	28 June 1941	Captured by the Germans in Genoa while fitting out; sunk in an air raid in July 1944
Ottaviano Augusto	Emperor Augustus	CNR, Ancona	23 September 1939	28 April 1941	Captured by the Germans in Ancona while under completion; sunk in an air attack on 1 November 1943
Paolo Emilio	Lucius Aemilius Paullus Macedonicus	Ansaldo, Genoa	12 October 1939	—N/a	Construction cancelled in June 1940, scrapped between October 1941 and February 1942
Ulpio Traiano	Emperor Trajan	CNR, Palermo	28 September 1939	30 November 1942	Sunk 3 January 1943 by British human torpedo attack while fitting out in Palermo
Vipsanio Agrippa	Marcus Vipsanius Agrippa	Cantiere del Tirreno, Riva Trigoso	October 1939	—N/a	Construction cancelled June 1940; scrapped between July 1941 and August 1942

== Post-war French service ==
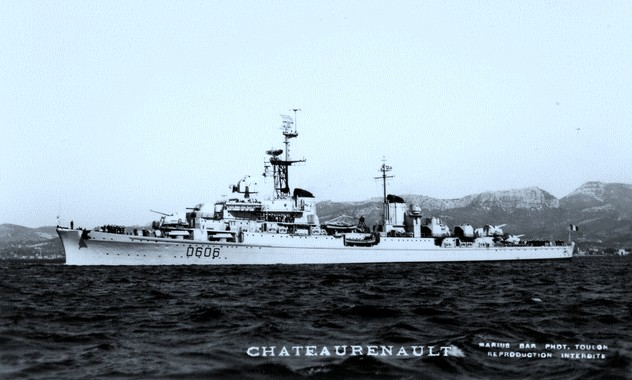
D606 Chateaurenault, the former Attilio Regolo

Attilio Regolo and Scipione Africano were transferred to France as war reparations. They were renamed Chateaurenault and Guichen respectively. The ships were extensively rebuilt for the French Navy by La Seyne dockyard with new anti-aircraft-focused armament and fire-control systems in 1951–1954. The ships were decommissioned in 1961.

General characteristics as rebuilt

- Displacement
- Length
- Beam
- Draught
- Machinery - unchanged
- Armament
  - 6 – 105 mm guns (three twin turrets of German origin)
  - 10 – 57 mm guns (5 twin turrets)
  - 12 – 550 mm torpedo tubes
- Sensors: Radar DRBV 20 A, DRBV 11, DRBC 11, DRBC 30, Sonar
- Crew: 353

== Post-war Italian service ==
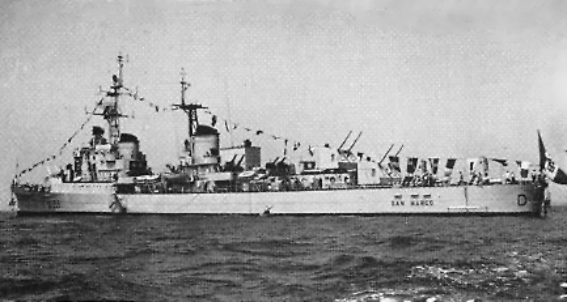
San Marco, formerly Giulio Germanico, in 1959

Giulio Germanico and Pompeo Magno served in the post war Marina Militare, being renamed San Marco (D 563) and San Giorgio (D 562) respectively and reclassified as destroyers. Both ships were extensively rebuilt in 1951–1955 and fitted with American weapons and radar. Characteristics included:

General characteristics as rebuilt

- Six 127 mm (5 in) guns in twin turrets fitted in 'A', 'X' and 'Y' positions, with anti-aircraft capability
- a Menon anti-submarine mortar fitted in 'B' position
- fitting of 20 40 mm (1.6 in) Bofors AA guns
- SPS-6 and SG-6B radar, SQS-11 sonar and the Mk37 fire control system for the 127 mm guns

San Marco was further rebuilt as a cadet training ship in 1963–1965 when she was fitted with new CODAG machinery. New 76 mm (3 in) guns replaced the 40 mm and 'X' 127 mm mounting. San Marco was decommissioned in 1971, San Giorgio following in 1980.

== Bibliography ==
- Ando, Elio (1978). "Capitani Romani: Part 1, Design and Construction". In Preston, Antony (ed.). Warship II. London: Conway Maritime Press. pp. 146–157. ISBN 0-85177-149-1.
- Ando, Elio (31 December 1984). "Capitani Romani: Part 2, Operational History". In Preston, Antony (ed.). Warship II. London: Conway Maritime Press. pp. 246–257. ISBN 0-85177-149-1.
- Bishop, Chris (2002). The Encyclopedia of Weapons of WWII: The Comprehensive Guide to Over 1,500 Weapons Systems, Including Tanks, Small Arms, Warplanes, Artillery, Ships, and Submarines. Sterling Publishing. ISBN 1-58663-762-2.
- Brescia, Maurizio (2012). Mussolini's Navy: A Reference Guide to the Regina Marina 1930–45. Annapolis, Maryland: Naval Institute Press. ISBN 978-1-59114-544-8.
- Campbell, John (1985). Naval Weapons of World War Two. Annapolis, Maryland: Naval Institute Press. ISBN 0-87021-459-4.
- Chesneau, Roger, ed. (1980). Conway's All the World's Fighting Ships 1922–1946. Conway Maritime Press. ISBN 0-85177-146-7.
- Fraccaroli, Aldo (1968). Italian Warships of World War 2. Shepperton, UK: Ian Allan Publishing.
- Gardiner, Robert & Brown, David K. (2004). The Eclipse of the Big Gun: The Warship 1906–1945. Conway Maritime Press. ISBN 0-85177-953-0.
- Green, Jack & Massignani, Alessandro (1998). The Naval War in the Mediterranean, 1940–1943. London: Chatham Publishing. ISBN 1-885119-61-5.
- Jordan, John (2005). "The Escorteurs Rapides Châteaurenault and Guichen". In Jordan, John (ed.). Warship 2005. London: Conway. pp. 136–139. ISBN 1-84486-003-5.
- Rohwer, Jürgen (2005). Chronology of the War at Sea 1939–1945: The Naval History of World War Two (Third Revised ed.). Annapolis, Maryland: Naval Institute Press. ISBN 1-59114-119-2.
- Sadkovich, James (1990). Reevaluating Major Naval Combatants of World War II. Greenwood Press. ISBN 0-313-26149-0.
- Stille, Mark (2018). Italian Cruisers of World War II. Oxford, UK: Osprey Publishing. ISBN 978-1-4728-2535-3.
- Tomlin, Barbara (2004). With Utmost Spirit: Allied Naval Operations in the Mediterranean, 1942–1945. University Press of Kentucky. ISBN 0-8131-2338-0.
- Whitley, M. J. (1995). Cruisers of World War Two: An International Encyclopedia. Annapolis, Maryland: Naval Institute Press. ISBN 1-55750-141-6.
