= List of Peruvian Navy ships =

List of ships of the Peruvian Navy comprising almost every Peruvian warship commissioned after 1840.

== Vessels acquired in the 1840s and 1850s ==
President Castilla sought to expand and the Peruvian Navy and equip it well. His naval policy was to construct two ships for each one Chile built, and he went on to turn the Peruvian Navy into the most powerful in South America. He acquired the frigates Mercedes, Guisse, Gamarra, Amazonas, and Apurimac and the schooners Tumbes and Loa. He also built the naval ports of Paita and Bellavista. Castilla also acquired the first steam-powered warship of any South American country and named her Rimac. To better educate the officers of these new ships, he sent them to study with the various navies of European nations. For the defense of the Amazon, Castilla began to develop an Amazonian fleet with the purchase of the ships Morona, Pastaza, Napo, and Putumayo.

=== Major warships ===
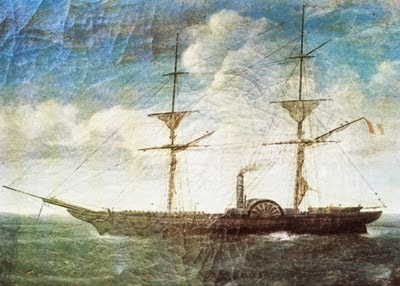
The paddle-steamer Rimac

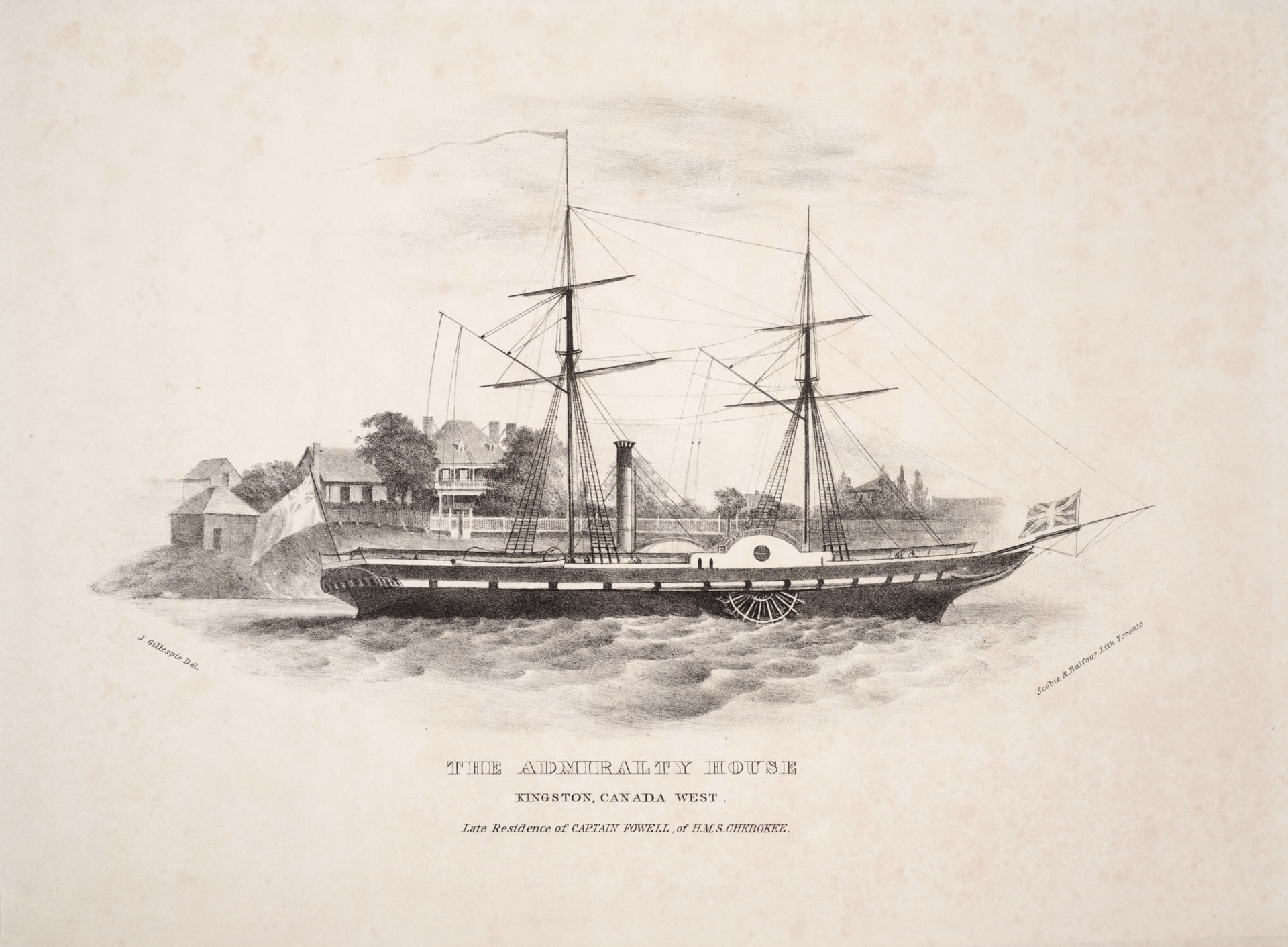
The paddle-steamer Ucayali ex-HMS Cherokee in 1848

- Rimac (1847/8), sidewwheel paddle steamer with brigantine rig, 683 tons. Sank 1855 after a collision at Punta San Juan, Ica, Peru.
- Mercedes (1840s-1850s) sailing frigate, wrecked at Casma in 1854
- Amazonas (1851) screw frigate, 1,743 tons BOM, 33 guns, 9.43 kn (17.46 km/h; 10.85 mph). Beached and lost on Abtao Island, 15 January 1866.

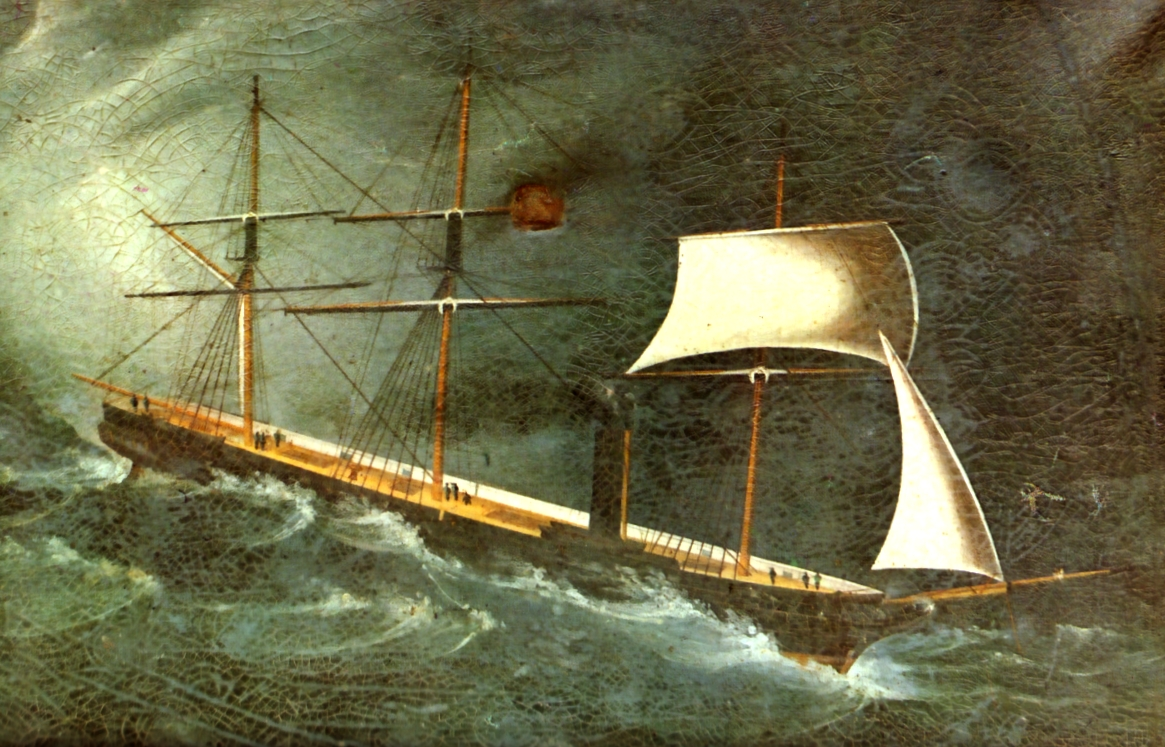
The screw-frigate Amazonas

- Ucayali (1842) sidewheel paddle steamer with brigantine rig, ex-HMS Cherokee, 860 tons. Purchased in 1853.
- Apurímac (1855) 44-gun screw frigate, 1,666 tons – took part on the rebel side in the Peruvian Civil War of 1856–1858; she was renamed BAP Callao on 22 April 1858, and took part in the blockade of the Ecuadorian port of Guayaquil; in December she was in a floating dock that capsized and sank, killing 100 people and injuring 88; she was raised on the second attempt in 1863, and then rebuilt and reverted to her original name; she took part in the Peruvian Civil War of 1865, and the Battle of Abtao against the Spanish Navy screw frigates Reina Blanca and Villa de Madrid in 1866. From 1873 she served as a training ship, and in the War of the Pacific (1879–1884) served as an armed pontoon at Callao until scuttled to prevent capture in 1881.

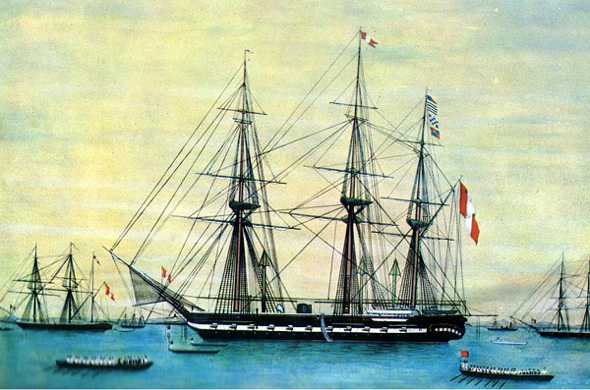
Apurímac, anchored in Callao in 1855

=== Minor warships ===
- Almirante Guise (1845) 415-ton sailing brigantine.
- Gamarra (1845) 415-ton sailing brigantine.
- Loa (1854) 648 ton BOM screw schooner: 10 kn (18.5 km/h; 11.5 mph), armament 4 × 32-pdr. Took part on the rebel side in Peruvian Civil War of 1856–1858. Between April and November 1864, she was converted into an ironclad floating battery similar to he Confederate States Navy′s CSS Richmond. – see under ironclads
- Tumbes (1854) 250-ton BOM screw schooner: 7 kn (13 km/h; 8.1 mph) armament 2 × 68-pdr. Took part in Peruvian Civil War of 1856–1858 and the Peruvian Civil War of 1865. Stricken 1866 and used as a pontoon at Callao. Sunk by the Chilean Navy 29 May 1880.

=== Transport vessels ===
- Lautaro (1853) screw steamer, ex-Peytona, 480 tons. Purchased in 1857, named Lambayaque and renamed General Lerzundi. Sold to the Chilean Navy 1865 and renamed Lautaro..

=== Gunboats ===
- Morona (1862), 500-ton steam river gunboat – part of the Amazonian fleet that arrived at Iquitos in 1864
- Pastaza (1862), 500-ton steam river gunboat – part of the Amazonian fleet that arrived at Iquitos in 1864
- Napo (1862), steam river gunboat – part of the Amazonian fleet that arrived at Iquitos in 1864
- Putumayo (1862), steam river gunboat – part of the Amazonian fleet that arrived at Iquitos in 1864

== Vessels acquired from 1860 to 1884 ==
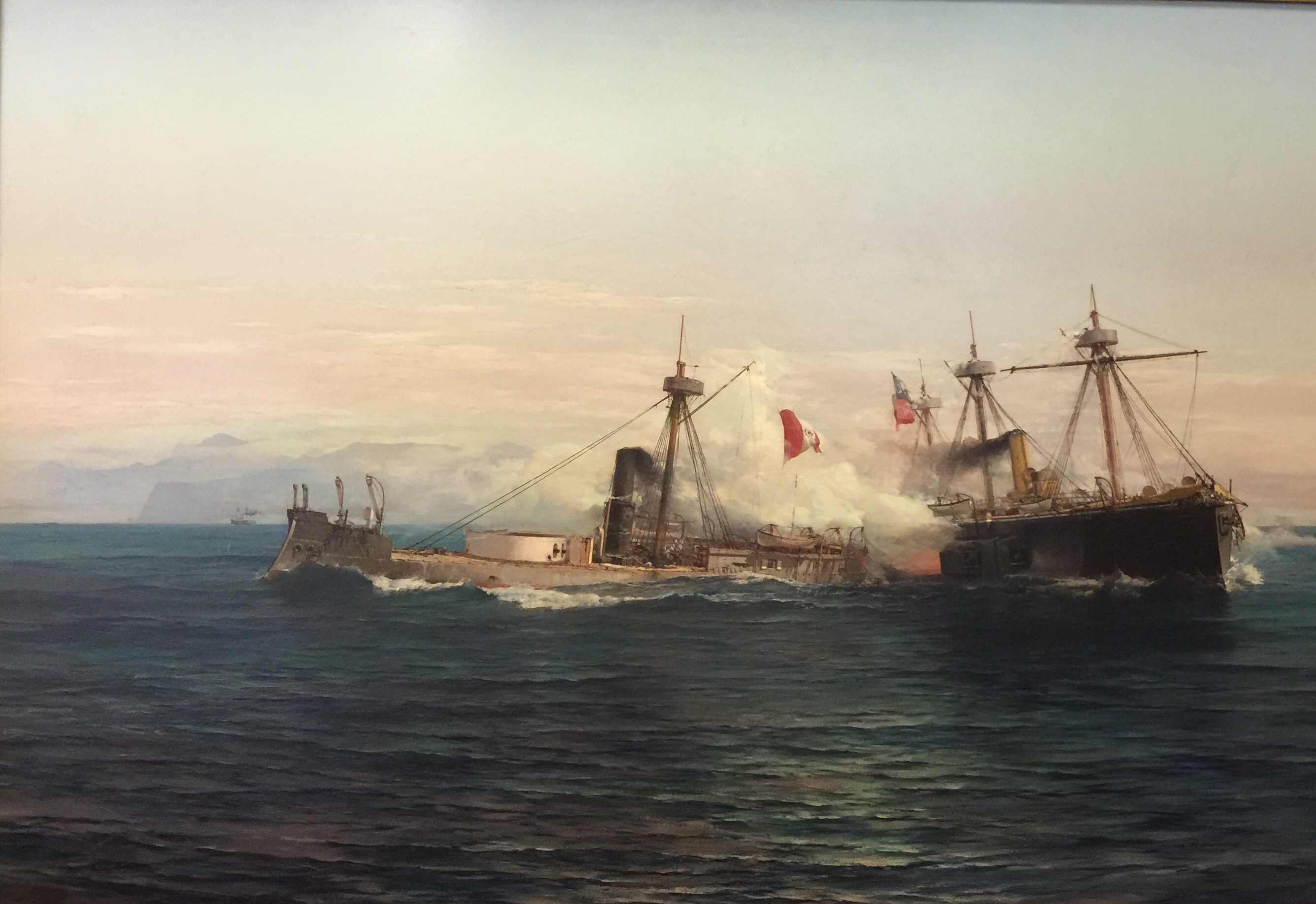
BAP Huascar

=== Ironclads ===
- Huáscar (1865) turret ship, 2030 tons, captured by Chile at the Battle of Angamos 1879.
- Independencia (1865), broadside ironclad 3,500 tons, shipwrecked in Punta Gruesa sunk aftermath the Battle of Iquique 1879.

=== Coast defence ironclads ===
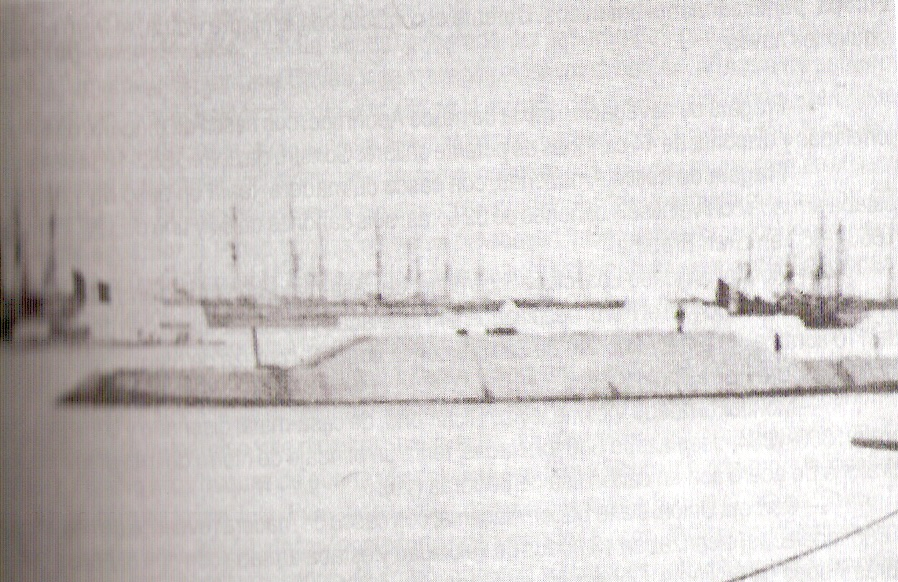
The Loa being fitted after its conversion in the Callao harbour, 1864

- Loa (1854) 648 ton BOM steam schooner that took part on the rebel side in 1856–58 Peruvian civil war. From April to November 1864, Loa was converted into an ironclad similar to the CSS Richmond. The conversion was by George S. Backus, and cost 364,823 soles de plata, equivalent to £70,000 Sterling. In 1877 the armour was removed and the Loa became a training ship. She was scuttled at Callao in January 1881 to prevent capture.
- Victoria (1866) a locally-built small monitor armed with a single 68-pdr Vavasseur smoothbore gun.

ex-US Canonicus-class monitors 2,100 tons.

- Atahualpa (1864). ex-USS Catawba; Atahualpa and Manco Cápac were purchased by Peru in 1868 for $400,000 US, and left New Orleans in January 1869, arriving in Peru in June 1870. Atahualpa was scuttled at Callao to avoid capture 1881.
- Manco Cápac (1864) ex-USS Oneota purchased by Peru in 1868, and arriving with Atahualpa in June 1870, scuttled at Arica to avoid capture 1880. Wreck was located in 2007, 2.5 miles off shore at depth of 100 feet.

=== Steam corvettes ===
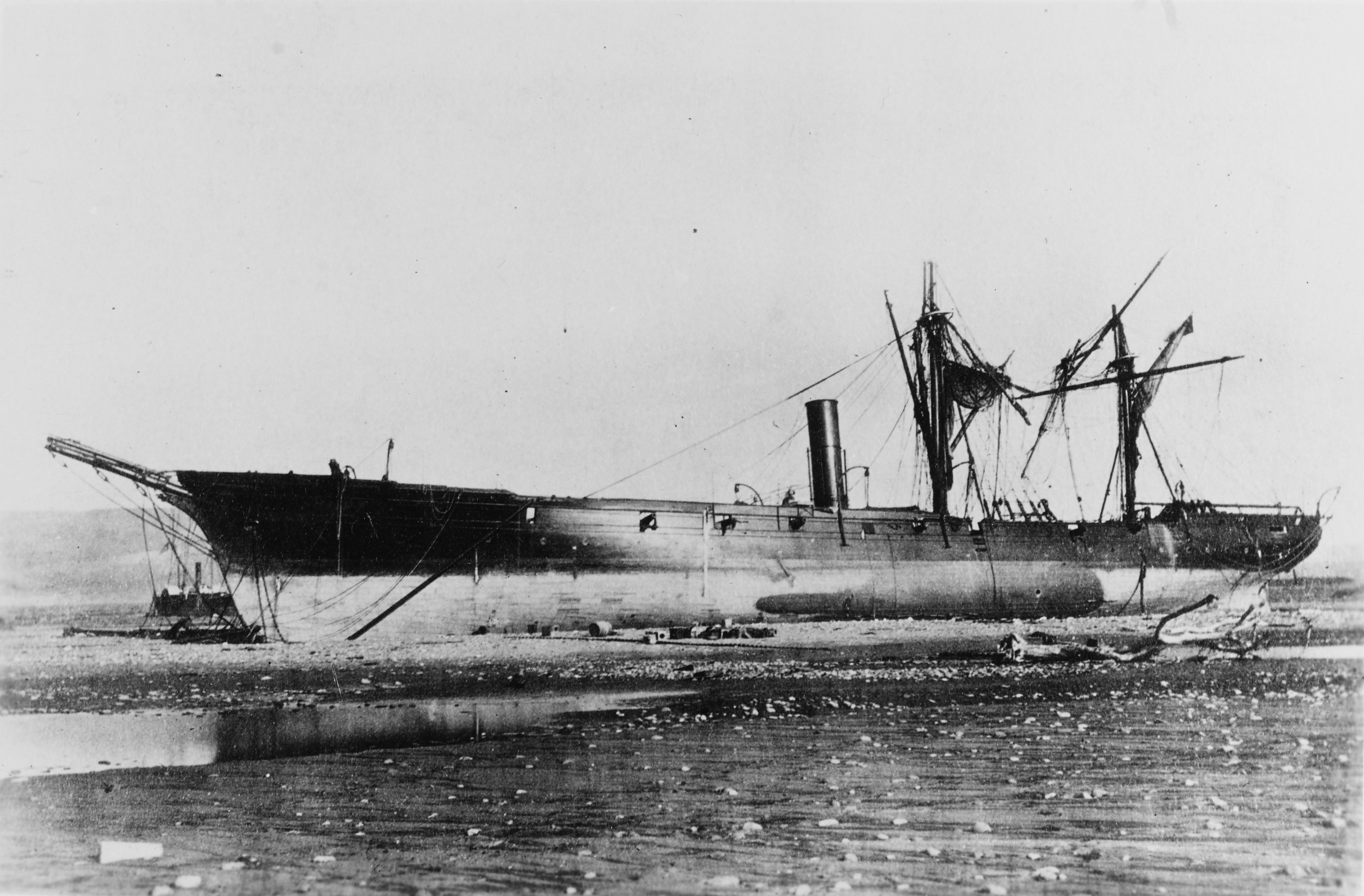
The corvette America wrecked by the 1868 tsunami at Arica

- Unión (1864) ex-CSS Georgia, screw corvette 2017 tons [1,150 tons BOM]. Sold to Peru after the French government stopped to sale to the Confederacy. Scuttled January 1881 to avoid capture.
- America (1864) ex-CSS Texas, screw corvette and sister-ship of BAP Union. Sold to Peru after the French government stopped to sale to the Confederacy. Lost during the Arica tsunami on 13 August 1868.
- Pilcomayo (1874) gun vessel 600 tons BOM.
- Chanchamayo (1874) gun vessel 600 tons BOM. shipwrecked in Falsa Punta Aguja in the north of Peru, 1876.

=== Cruisers ===
Lima class cruisers, 1,700 tons.

- Lima (1880), build in Kiel as a merchant ship Socrates to mislead the Chileans. Converted in an armoured gunboat in England and but embargoed by the Government of Great Britain in 1881, alleging the principle of neutrality. Arrived to Peru 1889. Refitted in Panama and rearmed 1920 as cruiser, then used as a submarine base ship, discarded 1935.
- Diogenes (1881), build in Kiel as a merchant ship to mislead the Chileans, but embargoed by the Government of Great Britain in 1881, alleging the principle of neutrality. She was never armed or delivered to Peru (and hence kept its original merchant ship name), purchased by Japan 1895, but not delivered, acquired by US Navy in 1898 and renamed USS Topeka.

=== Torpedo boats ===
Republica class Herreshoff spar torpedo boats.

- Republica (No. 1) (1881) blown up by her crew to avoid falling into enemy hands on January 3, 1881.
- Alianza (No. 2) (1880) blown up by her crew to avoid falling into enemy hands on June 8, 1880.
- Allay (No. 3) captured by Chile in December 1879 on her delivery voyage to Callao and renamed Guacolda.
- No. 4, never completed.

=== Submarines ===
- Toro Submarino (1880), local design by Federico Blume displacing 7.5 tons, scuttled to avoid capture at Callao 1881.

=== Gunboats ===
- Iquitos (1875) Converted merchant vessel, 50 tons. Rebuilt 1896, stricken 1967.
- Santa Rosa (1883) 420 tons, 2 × 6 in guns. Still in service 1905.
- Coronel Portillo (1???) ex-San Pablo. Converted merchant vessel, 49 tons. <---It has been assumed that this vessel was of similar date to Iquitos because it looks similar in the photos in Janes---> (Conways' 1947-95 says launched 1902, extant 1947)

Yavari and Yapura cargo-passenger gunboats, 500 GRT. Both vessels were built in parts in England in 1862 and assembled in Puno on Lake Titicaca.

- Yavari (1861) Commissioned 1871. Lengthened by 12m in the 19th century. Converted to diesel engine 1914. Paid off 1990 after 119 years service. Now open as a museum moored near the Sonesta Posada Hotel del Inca.
- Yapura (1861) Commissioned 1873. Probably converted to diesel in 1914. Still in service in 2012 under the name BAP Puno (ABH-306) as a hospital ship stationed on Lake Titicaca.

=== Transport vessels ===
- Talismán (1876) transport steamer 1,310 tons BOM.
- Chalaco (1864) transport steamer 1,000 tons BOM, armed with two 40-pr and machineguns.
- Limeña (1865) paddle transport 1,163 tons BOM, armed with two 40-pr and machineguns.
- BAP Oroya (1873) paddle transport 1,597 tons BOM.
- Rímac (1872) transport steamer 1,805 tons captured to the Chilean Navy in 1879.

== Vessels acquired from 1900 onwards ==
=== Cruisers ===
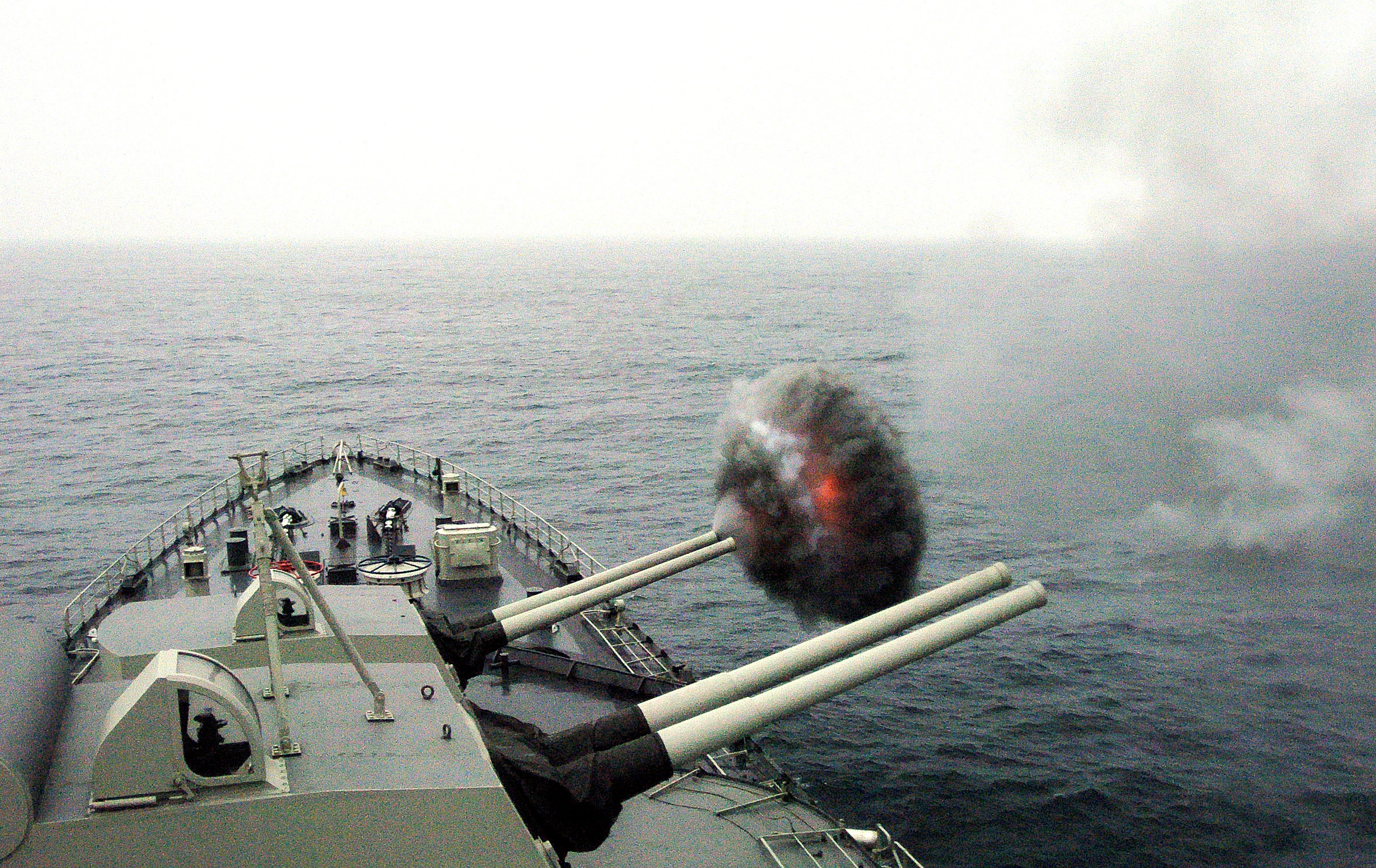
BAP Almirante Grau (CLM-81) firing its guns.

Almirante Grau class 3200 tons

- BAP Almirante Grau (1906) Completed 1907. Refitted at Balboa, boilers re-tubed and modified for oil burning 1923–25, re-boilered by Yarrow 1934–35 after which was good for 23.5 knots. Served as depot ships in the 1950s and used for administrative and training purposes. Stricken 24 December 1958.
- BAP Coronel Bolognesi (1906) Completed 1907. Refitted at Balboa, boilers re-tubed and modified for oil burning 1923–25, re-boilered by Yarrow 1934–35 after which was good for 23.5 knots. Served as depot ships in the 1950s and used for administrative and training purposes. Stricken 24 December 1958.

Crown Colony class, 11,090–11,110 tons full load.

- BAP Coronel Bolognesi (1942) CL-82 ex-HMS Ceylon Transferred to the Peruvian Navy 9 February 1960. Unlike her sister, Bolognesi had a lattice foremast and had an aft tripod mast, and radar fire control for its 4-in (102mm) AA guns. Discarded May 1982.
- BAP Almirante Grau (1941) CL-81 ex-HMS Newfoundland Incorporated into the Peruvian Navy 19 December 1959, and formally transferred 30 December 1959. Unlike her sister, Grau had two lattice masts. Renamed Capitán Quiñones 1973, and probably given pennant number CL-83 at the same time. Discarded 1979.

De Ruyter class

- BAP Almirante Grau (1944) CLM-81 ex-HNLMS De Ruyter, purchased 7 March 1973, commissioned 23 May 1973. modernised at Amersterdam March 1985 – January 1988, work completed in Callao later in 1988.
- BAP Aguirre (CH-84) ex-HNLMS De Zeven Provinciën (1978–1999)

=== Destroyers ===
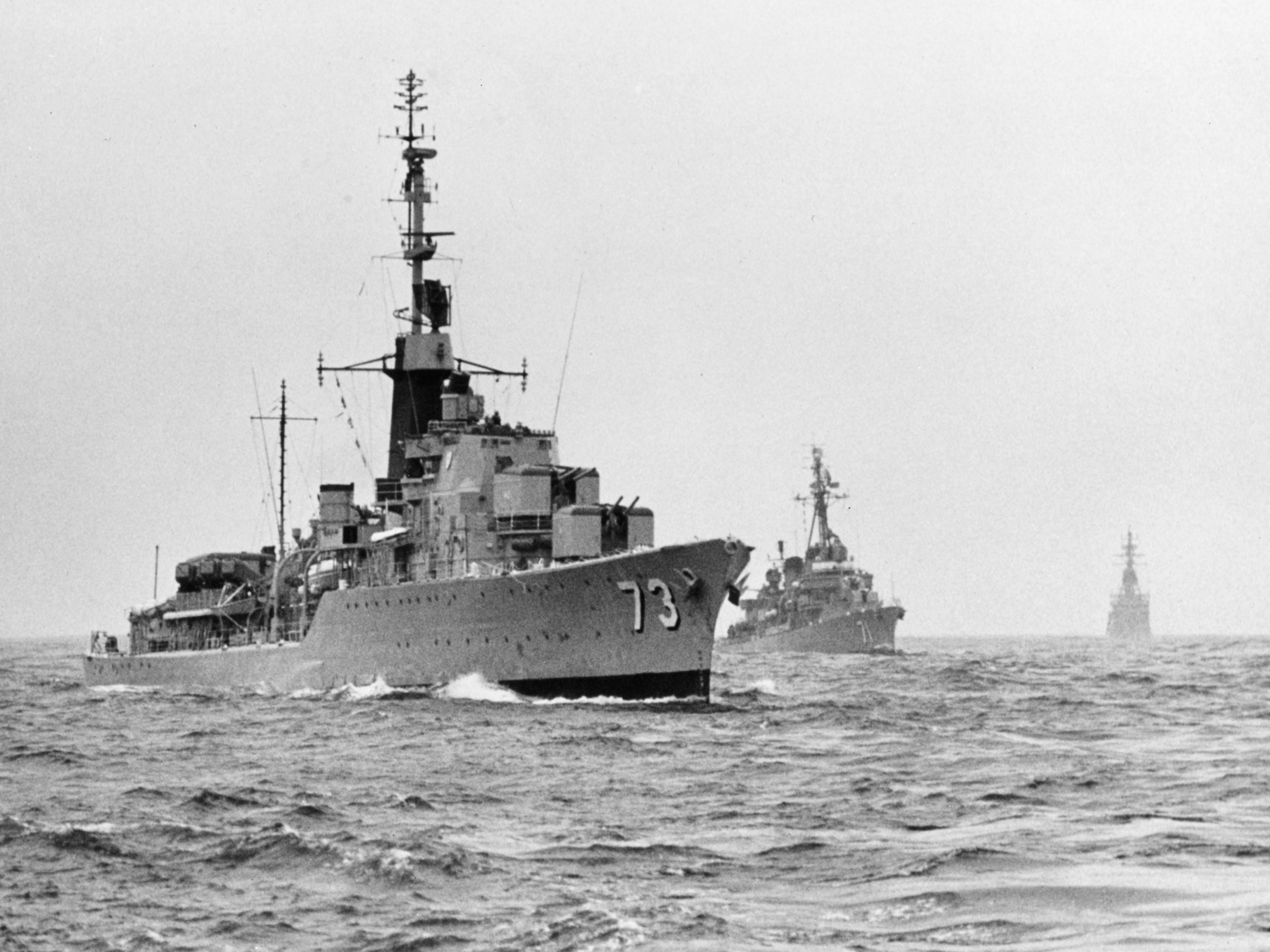
BAP Palacios DM-73 and BAP Villar DM-74, September 1973

French Chasseur class 490 tons

- Rodriguez (1909) ex-Actee. Arrived in Peru in 1914; stricken 1939, hulked.

ex-Russian ex-Estonian Izyaslav class

- Guise (1915) ex-Estonian Lennuk, ex-Russian Avtroil 1,350 tons. Completed for the Russian Navy 1917, captured by the Royal Navy in the Baltic December 1918 and transferred to Estonia. Purchased from the Estonian Navy 1933. Served in the Amazon flotilla. Discarded c. 1947.

ex-Russian ex-Estonian Orfey class

- Almirante Villar (1915) ex-Estonian Wambola, ex-Russian Spartak, ex-Kapitan 1-go ranga Miklukho-Maklai, ex-Kapitan Kinsbergen, 1,150 tons. Completed for the Russian Navy 1918, captured by the Royal Navy in the Baltic December 1918 and transferred to Estonia. Purchased from the Estonian Navy 1933. Served in the Amazon flotilla. Discarded c. 1954.

ex-US Fletcher class class

- BAP Villar (DD-71) ex-USS Benham (1960–1980)
- BAP Almirante Guise (DD-72) ex-USS Isherwood (1961–1981)

ex-British Daring class, 3,600 tons full load.

- BAP Palacios (1952) DM-73 ex-HMS Diana Purchased by Peru 1969 and major reconstruction in UK 1970–73, commissioned by Peruvian Navy February 1973, squid and associated sonar removed 1975–76 and helicopter landing deck put in its place, Refit 1978–79 removed aft twin 4.5-in gun and replaced with hangar for helicopter. Change was later reverted. Disposed of 1993.
- BAP Ferré (1949) DM-74 ex-HMS Decoy Purchased by Peru 1969 and major reconstruction in UK 1970–73, commissioned by Peruvian Navy April 1973, squid and associated sonar removed 1975–76 and helicopter landing deck put in its place, Refit 1978–79 removed aft twin 4.5-in gun and replaced with hangar for helicopter. Change was later reverted. Disposed of 2007.

Holland class, 2,765 tons full load.

- BAP García y García (1953) DD-75 ex-HNLMS Holland. Purchased and commissioned January 1978. Deleted 1986.

ex-Dutch Friesland class, 3,070 tons full load.

- BAP Colonel Bolognesi (1955) DD-70 ex-HNLMS Overijssel Commissioned June 1982, paid off and used for spares, deleted 1990.
- BAP Castilla (1956) DD-71 ex-HNLMS Utrecht Commissioned October 1980, paid off and used for spares, deleted 1990.
- BAP Guise (1955) DD-72 ex-HNLMS Drenthe Taken over June 1981, and commissioned September 1981, deleted 1985.
- BAP Capitan Quiñones (1955) DD-76 ex-HNLMS Limburg (1980) Later renamed Quiñones. Commissioned June 1980, deleted 1991.
- BAP Villar (1956) DD-77 ex-HNLMS Amsterdam Commissioned May 1980, deleted 1991.
- BAP Gálvez (1954) DD-78 ex-HNLMS Groningen Commissioned March 1981, deleted 1991.
- BAP Diez Canseco (1956) DD-79 ex-HNLMS Rotterdam Commissioned June 1981, deleted 1991.

=== Frigates ===
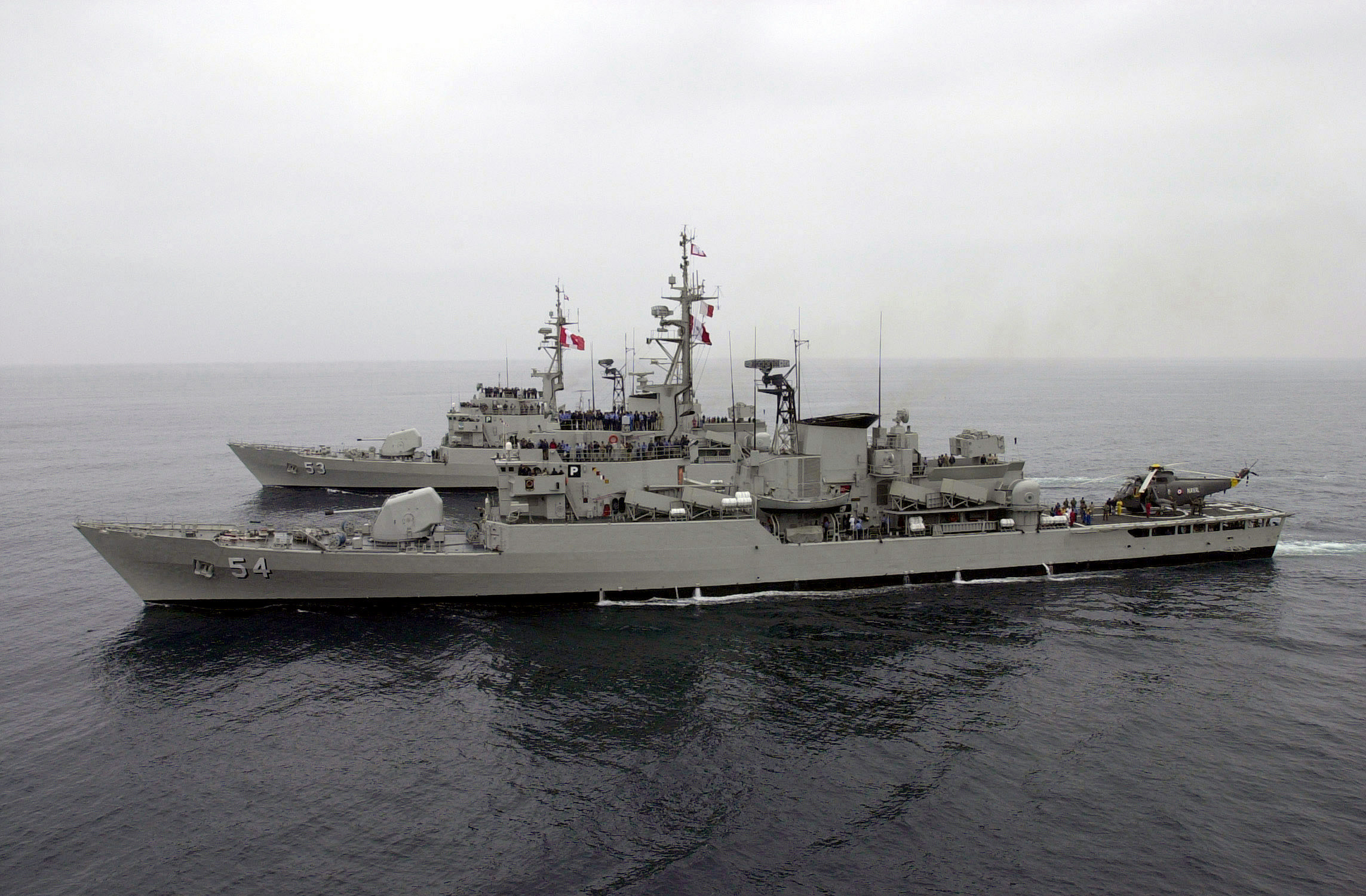
BAP Montero (FM-53) and BAP Mariategui (FM-54), 24 October 2001.

ex-US Cannon-class destroyer escorts (sometimes known as Bostwick class), 1,900 tons full load.

- BAP Aguirre (1942) D-1, in 1959 DE-1, in 1960 DE-62. ex-USS Waterman. Transferred to Peru 26 October 1951 under Mutual Defense Assistance Program. Original triple torpedo tube mounting removed. Reconditioned in US, arrived in Peru 24 May 1952. According to Conways, sunk in 1974 in Exocet test, though Janes in 1982 said that the hulk of ex-Aguirre was stripped of armament and some upperworks and was serving as floating electrical power station.
- BAP Castilla (1943) D-2, in 1959 DE-2, in 1960 DE-61. ex-USS Bangust. Transferred to Peru 26 October 1951 under Mutual Defense Assistance Program. Original triple torpedo tube mounting removed. Reconditioned in US, arrived in Peru 24 May 1952. By 1977 she was a pontoon ship at Iquitos serving as a floating training centre. Struck off 1979. The hulk of ex-Castilla was in use as a training ship at Iquitos in 1982.
- BAP Rodríguez (1943) D-3, in 1959 DE-3, in 1960 DE-63 ex-USS Weaver. Transferred to Peru 26 October 1951 under Mutual Defense Assistance Program. Original triple torpedo tube mounting removed. Reconditioned in US, arrived in Peru 24 May 1952. Struck off 1979. Rodríguez was in use as a submarine accommodation ship in 1982.

ex-US Tacoma class, 2,415 tons full load.

- BAP Teniente Gálvez (1943) F1. ex-USS Woonsocket Purchased 1948 and initially known as Teniente Gálvez, but by 1954 or 1955 as Gálvez. Overhauled in US 1952. Discarded 1961 and broken up.

ex-Canadian River class 2,360 tons full load.

- BAP Teniente Palacios (1943) F-2, in 1959 FE-2, in 1960 FE-65. ex-HMCS St. Pierre Purchased 1947, and initially known as Teniente Palacios, but by 1954 or 1955 as Palacios, modernised with new guns and fire control in US 1952, discarded 1966.
- BAP Teniente Ferré (1944) F-3, in 1959 FE-3, in 1960 FE-66. ex-HMCS Poundmaker (1947–1966) Purchased 1947, and initially known as Teniente Ferré, but by 1954 or 1955 as Ferré, modernised with new guns and fire control in US 1952, discarded 1966.

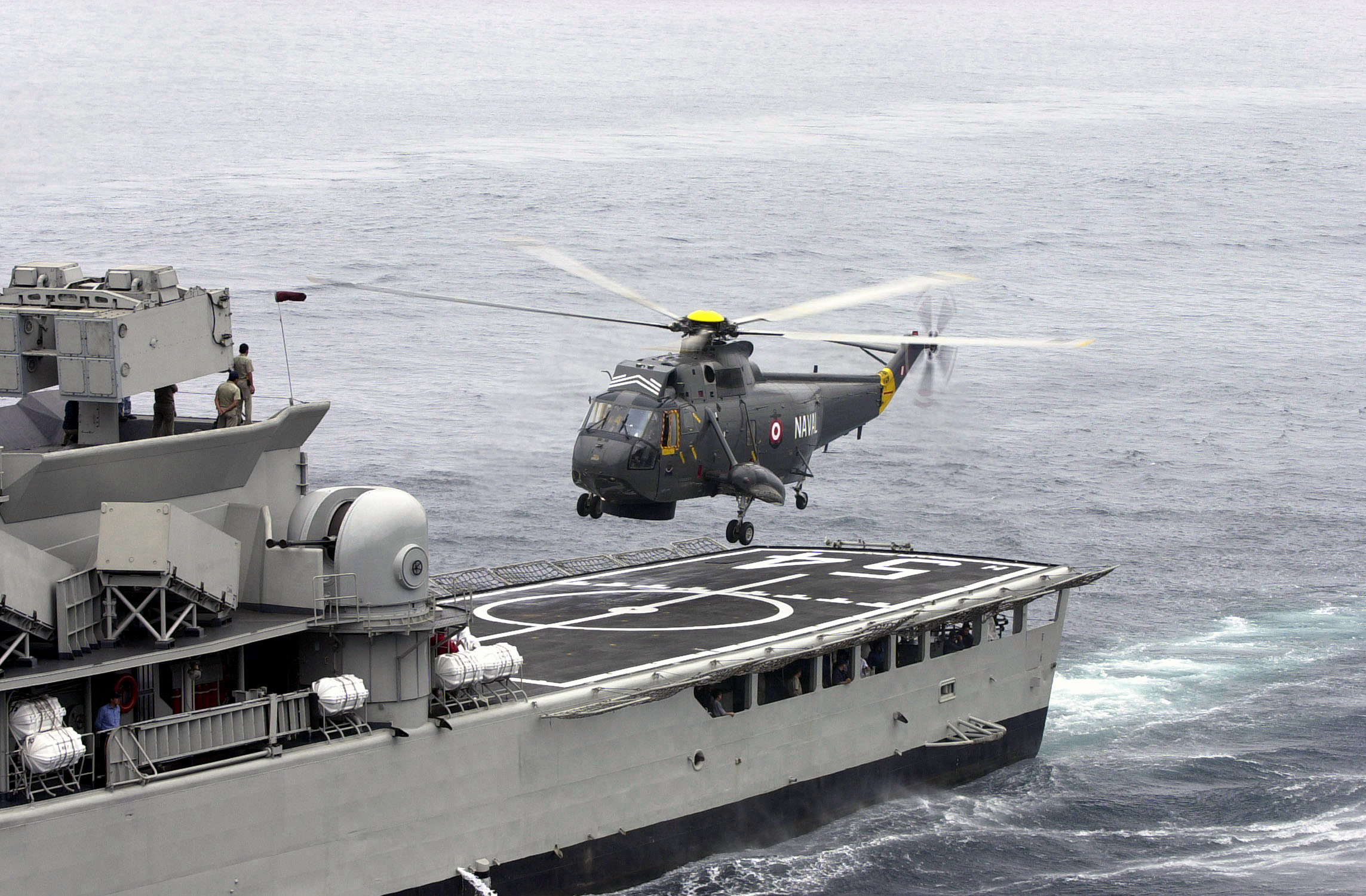
ASH-3D Sea King landing on BAP Mariátegui (FM-54), 24 October 2001.

Carvajal (modified Lupo) class, 2,500 tons full load.

- BAP Carvajal (1976) FM-51 Commissioned 5 February 1979, deck extension to allow it to operate ASH-3D Sea King from the deck fitted 1998, fitted with air search radar from Almirante Grau 2003, still in service.
- BAP Villavisencio (1978) FM-52 Commissioned 25 June 1979, helicopter in-flight refuelling facilities for ASH-3D Sea King fitted 1989, still in service.
- BAP Montero (1982) FM-53 Commissioned 25 July 1984, helicopter in-flight refuelling facilities for ASH-3D Sea King fitted 1989, still in service.
- BAP Mariátegui (1984) FM-54 Commissioned 10 October 1987, deck extension to allow it to operate ASH-3D Sea King from the deck fitted 1998, still in service.

ex-Italian Lupo class, 2,500 tons full load.

- BAP Aguirre (1979) FM-55 ex-MM Orsa ex-F-567. Transferred 3 November 2004 and refitted at Muggianp for 8 months, arrived Callao mid-2005. Still in service.
- BAP Palacios (1976) FM-56 ex-MMLupo ex-F-564. Transferred 3 November 2004 and refitted at Muggianp for 8 months, arrived Callao mid-2005. Still in service.
- BAP Bolognesi (1978) FM-57 ex-MM Perseo ex-F-566. Transferred 28 October 2005, commissioned 23 January 2006, arrived Callao 18 August 2006. Still in service.
- BAP Quiñones (1977) FM-58 ex-MM Sagitario ex-F-565. Transferred 28 October 2005, commissioned 23 January 2006, arrived Callao 20 January 2007. Still in service.

=== Corvettes ===
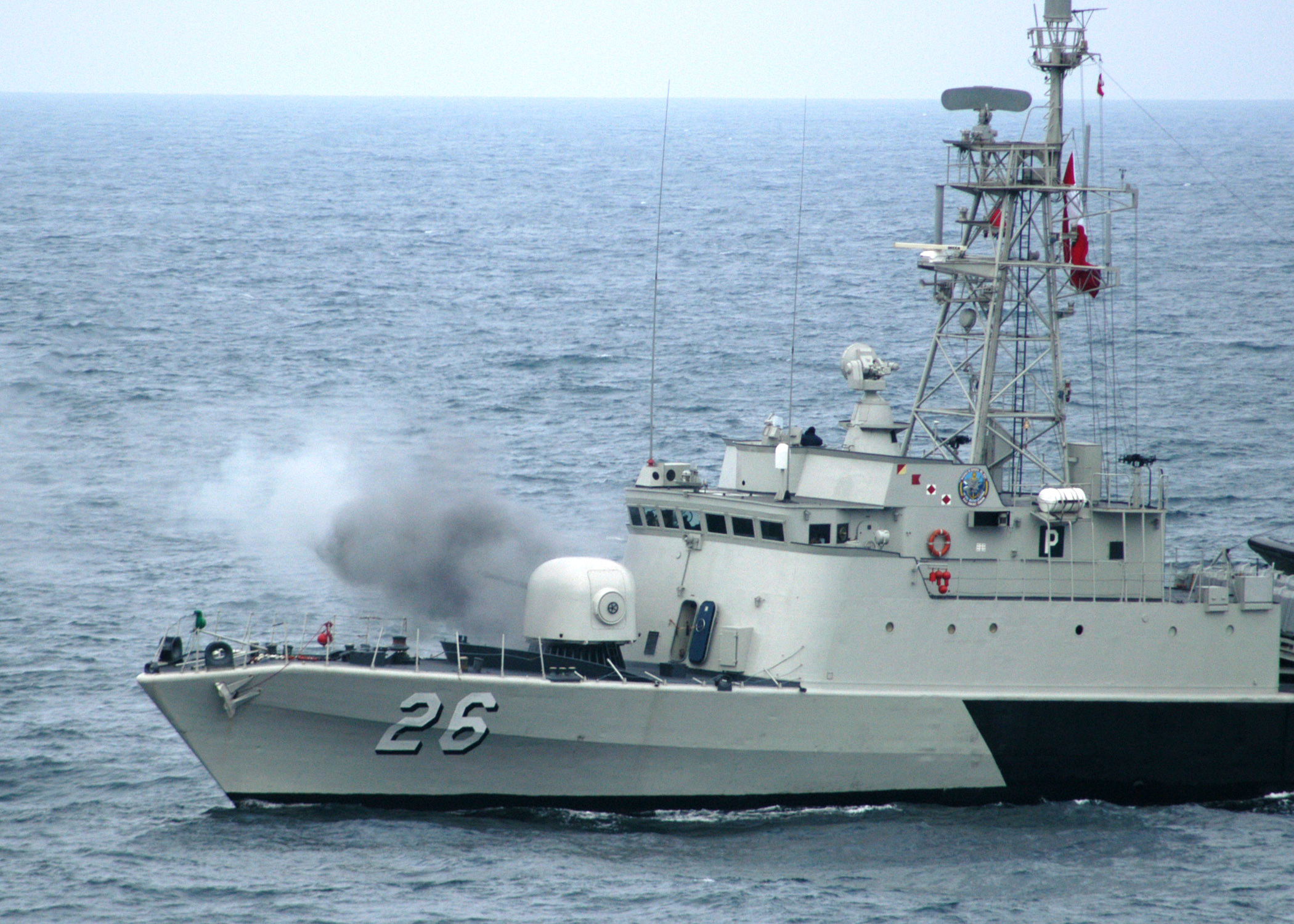
BAP Sánchez Carrión (CM-26).

PR-72P class, 560 tons full load.

- BAP Velarde (1978) CM-21 Ordered 1976, commissioned 25 July 1980. Still in service 2008.
- BAP Santillana (1978) CM-22 Ordered 1976, commissioned 25 July 1980. Still in service 2008.
- BAP De los Heros (1979) CM-23 Ordered 1976, commissioned 17 November 1980. Still in service 2008.
- BAP Herrera (1979) CM-24 Ordered 1976, commissioned 10 February 1981. Still in service 2008.
- BAP Larrea (1979) CM-25 Ordered 1976, commissioned 16 June 1981. Still in service 2008.
- BAP Sánchez Carrión (1979) CM-26 Ordered 1976, commissioned 14 September 1981. Still in service 2008.

ex-Korean Pohang class corvette, 1220 tons full load.

- BAP Ferre (1985) CM-27 ex ROKSGyeongju (PCC-758). Transferred and commissioned in 2015.
- BAP Guise (1987) CM-28 ex ROSKS Suncheon (PCC-767). Transferred and commissioned in 2021.

=== Submarines ===
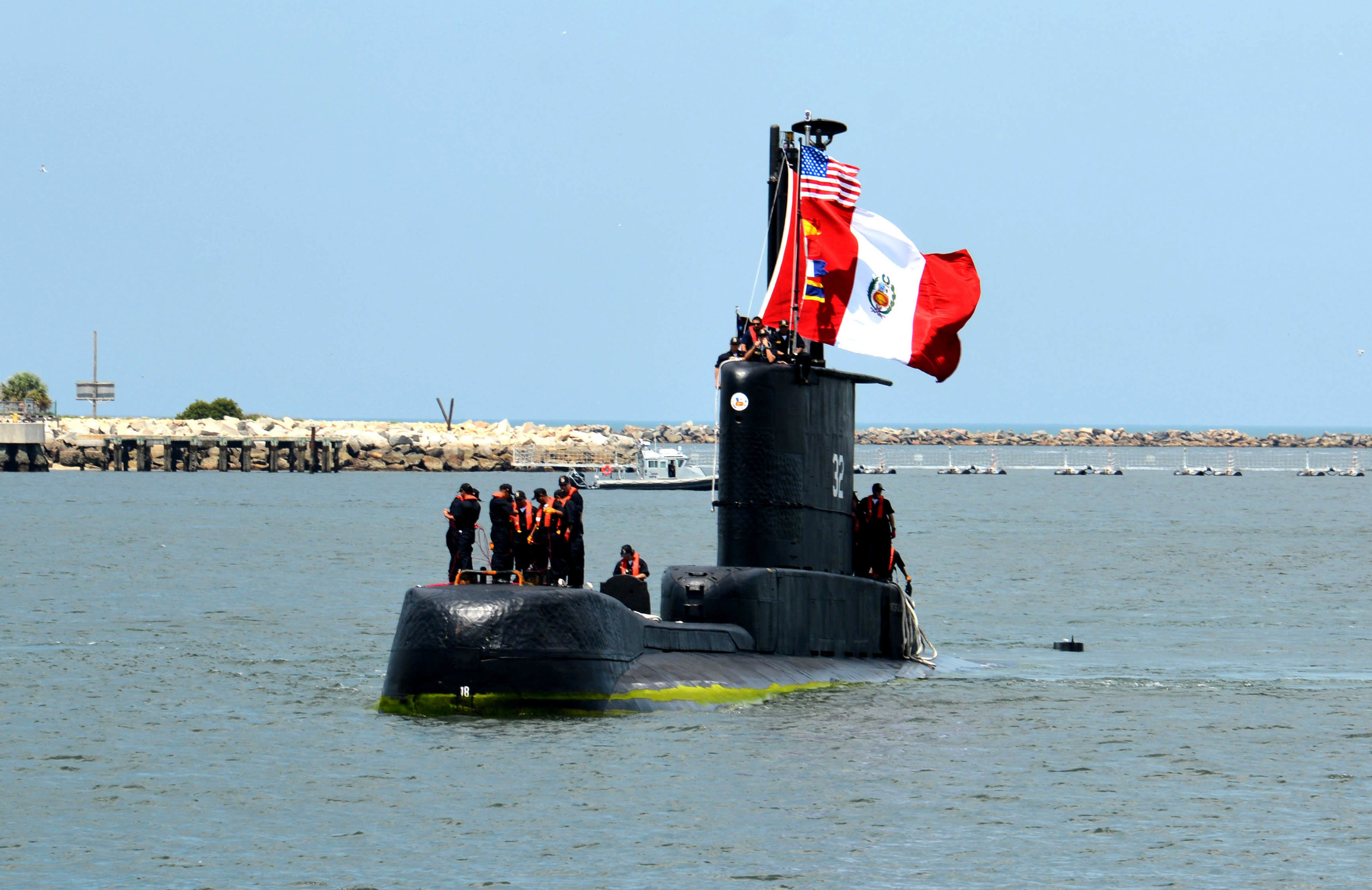
BAP Antofagasta (SS-32).

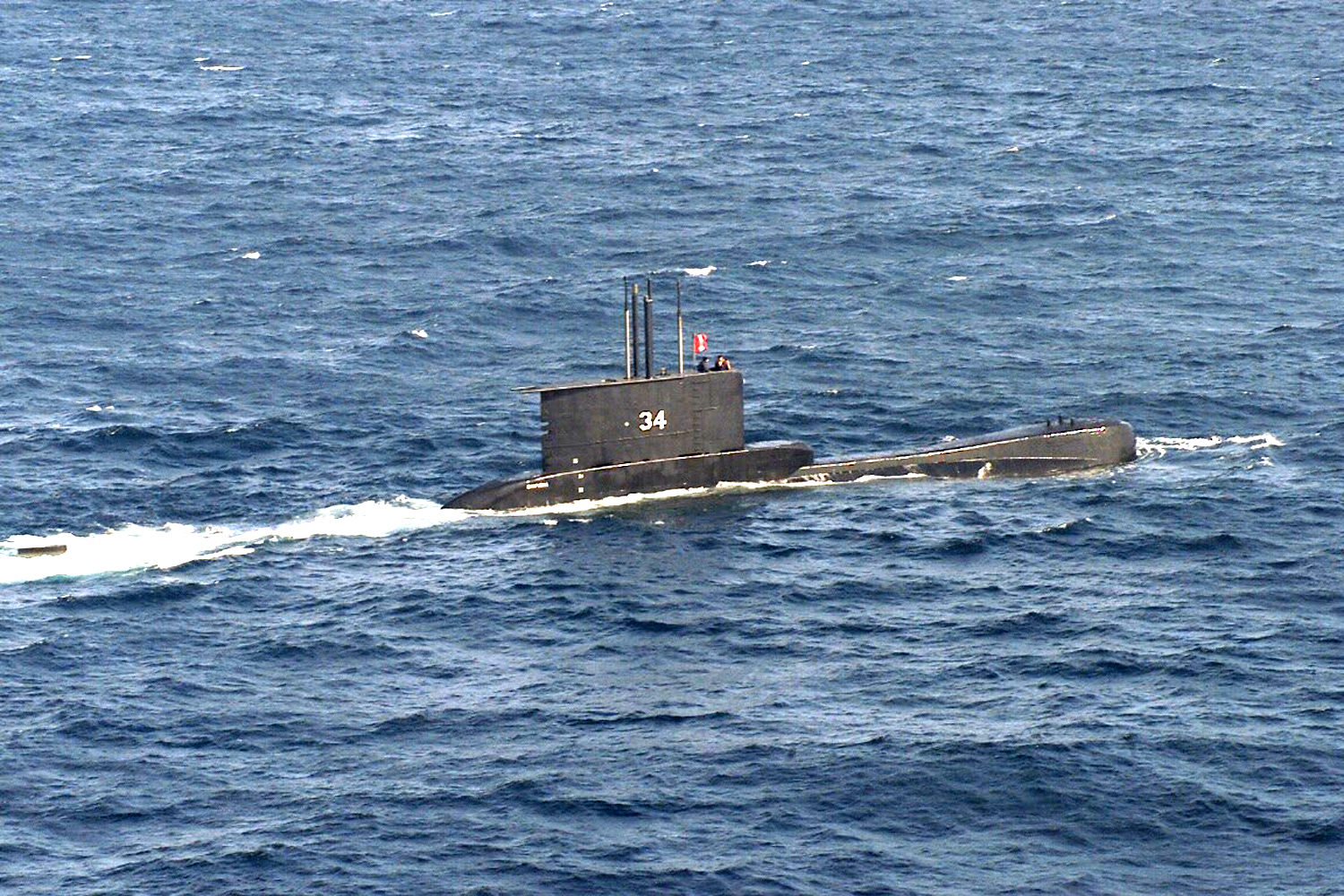
BAP Chipana (SS-34).

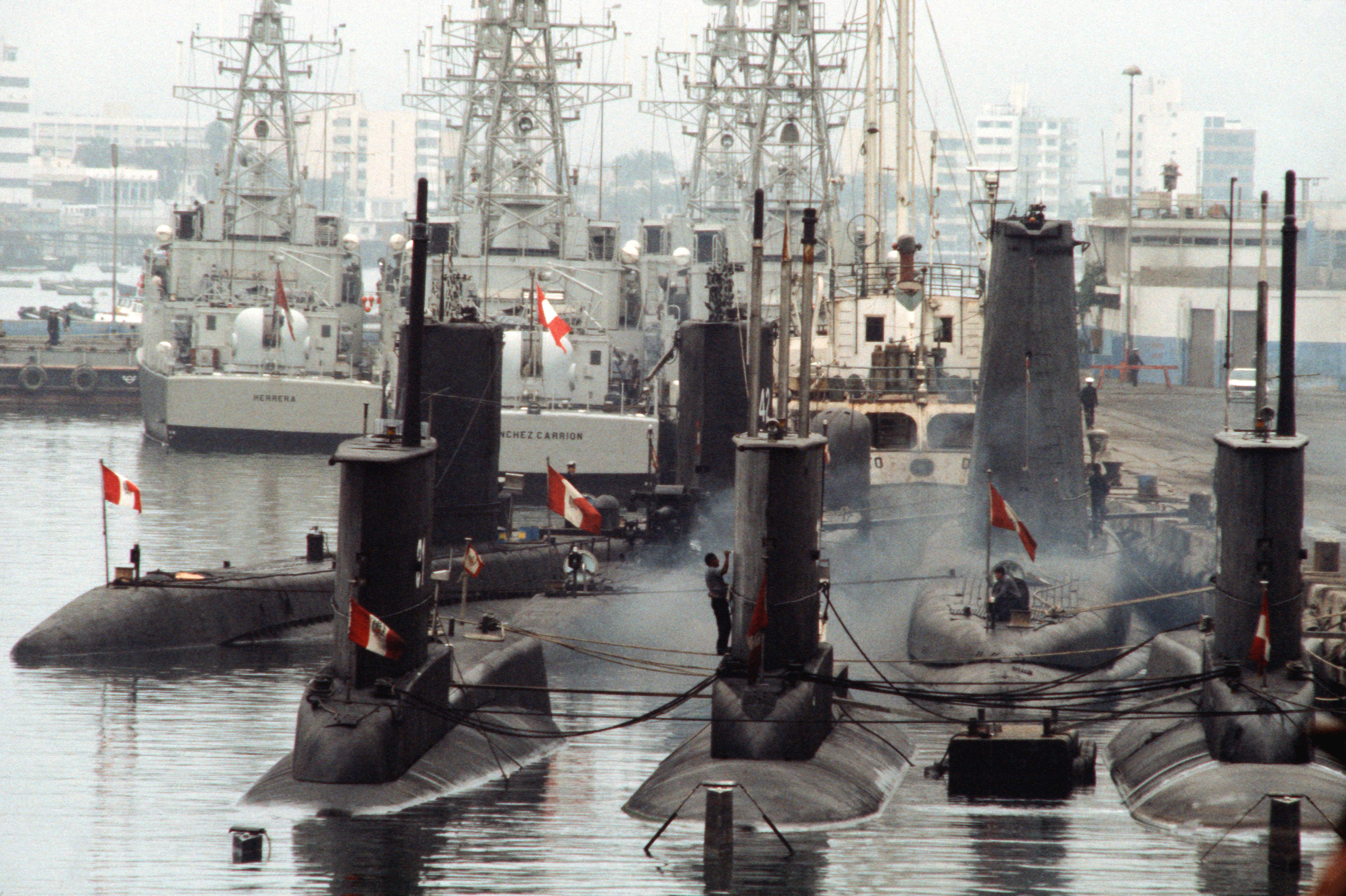
Submarines tied up at Callao naval base.

Ferré class Laubeuf-type 300/400 tons.

- Ferré (1912) Stricken 1919.
- Palacios (1913) Stricken 1919.

R class 576/682 tons (or 576/755 tons).

- BAP R-1 (1926) Refitted at builder's yard in 1935; overhauled in US in 1950. Renamed Islay 1957, stricken 1960.
- BAP R-2 (1926) Refitted at builder's yard in 1935; overhauled in US in 1950. Renamed Casma 1957, stricken 1960.
- BAP R-3 (1928) Delivered 1928, refitted at builder's yard in 1936; overhauled in US in 1950, renamed Pacocha 1957, stricken 1960.
- BAP R-4 (1928) Delivered 1928, refitted at builder's yard in 1936; overhauled in US in 1950, renamed Arica 1957, stricken 1960.
- R-5 projected in 1926, but not funded.
- R-6 projected in 1926, but not funded.

Abtao class , initially known as the Lobo class, modified US Mackerel class, 825 tons standard, 1,400 tons submerged.

- BAP Dos de Mayo (1954) Pennant number 6, from 1959 SS-1, from 1960 SS-41. Completed June 1954, initially known as Lobo, but renamed Dos de Mayo in April 1957. Discarded 1999.
- BAP Abtao (1953) Pennant number 5, from 1959 SS-2, from 1960 SS-42. Completed February 1954, initially known as Tiburon, but renamed Abtao in April 1957. Decommissioned 1998 and became museum 2004.
- BAP Angamos (1957) Pennant number 7, from 1959 SS-3, from 1960 SS-43. Completed July 1957, initially known as Atun, but renamed Angamos in April 1957. Discarded 1990.
- BAP Iquique (1957) Pennant number 8, from 1959 SS-4, from 1960 SS-44. Completed October 1957, initially known as Merlin, but renamed Iquique in April 1957. Discarded 1993.

Guppy 1A class

- BAP Pacocha (SS-48) ex USS Atule (1974–1992)
- BAP La Pedrera (SS-49) ex USS Sea Poacher (1974–1991)

Type 209/1100 class

- BAP Islay (SS-35) (1974-in service)
- BAP Arica (SS-36) (1975-in service)

Type 209/1200 class

- BAP Angamos (SS-31) ex BAP Casma (1980-in service)
- BAP Antofagasta (SS-32) (1981-in service)
- BAP Pisagua (SS-33) ex BAP Blume (1983-in service)
- BAP Chipana (SS-34) ex BAP Pisagua (1982-in service)

=== River gunboats ===
America class Amazon river gunboat, 240 tons, with 2 × 3-pdr (65mm).

- America (1904) Still exists today, moored in Iquitos as part of the Museum of Historic Boats – named after America Nunez Flores de Millan.

Napo class Amazon river gunboat, 98 tons.

- Napo (1920) – Extant 1947

Loreto class 250 tons.

- BAP Loreto (1934) CF-404, ex-CF-12.
- BAP Amazonas (1934) CF-403 ex-CF-11.

Marañón class 365 tons.

- BAP Marañón (1951) CF-401 ex-CF-13.
- BAP Ucayali (1951) CF-402 ex-CF-14.

Clavero class

- BAP Clavero (CF-15)
- BAP Putumayo (CF-16)

=== Amphibious warfare vessels ===
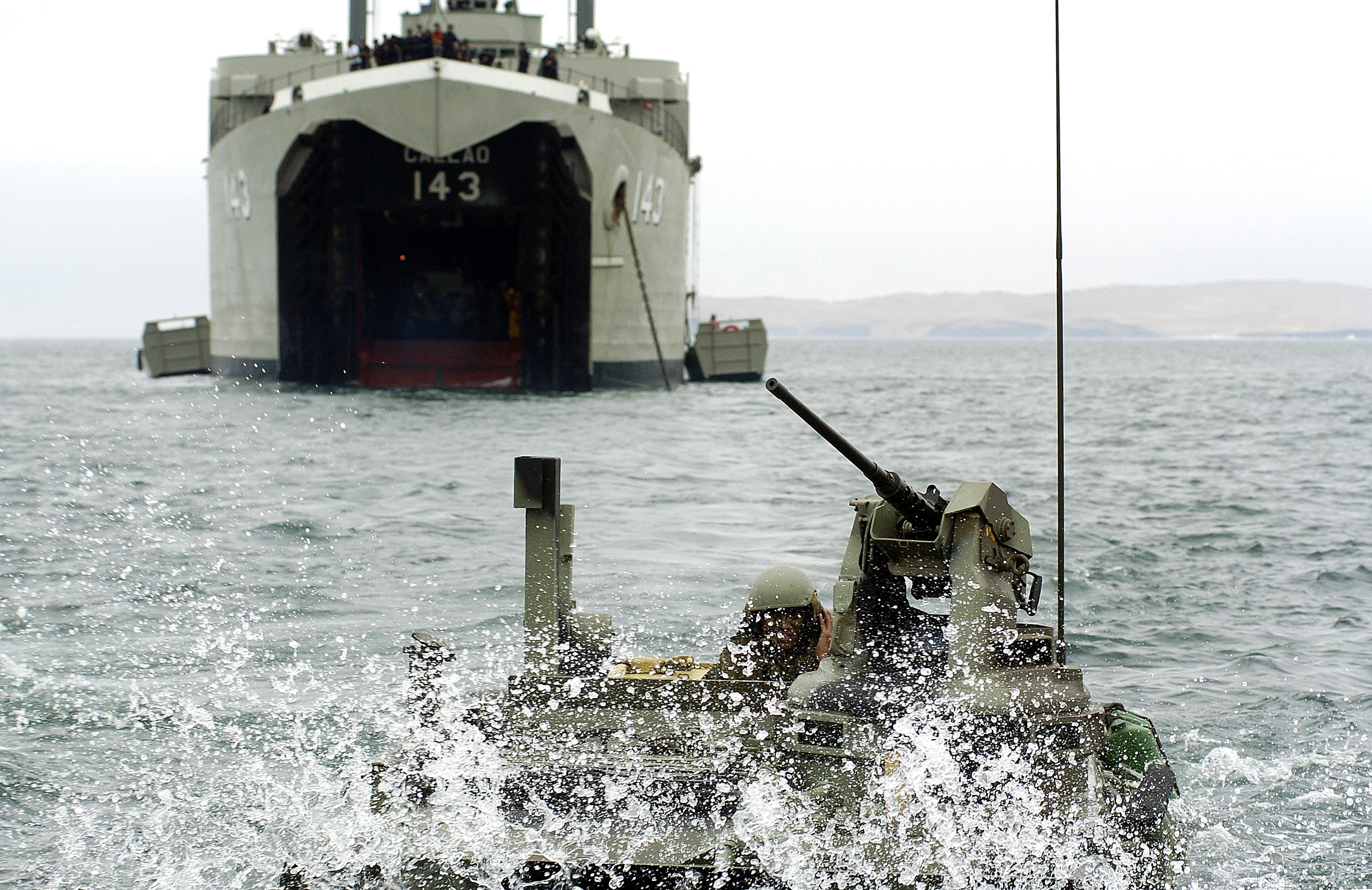
Naval Infantry coming ashore from BAP Callao (DT-143).

Ex-US LST 1–510 class landing ships, 3,640 tons full load.

- BAP Chimbote LT-34 (1943) ex-m/s Rawhiti, ex-US LST-283, later renumbered DT-142. Sold to Peru by a British firm 1951. Deleted c. 1984.

Ex-US LST 511–1152 class landing ships, 4,080 tons full load.

- BAP Paita (1943) LT-35 ex-USS Burnett County LST-512, acquired by Peru in 1957. Employed as a training ship for the Peruvian Naval Academy. Later renumbered DT-141. By the early 1980s was operating helicopters from upper deck amidships. Deleted 1983.
- BAP Salaverry () DT-140 ex m/s Iquitos, ex-m/s Carpine, ex-US LST??. Acquired 1977 from a commercial firm, deleted 1986.

ex-US LSM type medium landing ships, 913 tons full load.

- Lomas (1945) 36, ex-US LSM-396. Transferred to Peru 1959, deleted 1986.
- Atico (1945) 37, ex-US LSM-554. Transferred to Peru 1959, deleted 1986.

ex-US Terrebonne Parish class landing ships, 5,800 tons full load.

- BAP Paita DT-141 (1955) ex-USS Walworth County LST-1164. Leased from US Navy for five years on 7 August 1984; recommissioned 4 March 1985; leased later extended to 1994. She was in service as a seagoing vessel in February 2008.
- BAP Pisco DT-142 (1953) ex-USS Waldo County LST-1163. Leased from US Navy for five years on 7 August 1984; recommissioned 4 March 1985; leased later extended to 1994. As of 1992 Pisco was non-operational providing spares for the others. However she was in service as a seagoing vessel in February 2008.
- BAP Callao DT-143 (1953?) ex-USS Washoe County LST-1165. Leased from US Navy for five years on 7 August 1984; recommissioned 4 March 1985; leased later extended to 1994. Discarded as target ship for training 2021.
- BAP Eten DT-144 (1953?) ex-USS Traverse County LST-1160. Leased from US Navy for five years on 7 August 1984; recommissioned 4 March 1985; leased later extended to 1994. Still in service.

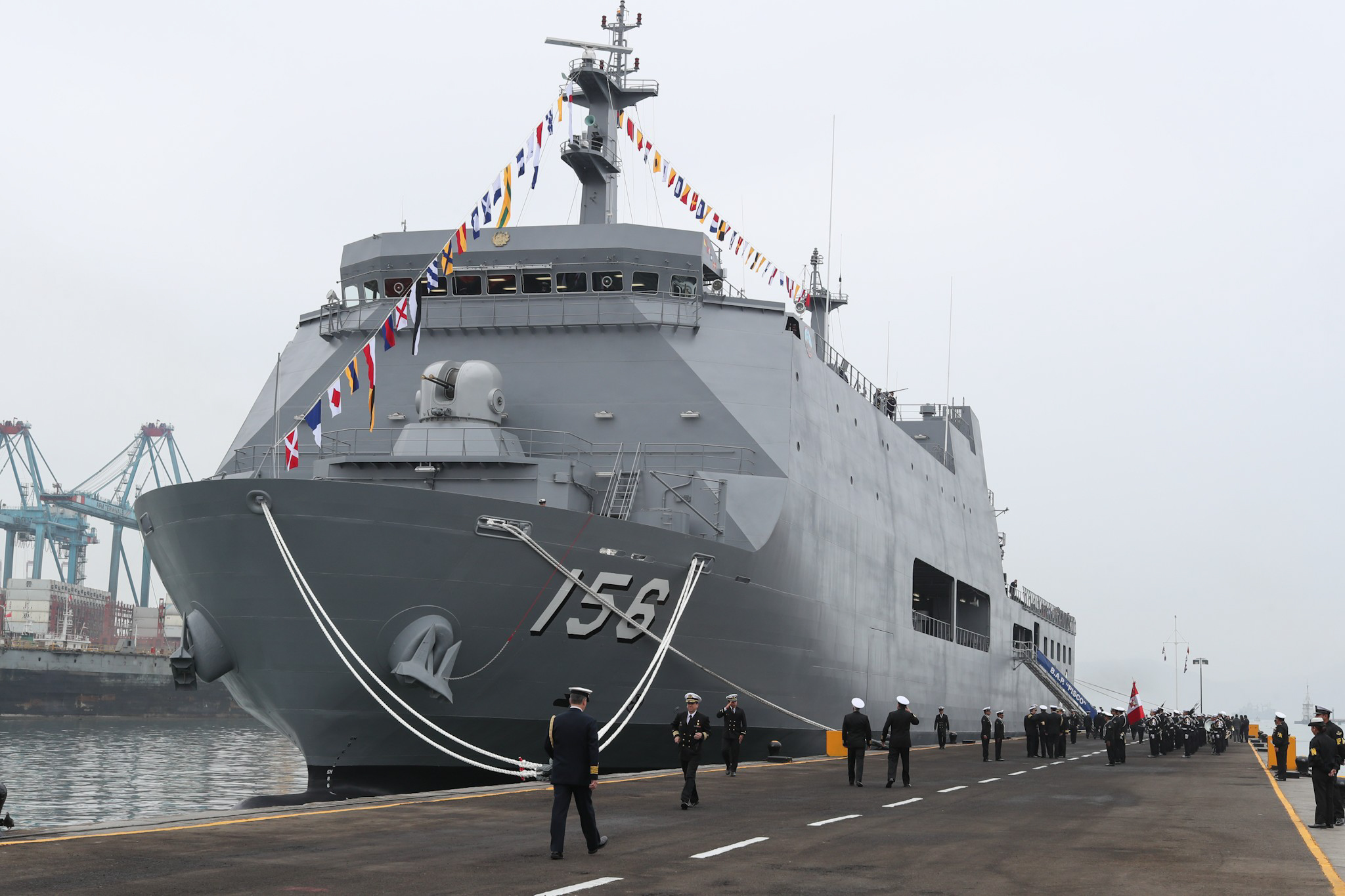
BAP Pisco AMP-156

Makassar-class landing platform dock, 8,400 full load.

- BAP Pisco AMP-156 (2015)
- BAP Paita AMP-157 (2022) under construction in SIMA Perú.

=== Oilers ===
Pariñas class Thornycroft type oiler, 2820 GRT

- Pariñas (1921) ex-Sjömand, scrapped 1961.

Cabo Blanco class fleet supply ship and oiler.

- Cabo Blanco () Commissioned 1946, ex-Mariscal Castilla, ex-Preserver, scrapped 1961.

Organos class Canadian type oiler.

- Organos () ex-Olaya scrapped 1961.

Talara-class oiler, 7,000 tons.

- Talara ATP-53 (1952/3) laid down 1953, completed 1955. Probably retired 1970s.

Sechura-class support oilers 8,700 tons full load.

- Sechura ATP-54 (1954) laid down 1952, completed 1955, commissioned 1956. Out of service some time before 1978.
- Zorritos ATP-159 (1958) ex-ATP-58, laid down 1955, commissioned 1959.
- Lobitos ATP-158 (1965) commissioned 1966. Out of service before 1997.

Mollendo-class oiler, 25,670 full load.

- Mollendo (1962) ATP-151 purchased 1967, by 1978 was in reserve.

Parinas-class oiler, 13,600 tons full load.

- Parinas ATP-155 (1967)
- Pimental ATP-156 (1968)

Talara-class oiler, 30,000 tons full load.

- BAP Talara ATP-152 (1976)
- BAP Bayovar ATP-??? (1977) Laid down 9 July 1976, launched 18 July 1977; originally ordered by the state oil company Petroperu, and transferred to the Navy whilst building. Sold back to Petroperu in 1979 and renamed Pavayacu.

Bayovar-class freighting tanker, 107,320 tons full load.

- BAP Bayovar ATP-150 (1976) ex-m/s Loreto II, ex-m/s St Vincent. Purchased by Peruvian Navy from Peruvian civil company 1986.

ex-US Sealift-class transport oilers, 33,000 full load.

- BAP Lobitos ATP-153 ex-USNS Sealift Caribbean (1974?) Transferred to the Peruvian Navy 18 May 1997.

ex-Russian tankers, Grigoriy Nesterenko type transport oilers, 28,610 tonnes dwt.

- BAP Bayovar (1986?) ATP-154 ex-m/s Petr Schmidt. Bayovar arrived in Callao on 16 February 2007, commissioned Peruvian Navy on 15 April 2007.
- BAP Zorritos (1987?) ATP-155 ex-m/s Grigoriy Nesterenko. Zorritos arrived at Callao on 15 March 2007, commissioned Peruvian Navy on 15 April 2007.

=== Transports ===
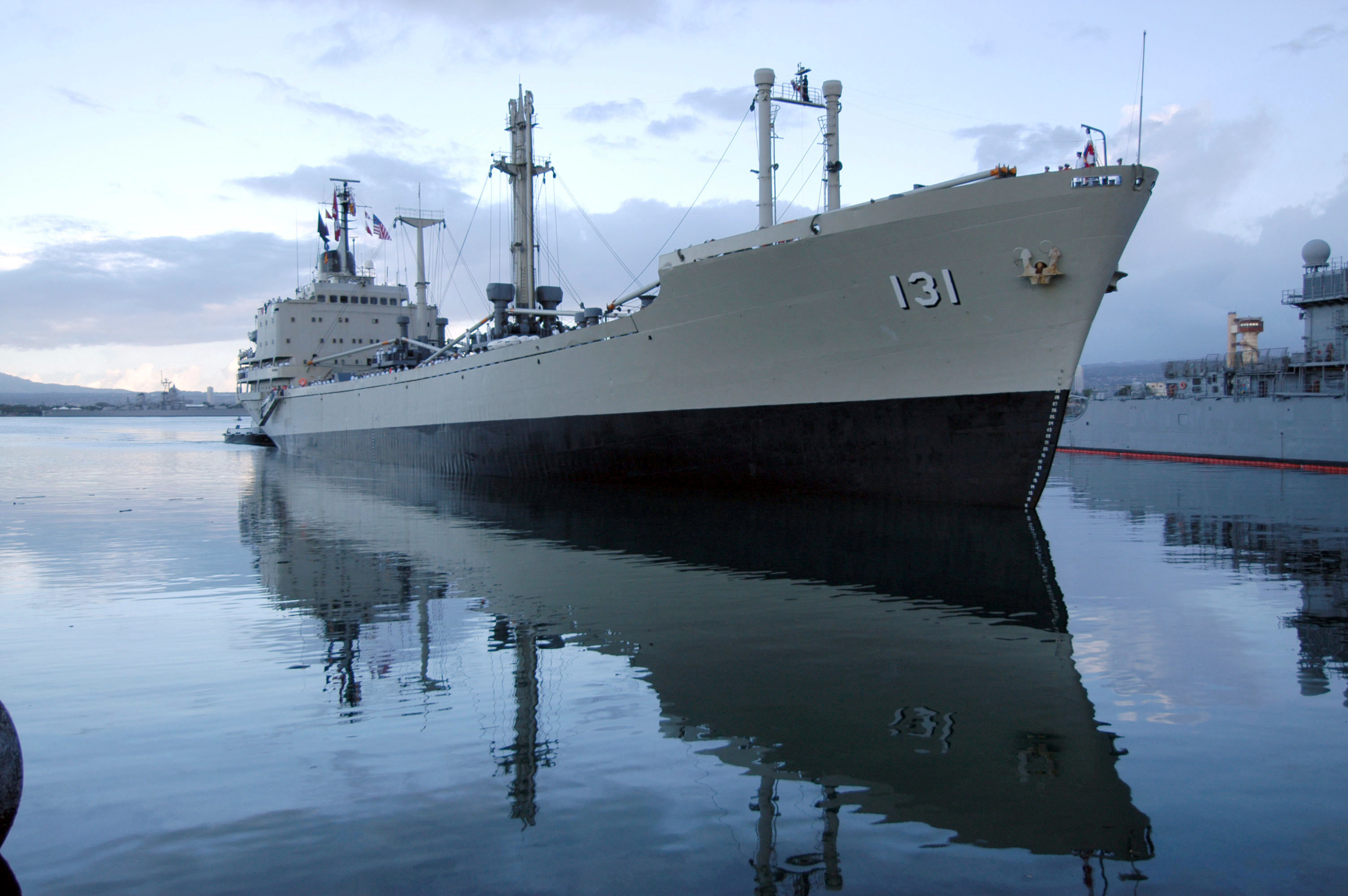
BAP Mollendo (ATC-131).

Rimac class 6,848 GRT.

- Rimac (1907) ex-Eten, ex-Rhakotis, scrapped 1960.

Callao class 7,790 tons full load.

- Callao ATC-32 (1938) Former Hamburg-America liner Monserrate, Salved and seized by Peru 1 April 1941, after scuttled by Germans.

Ilo class 8,385 tons full load.

- Ilo ATC-33 (1945) acquired 1959, ex-m/s Norlindo, 1962 photo showed '133' painted as pennant number.

ex-US AKA type attack cargo-ship, 14,225 tons full load.

- Independencia (1941) ex-USS Beatrix AKA-3, ex-Raven AKA-20, transferred (leased) to Peru February 1963 under military aid programme. In the 1970s it was used as a training ship for midshipmen.

Mollendo class 18.400 tons full load.

- BAP Mollendo (1970) ATC-131 Launched 15 July 1970, commissioned 25 May 1972. ex BAP Ilo. Still in service.
- Rimac (1971) In 1973, transferred from the navy to the State Shipping Company (CPV) for commercial use.

=== Tugs ===
ex-US ??? class, 132 tons.

- Franco ARB-124 (1938?) ex-USS Menewa YTM-2, transferred to Peru March 1947, still in service 1992.

ex-US Apache (or Cherokee) class fleet ocean tug, 1,675 tons full load.

- Guardián Ríos ARB-123 (1943) (also known as Ríos) ex-USS Pinto ATF-90, transferred to Peru 1960 on loan, and delivered January 1961, sold to Peru 17 May 1974. Still in service in 1992.

ex-US ??? class wooden tugs, 852 tons.

- Olya (1942?) ex-USS ATR-25, purchased 1947?, scrapped 1961.
- Selendon ARB-21 (1942) ex-Condestible Selendon, ex-USS ATR-31, purchased 1947. Disposed of in the mid-1960s to early 1970s.

ex-US Maricopa (orSotoyomo) class auxiliary ocean tug, 853 tons full load.

- Unanue AH-170 (1943) ex-ARB-136, ex-USS Wateree ATA-174, purchased from USA in November 1961 under military aid programme. Refitted in 1985 for operations in the Antarctic and then served as a survey and oceanographic survey ship.

Selendon class, 80 GRT.

- Selendon ARB-129 (1966?) commissioned 1967.
- Olaya ARB-128 (1966?) commissioned 1967.

Contraestre Navarro class river tug, 50 tons.

- Contraestre Navarro () added to the fleet February 1973, served in Amazon flotilla. No longer in service 1992.

Seven harbour tugs were in service in 1992:

- Mejia ARB-120
- Huerta ARB-121
- Dueñas ARB-126
- ARB-180
- ARB-181
- ARB-185
- ARB-186

=== Floating docks ===
- ADF-108 (1951) displacement 600 tons, still in service 1992.
- ADF-106 (1944) ex-ADF-111, ex-WY-19, ex-US AFDL-33 (or AFDL-3), transferred to Peru July 1959, displacement 1,900 tons, still in service 1992.
- ADF-107 () ex-ADF-112, ex-WY-20, ex-US ARD-8, transferred to Peru February 1961, displacement 5,200 tons, still in service 1992.
- ADF-109 (1979) displacement 18,000 tons, still in service 1992.
- ADF-110 (1991) displacement 4,500 tons.

=== Harbour tankers oil/water ===
ex-US YW/YO type 1,235 tons full load.

- Mantilla ACA-110 () ex-ACA-141, ex-US YW-122, loaned to Peru July (or March) 1963, sold to Peru 15 September 1979. Thought to be out of service.
- Noguera ACP-118 () ex-US YO-221, transferred to Peru January 1975. Thought to be still in service.
- Gauden ACP-119 () ex-US YO-171, transferred to Peru 20 January 1981. Thought to be still in service.
- Caloyeras ACA-111 () ex-US YW-128, transferred to Peru 26 January 1981. Still in service.

Amazon flotilla water barges acquired in 1972, 300 tons standard load(?), capacity 800 tons water.

- ABA-330 (1972) ex-ABA-091, still in service 1992.
- ABA-332 (1972) ex-ABA-113, still in service 1992.

=== Torpedo recovery vessels ===
San Lorenzo class, 65 tons full load.

- BAP San Lorenzo ART-322 (1980?) Shipped to Peru September 1981, still in service.

=== Hydrographic survey ships ===
ex-Dutch Carrasco class survey ships, 343 tons

- BAP Carrasco AH-171 (1956) ex HNLMS Abcoude Still in service.

ex-Dutch van Straelen class former inshore minesweepers converted to survey ship role, 169 tons full load.

- BAP Carrillo AH-175 (1959) ex-HNLMS van Hamel, acquired February 1985. Still in service.
- BAP Melo AH-176 (1959) ex-HNLMS van der Wel, acquired February 1985. Still in service.

Stiglich class survey ships, 220 tons. (Janes 1992–93 says 43 tons full load.)

- BAP Stiglich AH-172 (1980) ex-Rio Cillon. Transferred from Coast Guard. Still in service.

AEH-173 class inshore survey ship, 23 tons.

- BAP AEH-173 (1979) Presumably commissioned 1980. No longer in service.

AEH-174 class inshore survey ship, 30 tons. (Janes 1992–93 says 54 tons)

- BAP AEH-174 (1981) Still in service.

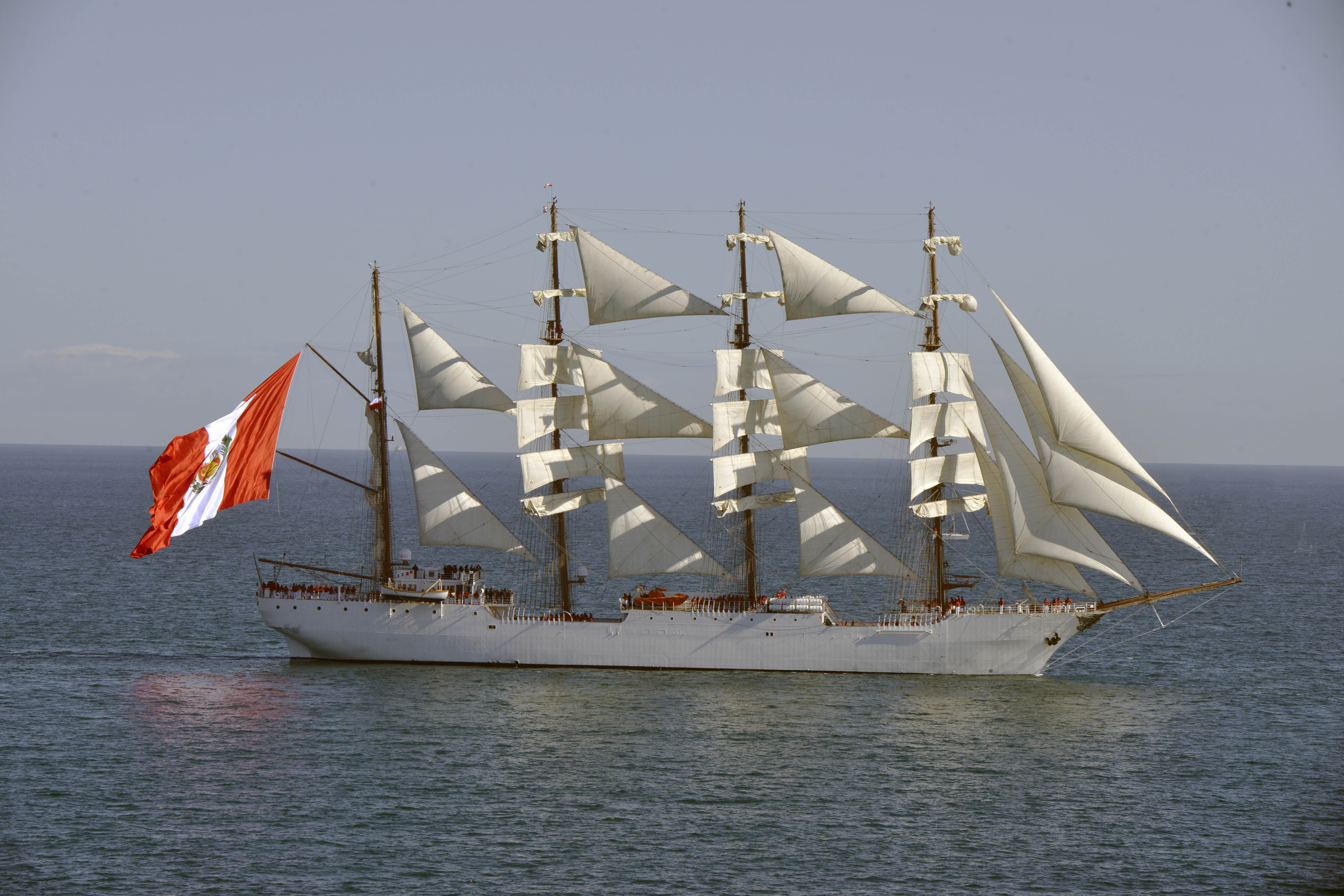
BAP Unión (BEV-161).

=== Sailing training ship ===
- BAP Unión BEV-161 (2015) It is a four-masted, steel-hulled, class "A" barque. She has been considered (as of the date it was commissioned) the largest sail vessel in Latin America.

=== Sailing yachts ===
- BAP Marte ALY-313 () Still in service.

== Sources ==
- Adamson, Robert E. & de St. Hubert, Christian (1991). "Question 12/89". Warship International. XXVIII (2): 199–205. ISSN 0043-0374.
- Baker III, Arthur D., The Naval Institute Guide to Combat Fleets of the World 2002–2003. Annapolis: Naval Institute Press, 2002.
- Ortiz Sotelo, Jorge, Apuntes para la historia de los submarinos peruanos. Lima: Biblioteca Nacional del Perú, 2001.
- Rodríguez Asti, John, Cruceros. Buques de la Marina de Guerra del Perú desde 1884. Lima: Dirección de Intereses Marítimos, 2000.
