= SS-42 =

SS-42, SS 42 or SS42 may refer to:

- BAP Abtao (SS-42), a submarine of the Peruvian Navy
- SS 42 the road over both the Mendelpass and the Tonale Pass in Italy
- USS L-3 (SS-42), a submarine of the United States Navy which saw service during World War I

== See also ==
- USS S-42 (SS-153), a submarine of the United States Navy which saw service during World War I
