= BAP Paita =

BAP Paita is the name of the following ships of the Peruvian Navy, named for the city of Paita:

- BAP Paita (LT-35), ex-USS Burnett County, a LST-491-class tank landing ship acquired in 1957, decommissioned in 1983
- BAP Paita (DT-141), ex-USS Walworth County, in service with Peru 1985–2012
- BAP Paita (AMP-157), a Makassar-class landing platform dock, commissioned in 2025.
