= Abtao-class submarine =

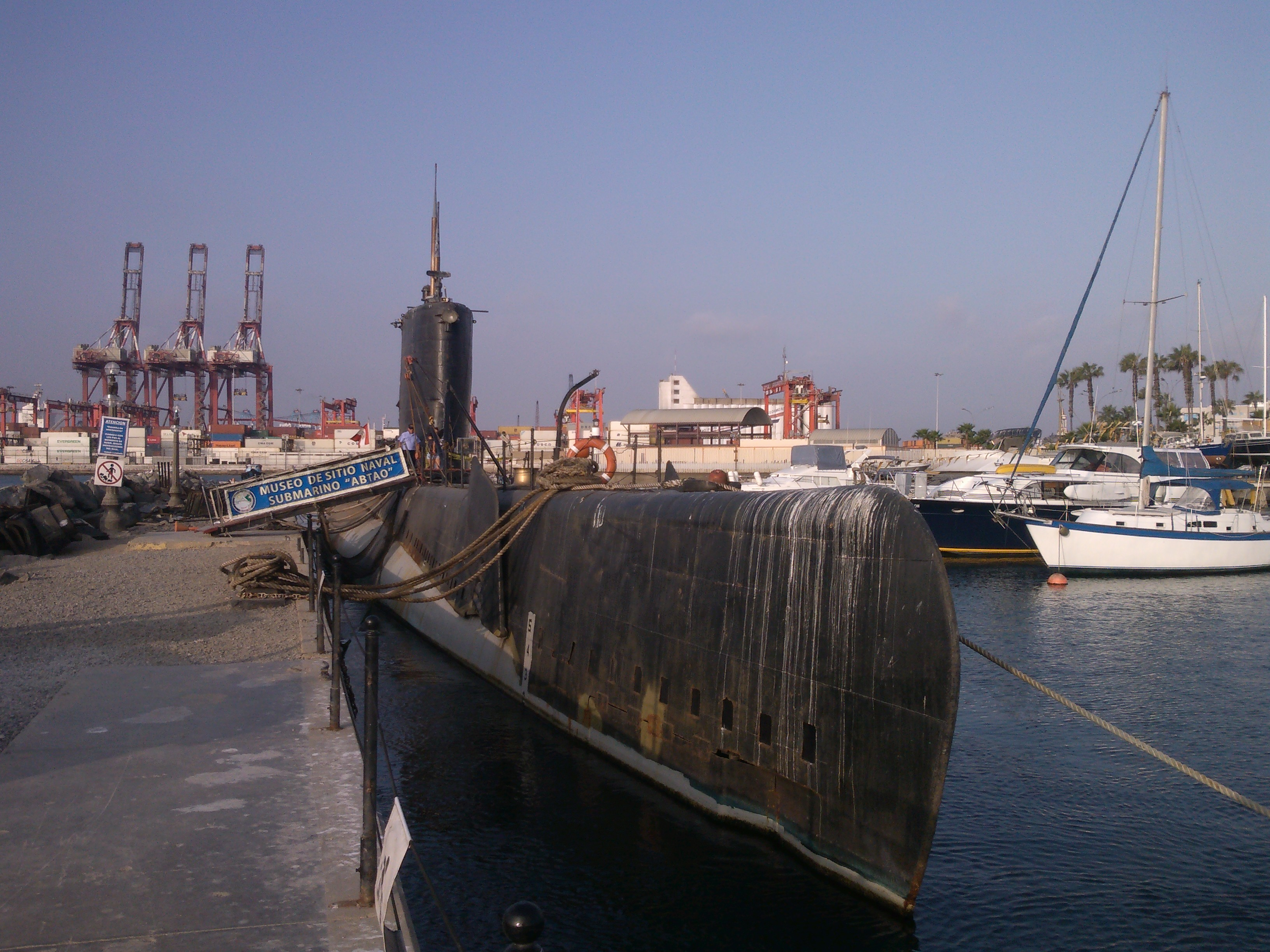
- BAP Abtao

Class overview
- Name: Abtao class
- Builders: Electric Boat, Groton, Connecticut
- Operators: Peruvian Navy
- Built: 1952–1957
- In commission: 1954–1999
- Completed: 4
- Retired: 4
- Preserved: 1

General characteristics
- Type: Submarine
- Displacement: 825 long tons (838 t) surfaced; 1,400 long tons (1,422 t) submerged
- Length: 243 ft (74.1 m) (oa)
- Beam: 22 ft (6.7 m)
- Draft: 14 ft (4.3 m)
- Propulsion: 2 diesel engines; 2 electric motors; 2 shafts, 2,400 bhp (1,800 kW)
- Speed: 16 knots (30 km/h; 18 mph) surfaced; 10 knots (19 km/h; 12 mph) submerged
- Range: 5,000 nmi (9,300 km; 5,800 mi) at 10 knots (snorkel)
- Endurance: 45 long tons (46 t) diesel fuel
- Complement: 40
- Sensors & processing systems: SS-2A radar; BQR-3 and BQA-1A sonar
- Armament: 6 × 21 in (533 mm) torpedo tubes (4 forward, 2 aft); 1 × 5 in (127 mm)/25 caliber gun (Abtao and Dos de Mayo only)

The Abtao class were four submarines of the Peruvian Navy that entered service between 1954 and 1957. They are also known as the Lobo class and the Dos de Mayo class and were constructed in the United States to a design based upon the United States Navy's Mackerel class. They were the last submarines to be constructed by the United States for the export market. All four submarines were powered by a diesel-electric system and armed with six 21-inch (533 mm) torpedo tubes. Two of the submarines also mounted a 5 in (127 mm)/25 caliber gun. The four submarines, initially named for animals, were all renamed in 1957 for famous Peruvian battles. Beginning in 1991, the submarines were taken out of service, with the last decommissioned in 1999. One, BAP Abtao, is a museum ship located in Lima, Peru.

== Design and description ==
The Abtao class were a modified version of the United States World War II Mackerel-class submarine design. They had a surfaced displacement of 825 long tons (838 t) and 1,400 long tons (1,422 t) submerged. They measured 243 ft (74.1 m) long overall with a beam of 22 ft (6.7 m) and a draft of 14 ft (4.3 m).

The submarines were powered by a diesel-electric system composed of two General Motors single-acting Type 278A diesel engines and two electric motors turning two props rated at 2,400 brake horsepower (1,800 kW). The Abtao class had a maximum speed of 16 knots (30 km/h; 18 mph) when surfaced and 10 knots (19 km/h; 12 mph) submerged. They carried 45 long tons (46 t) of diesel fuel and had a range of 5,000 nautical miles (9,300 km; 5,800 mi) at 10 knots at snorkel depth.

The class was armed with six 21-inch (533 mm) torpedo tubes with four located in the bow and two aft. Two vessels of the class, Abtao and Dos de Mayo, had a 5 in (127 mm)/25 caliber gun mounted abaft the sail. The gun is manually sighted. All four submarines were equipped with SS-2A radar and BQR-3 and BQA-1A sonar. In 1981, their batteries were replaced and following that, Thomson Sintra Eledone active/passive intercept sonar was installed. They had a complement of 40 officers and ratings.

== Ships ==
Abtao class
Pennant number (Initial)	Name	Builder	Pennant number (1959)	Pennant number (1960)	Laid down	Launched	Commissioned	Fate
6	Dos de Mayo (ex-Lobo)	Electric Boat, Groton, Connecticut	SS-1	SS-41	12 May 1952	6 February 1954	14 June 1954	Discarded 1999
5	Abtao (ex-Tiburón)	Electric Boat, Groton, Connecticut	SS-2	SS-42	12 May 1952	27 October 1953	20 February 1954	Decommissioned in 1998 and became a museum ship in 2004.
7	Angamos (ex-Atun)	Electric Boat, Groton, Connecticut	SS-3	SS-43	27 October 1955	5 February 1957	1 July 1957	Discarded 1990
8	Iquique (ex-Merlin)	Electric Boat, Groton, Connecticut	SS-4	SS-44	27 October 1955	5 February 1957	10 October 1957	Discarded 1993

== Construction and career ==
The Peruvian Navy initially ordered two submarines from Electric Boat on 8 December 1951 based on the United States Navy's Mackerel design. The first two were laid down at the yard in Groton, Connecticut on 12 May 1952 and two more on 27 October 1955. The four submarines were initially named for animals (Lobo, Tiburón, Atun and Merlin). The class was initially known as the Lobo class, and later as the Dos de Mayo class. However, a decree in April 1957 by the President of Peru, Manuel Prado Ugarteche, ordered that the names of the vessels be changed to those of famous Peruvian battles. Lobo became Dos de Mayo, Tiburón became Abtao, Atun became Angamos and Merlin became Iquique. Abtao was the first to launch in October 1953 and commission in February 1954 and Iquique the last to launch in February 1957 and commission in October 1957. They were the last submarines constructed by the United States for the export market.

Abtao and Dos de Mayo underwent a refit at Groton in 1965 and Angamos and Iquique in 1968. In August 1988, Abtao took part in the rescue of the crew of the submarine BAP Pacocha which had sunk after a collision with the fishing vessel Kiowa Maru. Angamos was taken out of service in 1990, followed by Iquique in 1993. Abtao was removed from service on 10 May 1999 and placed in reserve. The ship was removed from naval service in 2000 and converted into a museum ship in 2004 in Lima, Peru. Dos de Mayo was the last ship to be removed from service in 1999.
