= BAP Pacocha =

Submarine

History

Peru
- Name: Pacocha
- Laid down: 2 December 1943
- Launched: 6 March 1944
- Acquired: 31 July 1974, from the United States Navy
- Commissioned: 28 May 1974
- Identification: SS-48
- Fate: Rammed and sunk by a fishing trawler, 26 August 1988

General characteristics
- Class & type: Balao-class submarine
- Displacement: 1,830 tons (1,859 t) surfaced; 2,440 tons (2,479 t) submerged
- Length: 307 ft 7 in (93.75 m)
- Beam: 27 ft 4 in (8.33 m)
- Draft: 17 ft (5.2 m)
- Propulsion: 4 × Fairbanks-Morse Model 38D8-1/8 10 cylinder opposed piston diesel engines equipped with a snorkel, driving electrical generators; 2 × 126 cell Sargo II batteries; 4 × high-speed Elliott electric motors with reduction gears; two propellers
- Speed: Surfaced: 17.3 knots (32.0 km/h) maximum; 12.5 knots (23.2 km/h) cruising; Submerged: 15.0 knots (27.8 km/h) for 1/2-hour; 7.5 knots (13.9 km/h) snorkeling; 3.0 knots (5.6 km/h) cruising
- Range: 17,000 nm (28,000 km) surfaced at 11 knots (20 km/h)
- Endurance: 36 hours at 3 knots (5.6 km/h) submerged
- Test depth: 400 ft (120 m)
- Complement: 10 officers; 5 petty officers; 64–69 enlisted men
- Armament: 10 × 21 in (533 mm) torpedo tubes (six forward, four aft)

BAP Pacocha (SS-48) was a submarine of the Marina de Guerra del Perú (Peruvian Navy) named for the 1877 Battle of Pacocha, in which the Peruvian ironclad Huascar clashed with the Royal Navy. Formerly USS Atule (SS-403), a Balao-class submarine with a GUPPY IA upgrade, she had been sold to Peru and commissioned on 28 May 1974. She was rammed and sunk by a fishing trawler on 26 August 1988.

== Sinking and rescue operation ==
At 18:50 in the evening of 26 August 1988, Pacocha was transiting on the surface with the forward torpedo room and bridge hatches as well as the main induction valve open. Forty-nine men were aboard, including the squadron commander, to conduct an operational readiness inspection. About half an hour after sunset, ten minutes from Pacocha's expected arrival at the port of Callao, the 412-ton Japanese fishing trawler Kiowa Maru (also spelled Kyowa Maru and Hyowa Maru) rammed her in the aft port quarter. Kiowa Maru was equipped with an ice-breaker bow, with a sub-surface protrusion designed to penetrate and break apart what it struck. Pacocha sank quickly.

Four men died immediately in the collision and sinking: her commanding officer, Capitán de Fragata (Captain) Daniel Nieva Rodríguez, died securing the bridge access hatch; Teniente Segundo (Second Lieutenant) Luis Roca Sara and two enlisted men were trapped in flooded compartments and drowned. Twenty-three of her crew succeeded in abandoning ship.

In the sinking submarine, Teniente Primero (First Lieutenant) Roger Cotrina Alvarado secured the watertight forward torpedo room door and attempted to pressurize the compartment. He then tried to secure the forward torpedo room hatch. Instead, however, he had to force the hatch open to free a sailor whose leg was caught in the hatch due to the 40-degree up angle the Pacocha assumed before sinking. As the Pacocha began to capsize water rushed into the compartment, washing Lieutenant Cotrina down the ladder, and, fortunately, forcing the hatch door closed shortly afterwards.

Less than five minutes after the collision, Pacocha settled on the bottom at a depth of 140 feet (43 m) with a 9-degree up angle.

At 20:02, with Pacocha an hour overdue, the Peruvian Navy declared an emergency. Boats were dispatched to search along Pacocha's route. The tug Jennifer II was sent to rendezvous with Kiowa Maru and investigate. Some twenty minutes later, Contralmirante Guillermo Tirado, commander of the Submarine Flotilla, arrived at the Callao Naval Base, assumed command, and dispatched the submarine BAP Dos de Mayo (SS-41) to search.

At 20:30, the survivors trapped in Pacocha released their messenger buoy and attempted to call aft compartments on the sound-powered telephone. There was no response.

By 21:00, the crew of Jennifer II had confirmed that Kiowa Maru had collided with something, and radioed their report to the base. While that report was in progress, the survivors in Pacocha fired a red distress flare. The Navy immediately issued a call for rescue and salvage divers to report for duty. Rescue of the survivors on the surface began at once, and within an hour and a half, twenty survivors and three bodies were drawn from the water. Three enlisted men had died of hypothermia during the four hours they had spent in the 14 °C (57 °F) water.

Meanwhile, 22 survivors mustered in Pacocha's forward torpedo room: four officers, four chiefs, and fourteen junior enlisted personnel. LT Cortina, as the senior officer aboard, assumed command. At 21:10, they fired another flare that led searchers to the messenger buoy at 21:31. Messenger buoys on Balao-class submarines do not have telephones, so communication could not be established, but those on the surface did realize that the buoy and flares probably meant that someone was still alive. The survivors held training in the use of the Steinke hood, with which most crewmen were unfamiliar. (The Peruvian Navy, like the United States Navy, had stopped in-water escape training from depth several years previously.)

At 22:50, the smell of chlorine gas in main control prompted another assessment of the boat's condition. A vent valve was found that had not been tightly shut, and more water had seeped into the aft battery compartment. All lithium hydroxide canisters were brought forward, and the survivors sealed themselves in the forward torpedo room. By 23:30, two canisters of lithium hydroxide were opened and spread. (Lithium hydroxide is used in breathing gas purification systems for spacecraft, submarines, etc., to remove carbon dioxide from exhaled gas by producing lithium carbonate and water.) The crew was put to bed.

By midnight on Saturday, 27 August 1988, all twenty survivors and three bodies had been brought ashore. Survivors were taken to the nearby Naval Hospital. Although all suffered from hypothermia, none had significant injuries. At the scene, an assortment of vessels were on the surface, including the submarine, Dos de Mayo, a torpedo retriever, a floating crane, and several small craft.

Locating divers during their off-duty hours was hampered by the lack of telephones in many of their homes, but by midnight, eight were at the scene in SCUBA gear. Depth to the deck of the ship was between 125 feet (38 m) aft and 110 feet (34 m) forward, with the ship variably reported as having between a nine- and fifteen-degree up-angle. The first team of divers followed the messenger buoy's line, which had played out to a significant distance. Since it was not located directly over Pacocha, a second line was tended straight down to the sail. The divers tapped on the hull and received a response from the forward compartment of the boat. However, they were unfamiliar with the code used, so were unable to interpret the tapping.

At 00:40, Contralmirante Tirado called Captain John Schillingsburg USN, the United States Defense Attaché, to request assistance from the United States Navy.

By 01:00 the survivors had sent messages to the rescuers that they should be able to hold out for 48 hours. By 02:00, three volunteers in Pacocha had donned oxygen breathing apparatuses (OBAs) and walked through compartments as far aft as main control. The aft battery compartment had water over the deck, so it was not entered. Meanwhile, personnel ashore including several divers studied the salvage air connections on BAP La Pedrera (the former USS Sea Poacher (SS-406), also a GUPPY IA Balao-class submarine) and discovered that they did not have appropriate salvage air hoses or fittings. Ultimately, Mark V diving system umbilicals were used with fittings manufactured during the night on two frigates. (Mark V diving hoses are negatively buoyant, 1/2-inch (13 mm) inner diameter, 600 psig (4.2 MPa) pressure rated hoses, MIL-H-2815.)

After two frustrating hours, improved communications with Pacocha were finally established at 02:27, using the signal ejector to pass written notes to the divers. Word was received at 03:50 and passed to the survivors that the United States Navy was sending its rescue system. However, over the next few hours the estimated time of arrival of the rescue system shifted steadily later.

Having had no communication from the surface for nearly two hours and unaware that there were currently no divers available, Pacocha fired another flare at 04:20. Yellow was picked so as not to give the impression that something new was seriously wrong—they only wanted to express concern that they had not heard anything in a couple of hours. However, at 04:40 a small electrical short and fire broke out in main control. It was brief and self-extinguishing, but renewed concern for the survivors' atmosphere. Only carbon dioxide extinguishers were available for fire-fighting.

A new group of divers arrived at the scene at about 05:00 after reviewing salvage connections, escape trunk configuration, and other details on La Pedrera. Shortly after the divers went to work, they recovered the body of Pacocha's commanding officer, Capitán de Fragata Nieva, just inside the deck access door to the sail.

At 06:00 the survivors held reveille and prepared breakfast. Utilizing the signal ejector, communication was passed that the crew was in good spirits with enough air to last for seventy-eight hours based on calculations of available oxygen and lithium hydroxide. They also had adequate supplies of water, but no food after eating what little they had, including cake, for breakfast. While inspecting the submarine, the survivors noted a heavy black cloud rising from below the deck in the forward battery compartment. No one entered this compartment again. Two more canisters of lithium hydroxide were opened and spread on the upper bunks. Later in the morning another four canisters were opened. Approximately twenty canisters were unopened. One eight-cubic-foot (230 L) oxygen cylinder was bled into the compartment; three oxygen cylinders were left unused.

Information on the use of the escape trunk and the Steinke hood was passed from the surface. The crew was divided into five groups and one member from each group trained in the operation of the escape trunk. Groups were arranged by seniority, with one officer in four of the five groups, and by other factors such as swimming ability and self-confidence. Via message, Pacocha informed those on the surface that there were twenty-two survivors.

At 07:30 a message was sent to Pacocha informing them that the fly-away rescue system was on the way from the United States. This provided a visible boost to morale among the crewmen, and all involved in the casualty planned to wait for that equipment.

However, by 09:50, the crew was becoming listless, agitated, and hyperventilating. The boat's only atmosphere monitoring equipment was aft in the flooded compartments, but the lithium hydroxide did not seem to be working as well as expected. Cotrina was becoming concerned about the submarine's atmosphere. He spread four additional lithium hydroxide canisters. To exacerbate the situation, their only light, the emergency light located at the bottom of the forward ladder, was periodically flickering on and off, and the beam from their only battle lantern was steadily growing weaker. Cotrina passed a message to the surface requesting guidance. Contralmirante Tirado instructed Cotrina to use his best judgment in deciding when to escape. Cotrina consulted his crew; their recommendations to escape were unanimous with one exception. Teniente Lindley offered various reasons to wait, and if he had to escape, he wanted the divers to provide SCUBA tanks since he had been trained in their use. Cotrina ordered him to join the first group of escapees.

At 11:30, divers completed connecting high and low salvage using Mark V diving umbilicals for hoses and the manufactured fittings. The high salvage was connected to air banks on the submarine BAP Abtao, named after the Battle of Abtao. These banks were charged by thirty-five-year-old, oil-lubricated compressors. There were no filters on the system, and air samples of the air banks had never been taken.

During escape training, crew members decided to inflate their Steinke hoods in the compartment before entering the escape trunk, and to use them as flotation devices, but not to enclose their heads in the hoods. One member of the first group, Chief Monzon, did wear the hood. He was to be the third most seriously injured of the twenty-two escapees. After inflating the escape devices, four men entered the escape trunk and controlled flooding and pressurizing from inside the trunk. After the side access hatch was opened, the four men spent at least ten minutes arguing over who would exit first. Finally Teniente Gomez, the senior man, ducked under and began his ascent, followed in turn by Chief Monzon and Petty Officer Reyes. All three men reached the surface and were promptly rescued. However, within minutes of reaching the surface, they began suffering great pain in their joints, became disoriented and unsteady, experienced shortness of breath, and displayed symptoms of crepitus.

The rescuers on the surface had been told to expect four men in the first group. Finding only three, they began to search for the missing Teniente Lindley. While they searched, the survivors drained and opened the escape trunk, where they found the teniente, alive and well, still in the escape trunk. Lindley reentered the submarine, and was added to the last escape group.

The second group, led by Teniente Augusto Ivan Aranguren Nieri, completed their escape by 12:25 without incident, and were flown by helicopter to the recompression chamber. The helicopter flew low over the water, to keep the air pressure as high as possible.

Immediately after the second group surfaced, air was supplied through the high salvage connection. When the connection was opened aboard Pacocha, high-pressure seawater came from the line since it had not yet been blown dry. The survivors immediately shut the high salvage connection valve and never reopened it. The low salvage line was open to atmosphere on the surface, not pressurized, but was connected to the submarine below the level of water in the bilge. Thus, that line was filled with seawater to a depth equivalent to the pressure in the boat, and did not allow air flow.

All five of the survivors in the third escape group completed an uneventful escape by 12:40. However, after they left, the outer escape hatch could not be shut from inside the submarine, so when the crew attempted to drain the trunk, seawater continued to flood into the submarine until the valves were secured. After the problem was communicated to the surface, divers investigated, discovered that the hatch's dogs were obstructing closure, and freed the obstruction with a large wrench.

The fourth escape group made an uneventful escape by 15:15. On reaching the surface at least one of them was transported to the shore recompression facility by helicopter. The fifth group then made an uneventful escape by 16:25. By this time, a recompression chamber was on scene on the floating crane along with two medical officers. All three in this escape group were recompressed within five minutes of surfacing.

After the fifth group left the escape trunk, divers placed a set of scuba tanks in the trunk. The final three escapees spent between one-half and one hour breathing from the tanks before escaping at 18:05, by which time personnel topside were again becoming apprehensive. Divers were sent to investigate the delay and were present when all three escapees simultaneously emerged from the escape trunk.

Since the chamber at the scene was occupied, these individuals were transported by boat to the shore facility. About an hour and a half lapsed between surfacing and recompression, apparently because no chamber was available. Oficial de Mar 2o. Carlos Grande Rengifo developed such severe decompression sickness (the "bends"), possibly combined with gas embolus, that he died during recompression treatment.

== Aftermath ==
The Peruvian Navy's efforts to salvage Pacocha began on 30 August 1988, immediately after the crew escaped, and continued for eleven months. One hundred fifty men, seventy of them divers from the Salvage Service, worked eight hundred hours, two hundred of preliminary inspection and six hundred diving. The submarine broke the surface again on 23 July 1989, eleven months after she was sunk. After being studied for the effects of the ramming and sinking, her hulk was cannibalized for spare parts for other Peruvian submarines.

Lieutenant Cotrina credited the sequence of events leading to the closing of the forward torpedo room hatch to a miracle coming from the intercession of then Venerable Marija Petković, whom he was praying to while fighting for his and his crewmate's survival. He testified, "I saw a light and I experienced an ineffable power that allowed me to shut the hatch". There is little doubt that if that hatch had not been shut, no one inside the submarine would have survived. Two commissions, one conducted by the Peruvian military, the other by the Vatican came to the conclusion that with the water pressure, it would have been technically impossible for anyone to close the hatch. As such the Roman Catholic Church's Congregation for the Causes of the Saints authenticated the miracle. This is unusual, as normally miracles in the causes of saints, are those for cures believed by the Church to be through the saint's intercession, but in this case the declaration of a miracle was the obtaining of superhuman strength by someone in a disaster situation. On 6 June 2003, Pope John Paul II celebrated Marija's beatification Mass in the Croatian port city of Dubrovnik. Cotrina Alvarado received Holy Communion from the pope on this occasion, and afterwards gave the pope a small replica of the Pacocha as a memento.

== Notes ==
- "The B.A.P. PACOCHA (SS-48) Collision: The Escape and Medical Recompression Treatment of Survivors," by Claude Harvey, M.D. and John Carson, M.D., published 30 March 1989 as Special Report SP89-1 by the Naval Submarine Medical Research Laboratory, Naval Medical Research Center. Copy of report - http://www.dtic.mil/get-tr-doc/pdf?AD=ADB132723 This article incorporates text from this source, which is in the public domain.
- The Web site of the Peruvian Submarine Command, http://www.marina.mil.pe/comandancias/submarinos/comad_sub.htm
- The Holy See's biography of Blessed Marija of Jesus Crucified Petković, https://www.vatican.va/news_services/liturgy/saints/ns_lit_doc_20030606_petkovic_en.html
- "The Miracle of the Pacocha" Official Motion Picture Website Archived 23 July 2008 at the Wayback Machine
- BBC Outlook podcast, 47 minutes, 17 July 2021, BBC website: "Trapped in a 'metal coffin' on the ocean floor" When the Peruvian submarine Pacocha crashed and plunged 42 metres down to the seabed with 22 sailors inside, it was First Lieutenant Roger Cotrina Alvarado's job to save his crew. Apple (same) podcast:
