= Submerged signal ejector =

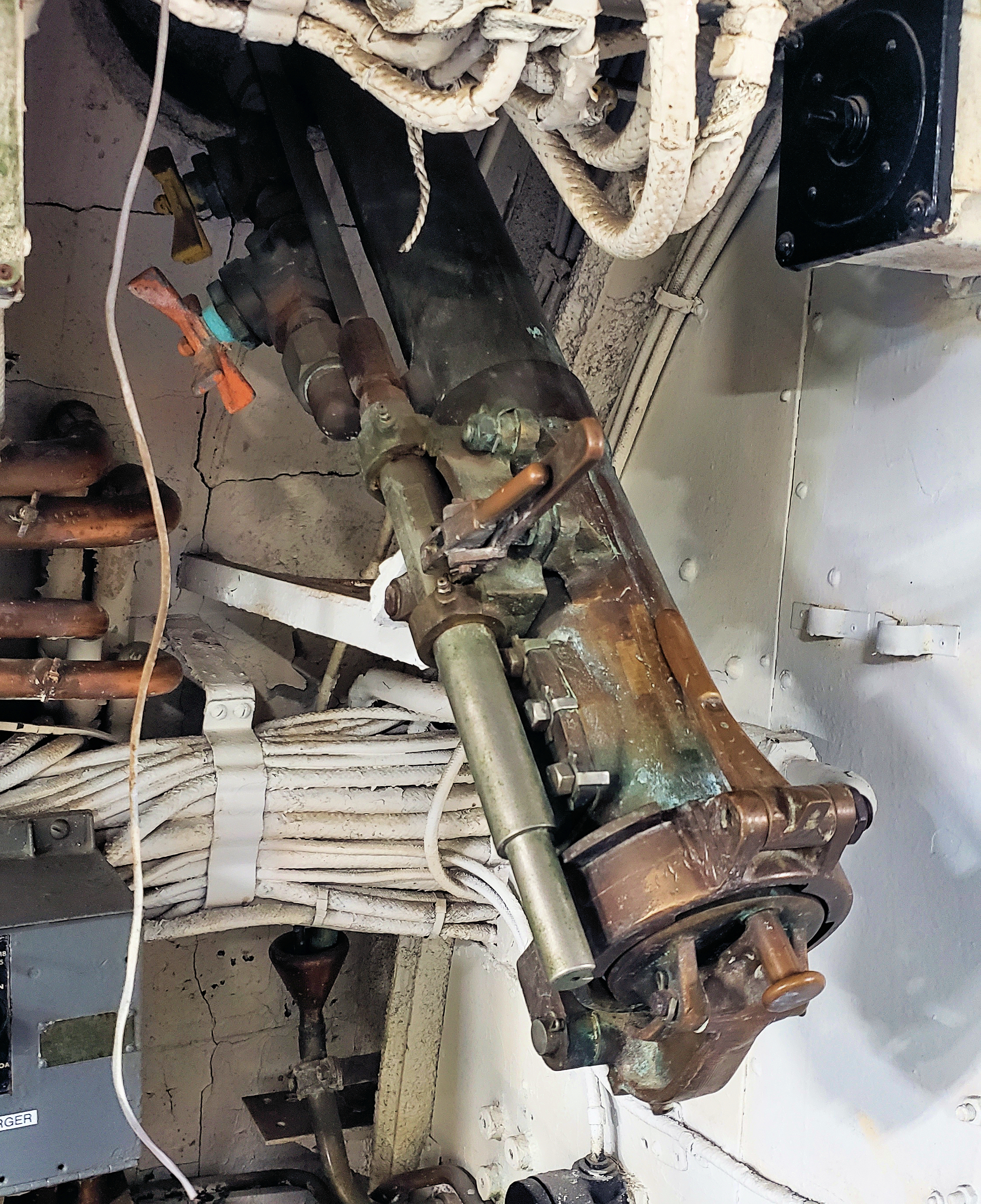
Submerged signal ejector on the USS Cavalla (SS-244)

A submerged signal ejector is a device used by submarines, similar to a torpedo tube. Although, instead of deploying weapons, it launches signal flares, smokes, distress buoys, SEPIRB, water temperature sensors and sonar decoys from the submarine. Signal ejectors can also send communication notes, as was done in the rescuing of the BAP Pacocha (SS-48) crew.
