= Oxygen breathing apparatus =

US Navy breathing apparatus for firefighting

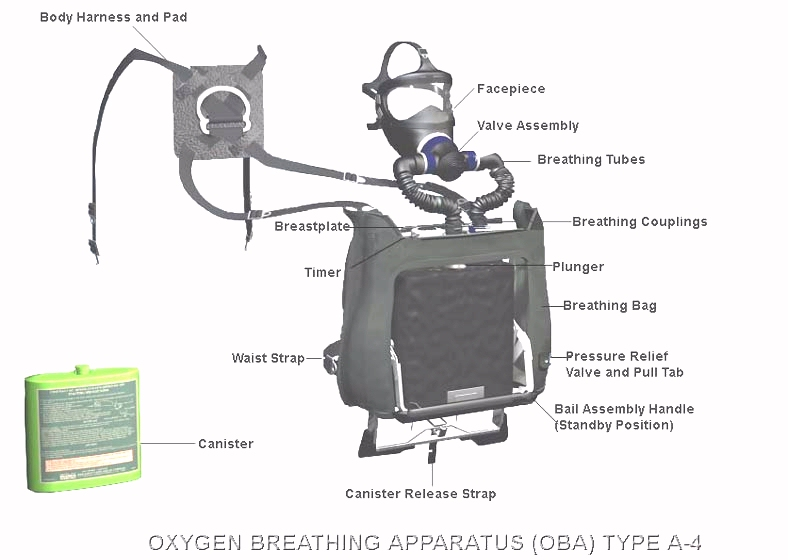

The Oxygen breathing apparatus (OBA) is a closed circuit oxygen rebreather. used primarily in firefighting by the US Navy. Its oxygen is generated by chemicals contained in the green canister, which is inserted at the base of the breathing device. The scrubber canister uses potassium superoxide as both a carbon dioxide absorbent and as an oxygen source. A sodium chlorate oxygen candle in the base of the unit generates oxygen on start-up as the canister has to reach a high internal temperature before it will start generating oxygen. The circulation of exhaled air containing carbon dioxide through the canister starts the chemical process, usually taking less than five minutes to reach a stable state, which is the normal burn time of the "candle", and the mask will initially fill with a light, harmless smoke. The heat of the chemical reaction requires the use of thick leather gloves for handling spent canisters. The bags along either side of the chest unit cool the air mixture before inhalation and is a surprisingly effective system, with the air being quite cool when entering the face mask. There is a 60-minute timer at the top of the chest unit which, during the fighting of a casualty, is set for only 30 minutes, one reason being that the timer is placed on the top of the apparatus and the user cannot see the timer with the facemask on, so setting the timer must be done by feel, turning it all the way to the max and then backing off approx. halfway by feel. Also due to the unknown breathing heaviness of the user during firefighting activities. This would help to ensure the user would have at minimum a 15-minute window to evacuate to a safe atmosphere. Though bulky, it is light and comfortable to wear and does not much interfere with the user's freedom of movement.

As of early 2001, the US Navy has been replacing the OBA for firefighting with the SCBA. The SCBA is more cost-effective than the OBA, and does not produce hazardous waste, a problem with the chemical oxygen generation system.
