= BAP Abtao =

Coordinates: 12.0595°S 77.1506°W

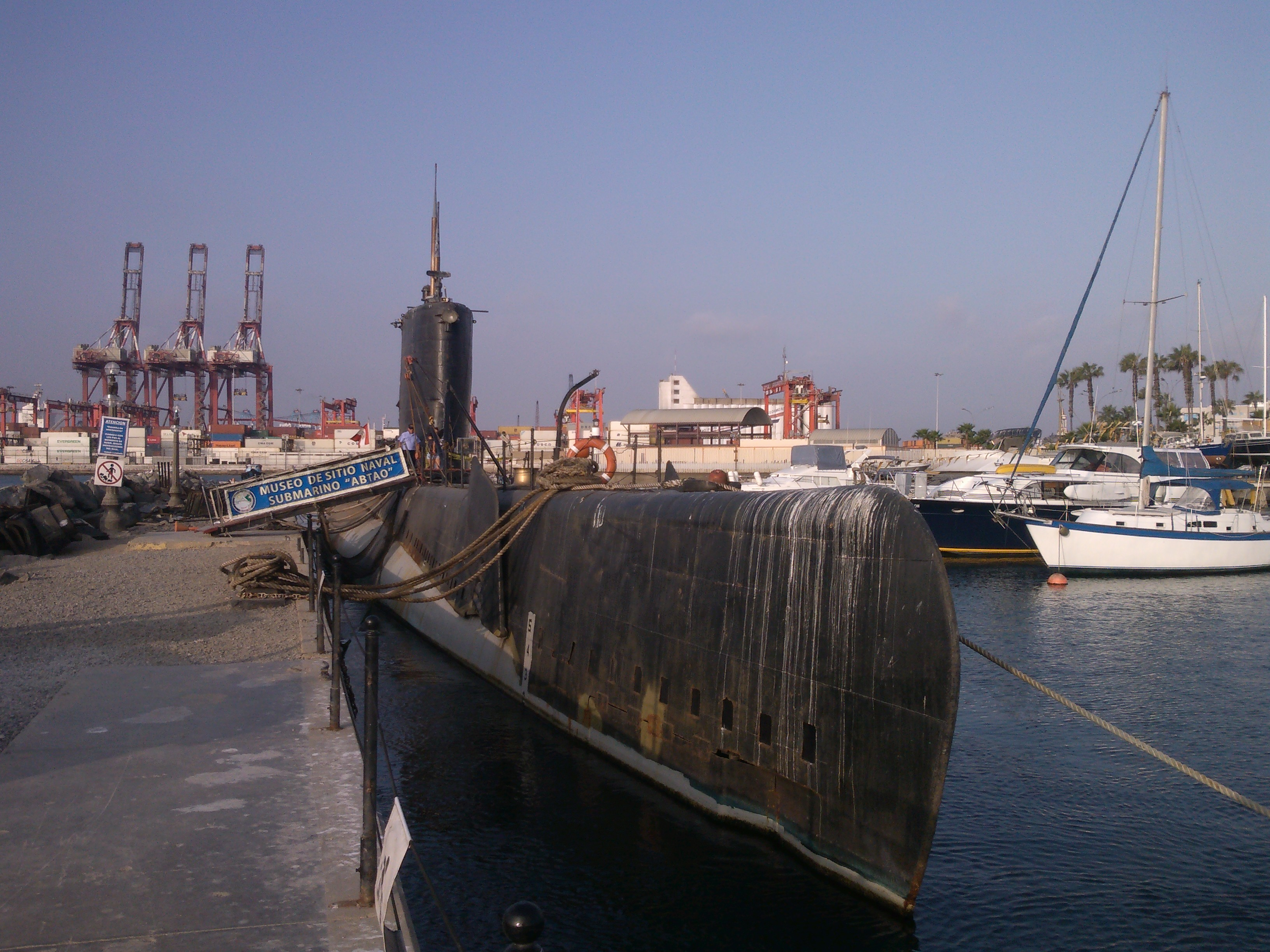
- Abtao as a museum ship in 2014

History

Peru
- Name: Tiburón
- Namesake: Shark
- Ordered: 8 December 1951
- Builder: Electric Boat, Groton, Connecticut
- Launched: 27 October 1953
- Commissioned: 20 February 1954
- Renamed: Abtao, April 1957
- Namesake: Battle of Abtao
- Decommissioned: 10 May 1999
- Status: Museum ship since 2004

General characteristics as built
- Class & type: Abtao-class submarine
- Displacement: 825 long tons (838 t) surfaced; 1,400 long tons (1,422 t) submerged
- Length: 243 ft (74.1 m) (oa)
- Beam: 22 ft (6.7 m)
- Draft: 14 ft (4.3 m)
- Propulsion: 2 diesel engines; 2 electric motors; 2 shafts, 2,400 bhp (1,800 kW)
- Speed: 16 knots (30 km/h; 18 mph) surfaced; 10 knots (19 km/h; 12 mph) submerged
- Range: 5,000 nmi (9,300 km; 5,800 mi) at 10 knots (snorkel)
- Endurance: 45 long tons (46 t) diesel fuel
- Complement: 40
- Sensors & processing systems: SS-2A radar; BQR-3 and BQA-1A sonar
- Armament: 6 × 21 in (533 mm) torpedo tubes (4 forward, 2 aft); 1 × 5 in (127 mm)/25 caliber gun

BAP Abtao (SS-42) is an Abtao-class submarine of the Peruvian Navy. The vessel which was originally named BAP Tiburón ("Shark"), was constructed by the American Electric Boat company in the United States and launched in 1953. The Abtao class were the last submarines constructed by the United States for the export market. The submarine entered service in 1954 and by presidential decree, was renamed Abtao for the battle during the Chincha Islands War.

Armed with six 21-inch (533 mm) torpedo tubes and a 5 in (127 mm)/25 caliber gun, the 243 ft (74.1 m) submarine took part in the rescue of the crew of BAP Pacocha, another submarine that had sunk following a collision with a fishing trawler in August 1988. Abtao was taken out of service in 1999 and converted into a museum ship located in central Callao, Peru. Abtao was the first museum ship in Latin America.

== Design and description ==
The Abtao class were a modified version of the United States World War II Mackerel-class submarine design. Abtao had a surfaced displacement of 825 long tons (838 t) and 1,400 long tons (1,422 t) submerged. It measured 243 ft (74.1 m) long overall with a beam of 22 ft (6.7 m) and a draft of 14 ft (4.3 m).

The submarine was powered by a diesel-electric system composed of two General Motors single-acting Type 278A diesel engines and two electric motors turning two props rated at 2,400 brake horsepower (1,800 kW). Abtao had a maximum speed of 16 knots (30 km/h; 18 mph) when surfaced and 10 knots (19 km/h; 12 mph) submerged. The vessel carried 45 long tons (46 t) of diesel fuel and had a range of 5,000 nautical miles (9,300 km; 5,800 mi) at 10 knots at snorkel depth.

Abtao was armed with six 21-inch (533 mm) torpedo tubes with four located in the bow and two aft. Two vessels of the class, Abtao had a 5 in (127 mm)/25 caliber gun mounted abaft the sail. The gun was manually sighted. The submarine was equipped with SS-2A radar and BQR-3 and BQA-1A sonar. In 1981, Abtao's batteries were replaced and following that, Thomson Sintra Eledone active/passive intercept sonar was installed. The submarine had a complement of 40 officers and ratings.

== Construction and career ==
The Peruvian Navy initially ordered two submarines from Electric Boat on 8 December 1951 based on the United States Navy's Mackerel design. The two submarines, Tiburón ("Shark") and Lobo ("Wolf") were laid down on 12 May 1952 at the shipyard in Groton, Connecticut, United States. Tiburón was launched on 27 October 1953 and commissioned on 20 February 1954. Tiburón and the rest of this class was the last submarines constructed by the United States for the export market. A decree in April 1957 by the President of Peru, Manuel Prado Ugarteche, ordered that the names of the vessels be changed to those of famous Peruvian battles. Tiburón was renamed Abtao for the battle in the Chincha Islands War. Originally assigned pennant number 5, in 1959 Abtao was designated SS-2, then renumbered SS-42 in 1960.

Abtao underwent a refit at Groton in 1965. In 1988, Abtao took part in the rescue of the crew of the submarine BAP Pacocha which had sunk after a collision with the fishing vessel Kiowa Maru. Abtao was removed from service on 10 May 1999 and placed in reserve. The ship was removed from naval service on 10 March 2000 and converted into a museum ship on 28 January 2004 in Lima, Peru due to the work of the Peruvian Navy, the Provincial Council of Callao, and the Marina Yacht Club SA Entities. Abtao's opening as a museum was the first time a ship had been turned into a museum in Latin America.

== See also ==
- Museum ships of the Peruvian Navy
