= USS Sea Poacher =

Submarine of the United States

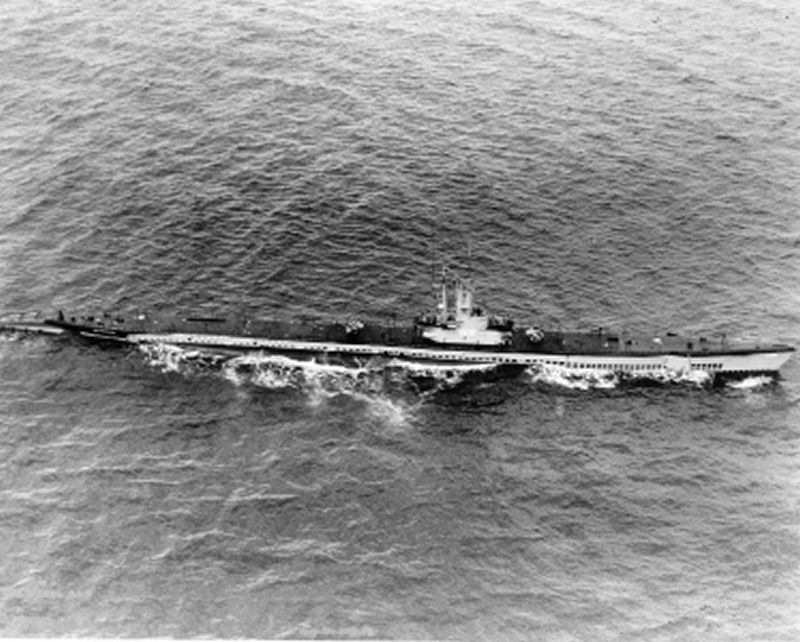
- USS Sea Poacher (SS-406) underway

History

United States
- Name: USS Sea Poacher
- Builder: Portsmouth Naval Shipyard, Kittery, Maine
- Laid down: 23 February 1944
- Launched: 20 May 1944
- Commissioned: 31 July 1944
- Decommissioned: 15 November 1969
- Stricken: 15 August 1973
- Identification: SS-406
- Fate: Transferred to Peru, 1 July 1974

Peru
- Name: Initially BAP Pabellón de Pica, changed a few weeks later to La Pedrera
- Acquired: 1 July 1974
- Decommissioned: 1995
- Identification: S49

General characteristics
- Class & type: Balao-class diesel-electric submarine
- Displacement: 1,526 tons (1,550 t) surfaced; 2,401 tons (2,440 t) submerged
- Length: 311 ft 8 in (95.00 m)
- Beam: 27 ft 3 in (8.31 m)
- Draft: 16 ft 10 in (5.13 m) maximum
- Propulsion: 4 × Fairbanks-Morse Model 38D8-⅛ 10-cylinder opposed piston diesel engines driving electrical generators; 2 × 126-cell Sargo batteries; 4 × high-speed Elliott electric motors with reduction gears; two propellers; 5,400 shp (4.0 MW) surfaced; 2,740 shp (2.0 MW) submerged
- Speed: 20.25 knots (38 km/h) surfaced; 8.75 knots (16 km/h) submerged
- Range: 11,000 nautical miles (20,000 km) surfaced at 10 knots (19 km/h)
- Endurance: 48 hours at 2 knots (3.7 km/h) submerged; 75 days on patrol
- Test depth: 400 ft (120 m)
- Complement: 10 officers, 70–71 enlisted
- Armament: 10 × 21-inch (533 mm) torpedo tubes; 6 forward, 4 aft; 24 torpedoes; 1 × 5-inch (127 mm) / 25 caliber deck gun; Bofors 40 mm and Oerlikon 20 mm cannon

General characteristics (Guppy IA)
- Class & type: none
- Displacement: 1,830 tons (1,859 t) surfaced; 2,440 tons (2,479 t) submerged
- Length: 307 ft 7 in (93.75 m)
- Beam: 27 ft 4 in (8.33 m)
- Draft: 17 ft (5.2 m)
- Propulsion: Snorkel added; Batteries upgraded to Sargo II
- Speed: Surfaced: 17.3 knots (32.0 km/h) maximum; 12.5 knots (23.2 km/h) cruising; Submerged: 15.0 knots (27.8 km/h) for ½ hour; 7.5 knots (13.9 km/h) snorkeling; 3.0 knots (5.6 km/h) cruising
- Range: 17,000 nautical miles (31,000 km) surfaced at 11 knots (20 km/h)
- Endurance: 36 hours at 3 knots (6 km/h) submerged
- Complement: 10 officers; 5 petty officers; 64–69 enlisted men
- Armament: 10 × 21 inch (533 mm) torpedo tubes; (six forward, four aft); all guns removed

USS Sea Poacher (SS/AGSS-406), a Balao-class submarine, was a vessel of the United States Navy named for the sea poacher, a slender, mailed fish of the North Atlantic.

Sea Poacher (SS-406) was built by the Portsmouth Navy Yard in Kittery, Maine; launched on 20 May 1944; sponsored by Mrs. J. H. Spiller, wife of Commander Spiller, hull superintendent at the Navy Yard; and commissioned on 31 July 1944.

== World War II ==
Following underway trials, training, and shakedown in the Portsmouth, New Hampshire, and New London, Connecticut, areas, Sea Poacher transited the Panama Canal and arrived at Pearl Harbor on 25 October 1944. Although her first two war patrols were unproductive, during the third, conducted in the Kuril Islands area, Sea Poacher torpedoed and sank a Japanese trawler and, four days later, sent two fishing boats to the bottom in a surface attack. During the latter action, three crewmen were injured when the 20 millimeter gun exploded. Due to the seriousness of their injuries, the patrol was terminated ahead of schedule, and the submarine returned to Midway.

After conducting her fourth war patrol off the eastern coast of Honshū and Hokkaidō, Sea Poacher was undergoing refitting at Pearl Harbor when the war ended on 15 August 1945.

== 1946 – 1974 ==
From 1946 to 1949, Sea Poacher was based at Balboa, Canal Zone, as a unit of Submarine Squadron 6 (SubRon 6) engaging in fleet exercises and antisubmarine training, and, on 1 June 1949, was transferred to Key West, Florida, as a unit of SubRon 4. In 1951, the submarine became the first GUPPY IA conversion performed at the Charleston Naval Shipyard.

For the remainder of her 25-year career, Sea Poacher operated for the most part in the Key West and Caribbean areas, providing services to various units of the Atlantic Fleet with time out for tours of duty with the 6th Fleet in the Mediterranean and various exercises with NATO forces. On 10 July 1952, while operating in the Key West area, the submarine had the unique experience of rescuing a blimp which had suffered an engine casualty and was floating helplessly in the water. The submarine promptly came to the aid of the stricken airship and proceeded to tow it the 40 miles (64 km) back to its base at Naval Air Station, Boca Chica, Florida.

In July 1959, Sea Poacher was transferred to SubRon 12, also based at Key West, and continued to serve as a unit of this squadron for the remainder of her active service. In the fall of 1962, Sea Poacher was deployed with other Atlantic Fleet units maintaining the quarantine imposed on Cuba during the missile crisis.

In 1969, Sea Poacher concluded her service with a 3 1/2-month deployment to the eastern and northern Atlantic areas to participate in antisubmarine training exercises with units of the Spanish and Portuguese navies. Upon returning to Key West, the submarine operated locally and in the Caribbean until 20 October when she set sail for Philadelphia and in-activation. Sea Poacher was reclassified an Auxiliary Submarine AGSS-406 on 1 November, decommissioned on 15 November 1969, and was assigned to the Atlantic Reserve Fleet at Philadelphia. On 30 June 1971, she reassumed the designation of a fleet submarine (SS). On 15 August 1973, her name was struck from the Navy List, and the submarine was sold to Peru in July 1974.

== BAP La Pedrera (S-49) ==
Sea Poacher was transferred (sold) under terms of the Security Assistance Program, to Peru, 1 July 1974. She was commissioned into the Peruvian Navy, initially as BAP Pabellón de Pica (S-49), but her name was changed a few weeks later to La Pedrera. She was taken out of service in 1995, and relegated to pierside training.

== Honors and awards ==
As Sea Poacher, she received four battle stars for World War II service.
