= BAP Paita (DT-141) =

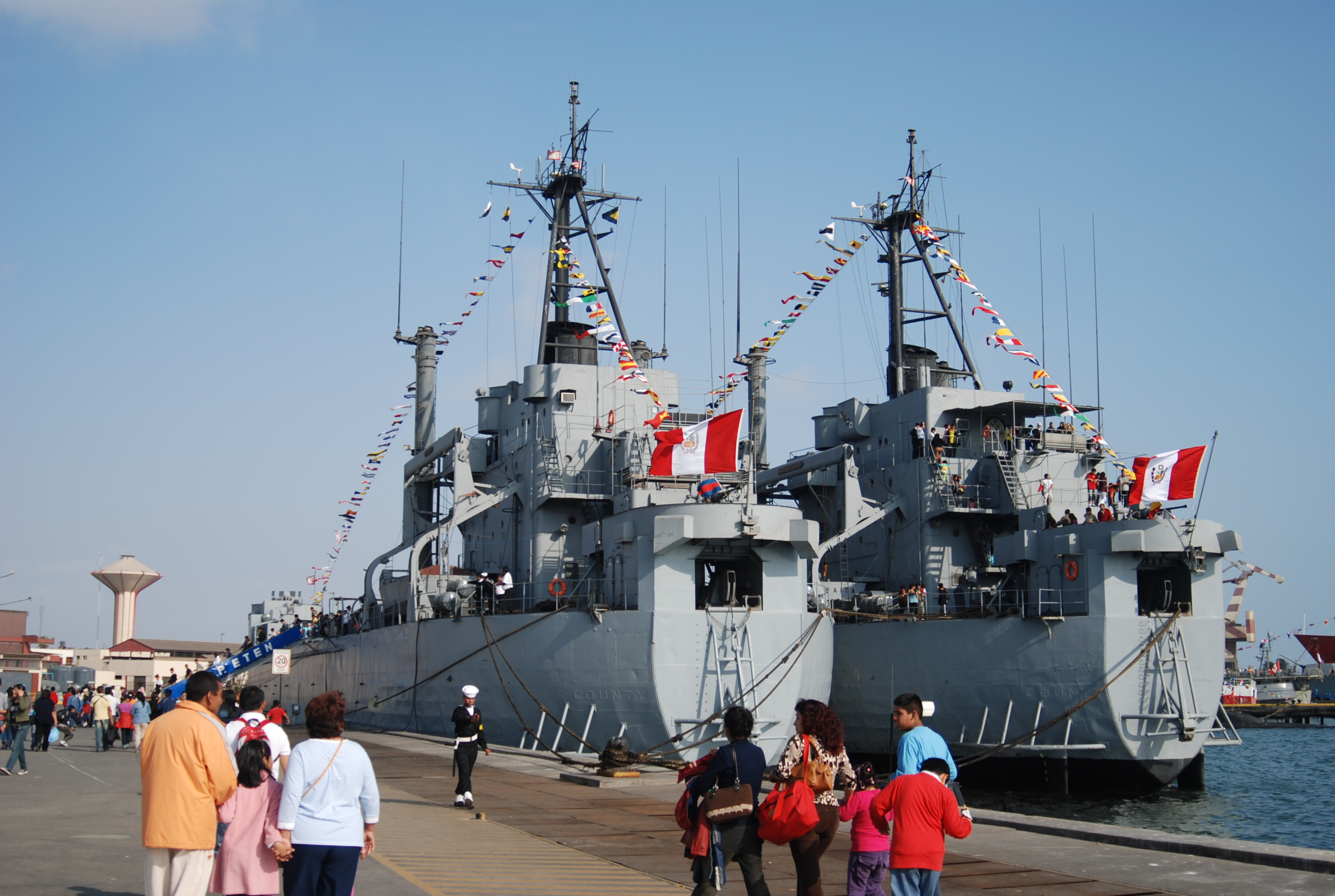
- BAP Paita (right) moored outboard of BAP Eten in 2008

History

United States
- Name: Walworth County
- Builder: Ingalls Shipbuilding Corporation, Pascagoula, Mississippi
- Laid down: 22 September 1952
- Launched: 15 May 1953
- Commissioned: 26 October 1953
- Decommissioned: 2 April 1971
- In service: with Military Sealift Command in non-commissioned service from May 1972 to 1 November 1973
- Renamed: USS Walworth County 1 July 1955 (used to be USS LST-1164); Became USNS Walworth County May 1972
- Reclassified: T-LST-1164 May 1972
- Fate: Leased to Peru 7 August 1984

Peru
- Name: Paita
- Acquired: 7 August 1984
- Commissioned: 4 March 1985
- Decommissioned: September 2012

General characteristics
- Class & type: LST-1156-(Terrebonne Parish-) class landing ship tank
- Displacement: 2,590 tons (light); 5,800 tons (full load)
- Length: 384 ft (117 m)
- Beam: 55 ft (17 m)
- Draft: 17 ft (5.2 m)
- Installed power: 6,000 shp (4,470 kW)
- Propulsion: Four General Motors 16-278A diesel engines, two controllable-pitch propellers
- Speed: 14 kn (16 mph; 26 km/h)
- Capacity: 2,000 tons cargo
- Troops: 395
- Complement: 116
- Armor: 5 × Bofors 40 mm anti-aircraft guns

BAP Paita (DT-141) is the former-USS Walworth County (LST-1164), a Landing Ship, Tank leased from the US Navy for five years on 7 August 1984; recommissioned 4 March 1985; leased later extended to 1994.

The Paita participated in joint military amphibious training exercises with the United States in 2002, the largest such training exercise ever held by Peru. She is no longer in service, as the unit is no longer listed under operational ships in the Peruvian navy web page. She was officially decommissioned in September 2012.

== Footnotes ==
- Saunders, Stephen. Jane's Fighting Ships 2002–2003. Coulsdon, UK: Jane's Information Group, 2002. ISBN 0710624328.
