= Italian ship Lupo =

Lupo has been borne by at least two ships of the Italian Navy and may refer to: .

- Italian torpedo boat Lupo, a Spica-class torpedo boat launched in 1937 and sunk in 1942
- Italian frigate Lupo (F 564), a Lupo-class frigate launched in 1976. Sold to Peru in 2004 and renamed Palacios.
