= List of ship launches in 1978 =

The list of ship launches in 1978 includes a chronological list of all ships launched in 1978.

Date	Ship	Class / type	Builder	Location	Country	Notes
7 January	Markinch	Cargo ship	Appledore Shipbuilders Ltd.	Appledore	United Kingdom	For J. & J. Denholm Ltd.
10 January	S.A. Sederberg	The Big Whites-type refrigerated cargo ship	Chantiers de France	Dunkerque	France	For Deutsche West-Afrika-Linie
14 January	Frank Cable	Emory S. Land-class submarine tender	Lockheed Shipbuilding	Seattle, Washington	United States	For United States Navy.
21 January	Nassau	Tarawa-class amphibious assault ship	Ingalls Shipbuilding	Pascagoula, Mississippi	United States	For United States Navy.
27 January	Coastal Hercules	Supertanker	Harland & Wolff	Belfast	United Kingdom	For Pomona Shipping Co.
31 January	S.A. Waterberg	The Big Whites-type refrigerated cargo ship	Chantiers Navals de La Ciotat	La Ciotat	France	For Deutsche West-Afrika-Linie
7 February	Villavisencio	Modified Lupo-class frigate			Peru	For Peruvian Navy
18 February	Mercandian Transporter II	Type FV 610 Ro-Ro ship	Frederikshavn Vaerft	Frederikshavn	Denmark	For Per Henriksen
24 February	Nordfriesland	Ferry	Husumer Schiffswerft GmbH	Husum	West Germany	For Wyker Dampfschiffs-Reederei Föhr-Amrum GmbH
25 February	John Rodgers	Spruance-class destroyer	Ingalls Shipbuilding	Pascagoula, Mississippi	United States	For United States Navy.
1 March	Duncan	Oliver Hazard Perry-class frigate	Todd Pacific Shipyards	Seattle, Washington	United States	For United States Navy.
3 March	Yulius Fuchik	Barge carrier	Valmet Vuosaari shipyard	Helsinki	Finland	For V/O Sudoimport
3 March	Costa Rica	RoRo-ship	Ankerløkken Verft Glommen A/S	Fredrikstad	Norway	For Linera Naviera Oan Atlantica S.A.
5 March	Cerinthus	Cargo ship	Appledore Shipbuilders Ltd.	Appledore	United Kingdom	For Hadley Shipping Co. Ltd.
17 March	Transvaal	Type MCS 2700 reefer	Howaldtswerke-Deutsche Werft	Kiel	West Germany	For Deutsche West-Afrika-Linie
20 March	Merzario Espania	Ferry			South Korea	For Stena Container Line
20 March	Poseidon	Type 209 submarine	Howaldtswerke-Deutsche Werft	Kiel	West Germany	For Greek Navy
23 March	Australind	Cargo ship	Bartram & Sons Ltd	Sunderland	United Kingdom	For Australind Steamship Co.
8 April	Leftwich	Spruance-class destroyer	Ingalls Shipbuilding	Pascagoula, Mississippi	United States	For United States Navy.
25 April	Exeter	Type 42 destroyer	Swan Hunter	Wallsend, England	United Kingdom	For Royal Navy.
7 May	Spartan	Swiftsure-class submarine	Vickers-Armstrongs		United Kingdom	For Royal Navy.
19 May	S.A. Winterberg	The Big Whites-type refrigerated cargo ship	Chantiers de l'Atlantique	Saint Nazaire	France	For Deutsche West-Afrika-Linie
14 June	Amfitriti	Type 209 submarine	Howaldtswerke-Deutsche Werft	Kiel	West Germany	For Greek Navy.
17 June	Cushing	Spruance-class destroyer	Ingalls Shipbuilding	Pascagoula, Mississippi	United States	For United States Navy.
21 June	Adelaide	Adelaide-class frigate	Todd Pacific Shipyards	Seattle, Washington	United States	For Royal Australian Navy.
23 June	City of Plymouth	Container ship	Appledore Shipbuilders Ltd.	Appledore	United Kingdom	For Container Rentals Ltd.
24 June	Appleby	Bulk carrier	Harland & Wolff	Belfast	United Kingdom	For Ropner Shipping.
3 July	Krechet	Koni-class frigate	Shipyard 340	Zelenodolsk	Soviet Union	For Soviet Navy.
22 July	Bremerton	Los Angeles-class submarine	Electric Boat	Groton, Connecticut	United States	For United States Navy.
25 July	Al Munassir	Amphibious warfare ship	Brooke Marine	Lowestoft, England	United Kingdom	For Royal Omani Navy.
29 July	Wadsworth	Oliver Hazard Perry-class frigate	Todd Pacific Shipyards	San Pedro, California	United States	For United States Navy.
10 August	Harry W. Hill	Spruance-class destroyer	Ingalls Shipbuilding	Pascagoula, Mississippi	United States	For United States Navy.
August	Centro America	RoRo-ship	Ankerløkken Verft Glommen A/S	Frederikstad	Norway	For Linera Naviera Oan Atlantica S.A.
18 September	Shirane	Shirane-class destroyer			Japan	For Japanese Navy.
25 September	O'Bannon	Spruance-class destroyer	Ingalls Shipbuilding	Pascagoula, Mississippi	United States	For United States Navy.
6 October	Hornby Grange	Tanker	Harland & Wolff	Belfast	United Kingdom	For Furness Withy.
14 October	City of Perth	Container ship	Appledore Shipbuilders Ltd.	Appledore	United Kingdom	For Container Rentals Ltd.
14 October	Mercandian Importer II	type FV 610 Ro-Ro ship	Frederikshavn Vaerft	Frederikshavn	Denmark	For Per Henriksen.
21 October	Arkansas	Virginia-class cruiser	Newport News Shipbuilding	Newport News, Virginia	United States	For United States Navy.
4 November	McInerney	Oliver Hazard Perry-class frigate	Bath Iron Works	Bath, Maine	United States	For United States Navy.
16 November	Okeanos	Type 209 submarine	Howaldtswerke-Deutsche Werft	Kiel	West Germany	For Greek Navy
18 November	Jacksonville	Los Angeles-class submarine	Electric Boat	Groton, Connecticut	United States	For United States Navy.
21 November	Turella	Cruiseferry	Wärtsilä Turku Shipyard	Turku	Finland	For SF Line for Viking Line traffic
25 November	Peleliu	Tarawa-class amphibious assault ship	Ingalls Shipbuilding	Pascagoula, Mississippi	United States	For United States Navy.
1 December	Canberra	Adelaide-class frigate	Todd Pacific Shipyards	Seattle, Washington	United States	For Royal Australian Navy.
2 December	Dupleix	Georges Leygues-class frigate			France	For French Navy.
14 December	Illustrious	Invincible-class aircraft carrier	Swan Hunter	Wallsend, England	United Kingdom	For Royal Navy.
15 December	Brilliant	Type 22 frigate	Yarrow Shipbuilders	Glasgow, Scotland	United Kingdom	For Royal Navy.
16 December	George Philip	Oliver Hazard Perry-class frigate	Todd Pacific Shipyards	San Pedro, California	United States	For United States Navy.
28 December	Seatrain Oriskany	Container ship	Namura Shipbuilding Company	Imari	Japan	
Unknown date	Emadala	Ferry	Rickmers Rederei	Bremerhaven, Germany	West Germany	For Emadala Shipping Co
Unknown date	Glenbrook	Tug	Arklow Engineering Co Ltd.	Arklow, Ireland	Ireland	Unidentified owner.
