= BAP Almirante Grau (FM-53) =

Peruvian naval ship

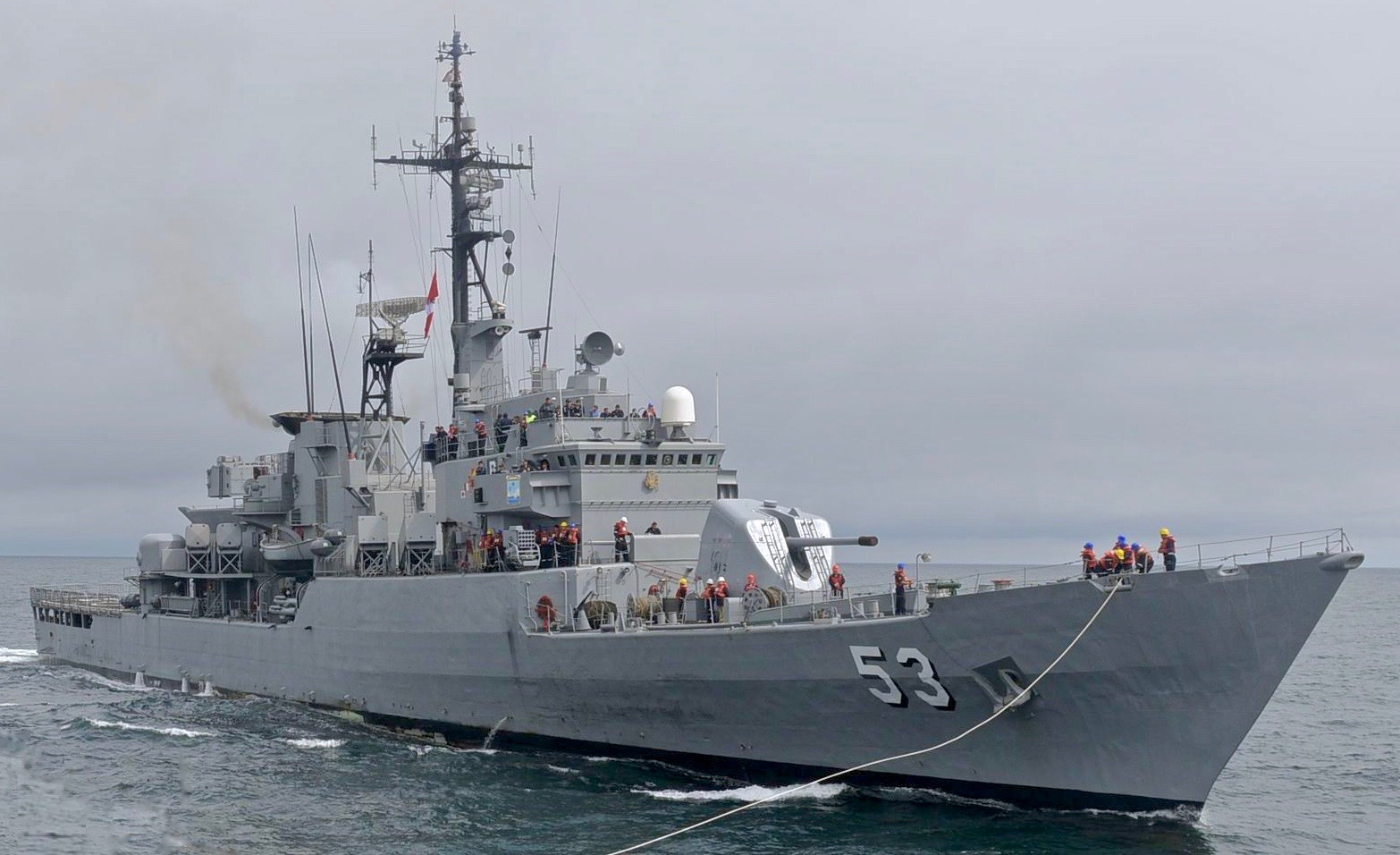
- As BAP Montero in September 2014

History

Peru
- Name: Montero (1984-2017), Almirante Grau (from 2017)
- Namesake: Lizardo Montero Flores, later Miguel Grau Seminario
- Ordered: 1973
- Builder: SIMA Callao
- Laid down: 16 June 1976
- Launched: 8 October 1982
- Commissioned: 29 July 1984
- Home port: Callao
- Identification: FM-53
- Status: Active in service
- Notes: ITU callsign: OBHF

General characteristics
- Class & type: Carvajal-class frigate
- Displacement: 2,206 tonnes (2,525 tonnes full load)
- Length: 113.2 m (371 ft) overall; 106 m (348 ft) waterline
- Beam: 11.3 m (37 ft)
- Draught: 3.7 m (12 ft)
- Propulsion: 2-shaft CODOG system; 2 GE / Fiat LM2500 gas turbines 50,000 shp (37,000 kW); 2 GMT A230-20 diesel engines 7,800 shp (5,800 kW)
- Range: 4,350 nautical miles (8,056 km) at 16 knots (30 km/h)
- Complement: 199 (22 officers)
- Sensors & processing systems: Selenia IPN-10 action data automation (CMS); 1 RAN-10S early warning radar; 1 RAN-11L/X surface search radar; 2 RTN-10X fire control radar; 2 RTN-20X fire control radar; 1 Decca BridgeMaster II navigation radar; EDO 610E(P) hull sonar
- Armament: 8 Otomat Mk 2 SSMs; 1 Albatros octuple launcher for Aspide SAM; 2 ILAS-3 triple torpedo tubes; 1 OTO Melara 127/54 mm gun; 2 OTO Melara Twin 40/L70 DARDO compact gun
- Aircraft carried: 1 AB-212ASW helicopter or; 1 ASH-3D Sea King (deck only)
- Aviation facilities: Fixed hangar for 1 medium helicopter

BAP Almirante Grau is the third out of four Carvajal-class frigates ordered by the Peruvian Navy in 1973 and originally named Montero. It was built by SIMA (Servicio Industrial de la Marina) at Callao under license from the Italian shipbuilder Cantieri Navali Riuniti. As such, it was the first modern warship built in Peru. In late 2007 its flight deck was extended to allow ASH-3D Sea King helicopters to land and refuel, although they cannot be housed in the ship's hangar.

On 26 September 2017, the ship was renamed BAP Almirante Grau on designation as the Peruvian fleet's flagship, following the decommissioning of the previous flagship, Almirante Grau CLM-81.

As Montero, the ship was named after Rear Admiral Lizardo Montero Flores (1832–1905) who fought in the War of the Pacific, and now honours Admiral Miguel Grau Seminario (1834-1879), hero of the Naval Battle of Angamos.

== International exercises ==
- RIMPAC (Hawaii-USA) 2002.
- SIFOREX (Peru) 2001, 2003, 2004, 2007.
- UNITAS
  - Phase-0 (Puerto Rico) 1993, 1997.
  - Phase-4 (Peru) 1984, 1985, 1987, 1988, 1989, 1990, 1991, 1995, 1996, 1999, 2000.
  - Atlantic Phase 2003 (Argentina).
  - Pacific Phase 2004 (Peru), 2006 (Chile), 2007 (Peru).

== Gallery ==
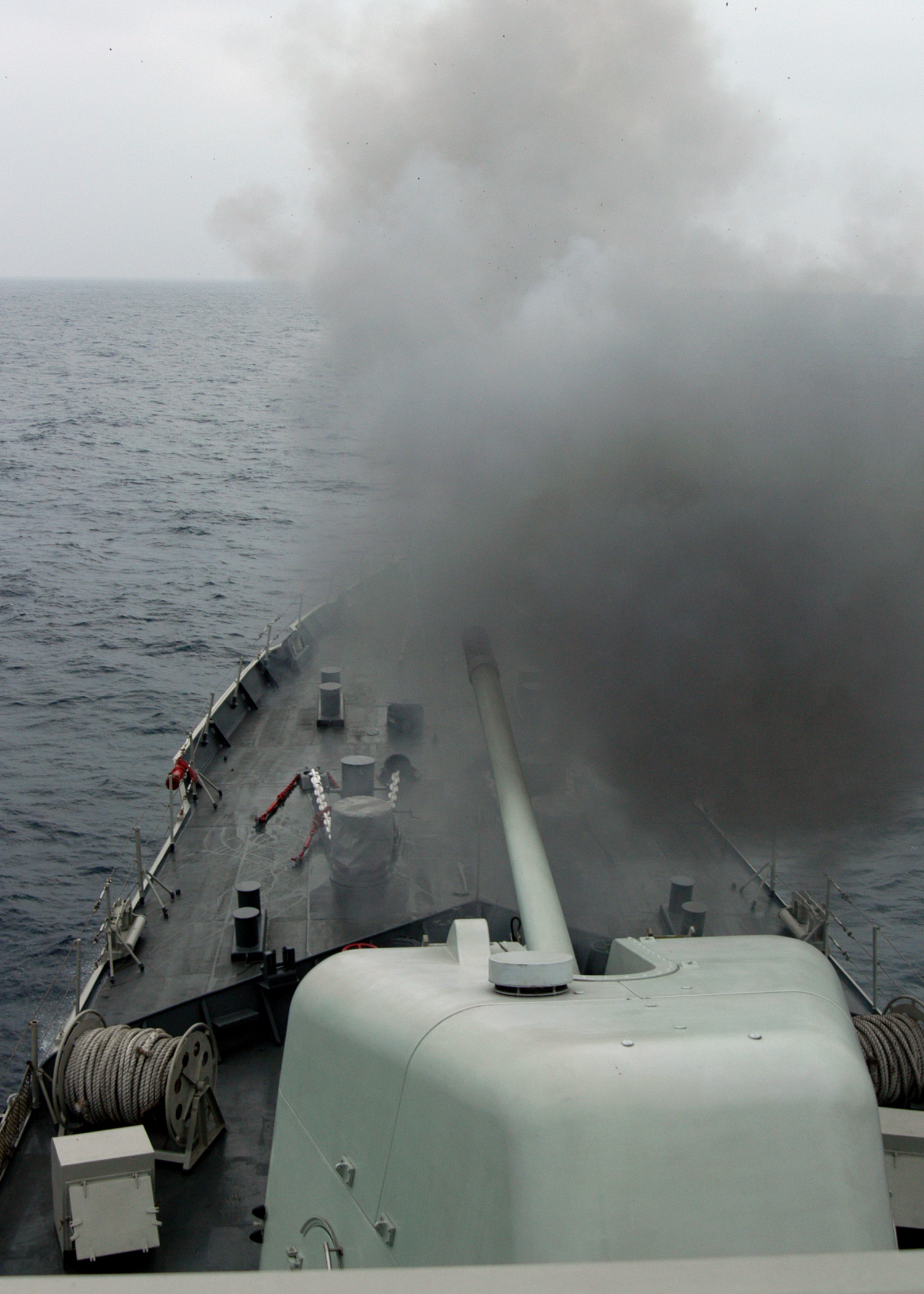
Unitas 45-04 Perú - BAP Montero (FM-53) in firing run

== Sources ==
- Rodríguez, John, "Las fragatas Lupo: una breve mirada retrospectiva y perspectivas". Revista de Marina, Year 95, No. 3: 8-32 (July / December 2002)
- Scheina, Robert L. & Smigielski, Adam (1995). "Peru". In Chumbley, Stephen (ed.). Conway's All the World's Fighting Ships, 1947–1995 (revised ed.). Naval Institute Press. pp. 303–307. ISBN 1-55750-132-7.
