= Italian ship Sagittario =

Sagittario has been borne by at least three ships of the Italian Navy and may refer to:

- Italian torpedo boat Sagittario (1905), a Sirio-class torpedo boat launched in 1905 and discarded in 1923.
- Italian torpedo boat Sagittario (1936), a Spica-class torpedo boat launched in 1936 and stricken in 1964.
- Italian frigate Sagittario (F 565), a Lupo-class frigate launched in 1977. Sold to Peru in 2006 and renamed Quiñones.
