= Italian ship Perseo =

Perseo has been borne by at least three ships of the Italian Navy and may refer to:

- Italian torpedo boat Perseo (1905), a Pegaso-class torpedo boat launched in 1905 and sunk in 1917.
- Italian torpedo boat Perseo (1935), a Spica-class torpedo boat launched in 1935 and sunk in 1943.
- Italian frigate Perseo (F 566), a Lupo-class frigate launched in 1978. Sold to Peru in 2006 and renamed Coronel Bolognesi.
