= Italian frigate Orsa =

Fourth ship of the Lupo-class frigate of the Italian Navy

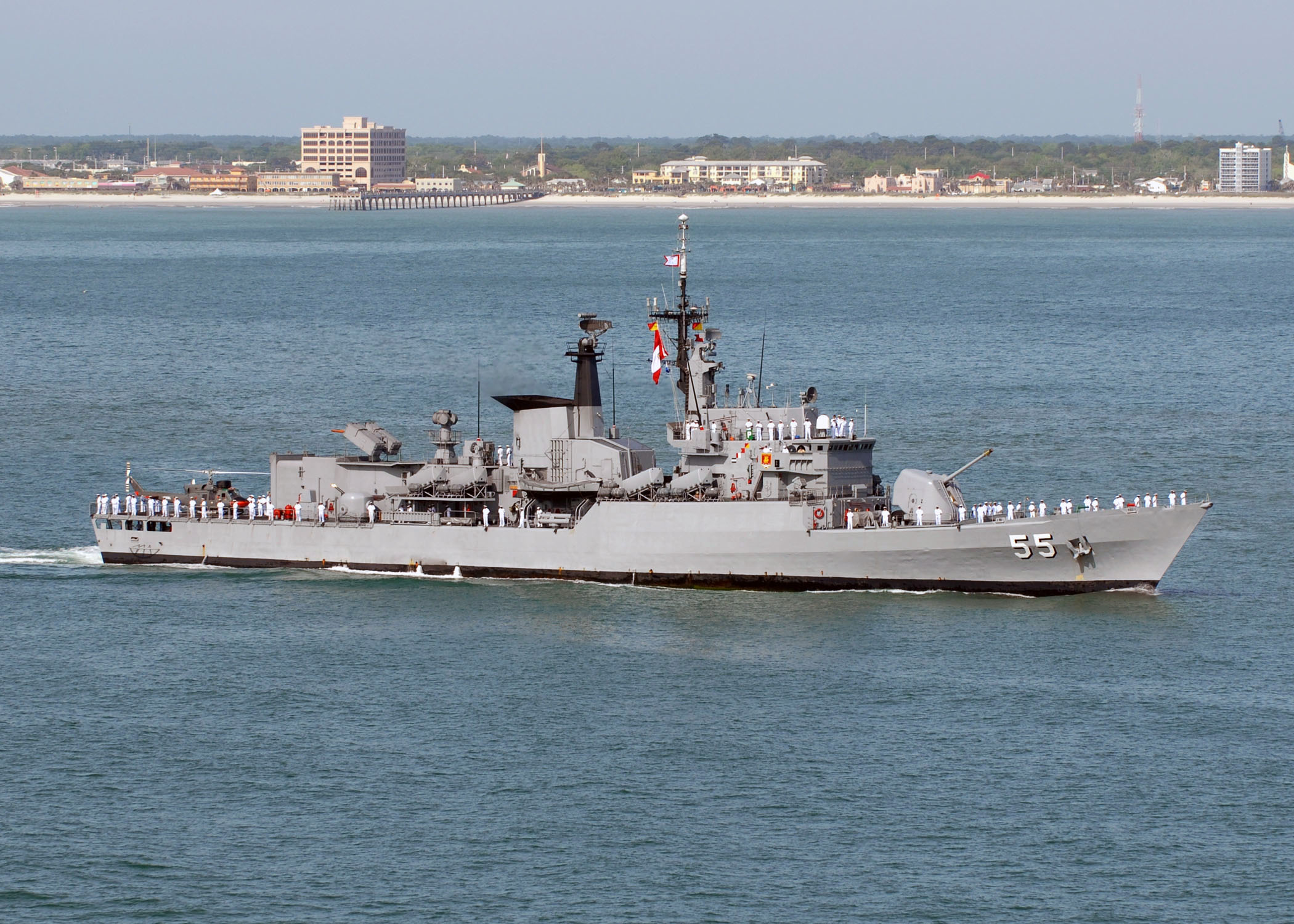
- Aguirre underway in Jacksonville on 4 May 2009.

History

Italy
- Name: Orsa
- Namesake: Orsa
- Builder: Cantiere navale del Muggiano, Muggiano
- Laid down: 1 August 1977
- Launched: 1 March 1979
- Commissioned: 1 March 1980
- Decommissioned: 2003
- Home port: La Spezia
- Identification: Pennant number: F 567
- Motto: Fortitude Fortior
- Fate: Sold to Peruvian Navy

History

Peru
- Name: Aguirre
- Commissioned: 3 November 2004
- Home port: Callao
- Identification: Pennant number: FM-55
- Status: Active

General characteristics
- Class & type: Carvajal-class frigate
- Displacement: 2,206 tonnes (2,525 tonnes full load)
- Length: 113.2 m (371 ft 5 in) overall; 106.0 m (347 ft 9 in) waterline
- Beam: 11.3 m (37 ft 1 in)
- Draught: 3.7 m (12 ft 2 in)
- Propulsion: 2-shaft CODOG system; 2 GE / Fiat LM2500 gas turbines 50,000 shp (37,000 kW); 2 GMT A230-20 diesel engines 7,800 shp (5,800 kW)
- Range: 4,350 nmi (8,056 km) at 16 knots (30 km/h)
- Complement: 199 (22 officers)
- Sensors & processing systems: Selenia IPN-10 action data automation (CMS); 1 RAN-10S early warning radar; 1 RAN-11L/X surface search radar; 2 RTN-10X fire control radar; 2 RTN-20X fire control radar; 1 Decca BridgeMaster II navigation radar; EDO 610E(P) hull sonar
- Armament: 8 Otomat Mk 2 SSMs; 1 Albatros octuple launcher for Aspide SAM; 2 ILAS-3 triple torpedo tubes; 1 OTO Melara 127 mm/54 gun; 2 OTO Melara Twin 40L70 DARDO compact gun
- Aircraft carried: 1 AB-212ASW helicopter or; 1 ASH-3D Sea King (deck only)
- Aviation facilities: Fixed hangar for 1 medium helicopter

Orsa (F 567) is the fourth ship of the Lupo-class frigate of the Italian Navy. She was sold to Peruvian Navy in the 2000s.

Aguirre (FM-55) is one of eight Carvajal-class frigates of the Peruvian Navy.

== Construction and career ==
=== Italian service ===
The ship initially built for the Italian Navy and was named Perseo with a pennant of F 566. The ship was laid down on 1 August 1977, was launched on 1 March 1979 by the shipyard Riva Trigoso and commissioned in the Italian Navy on 1 March 1980.

=== Peruvian service ===
She was commissioned on 3 November 2004 . For its commissioning process, Coronel Bolognesi sailed from the port of La Spezia in the Mediterranean Sea, across the Atlantic Ocean and into the Pacific Ocean via the Panama Canal, and south to its base in Callao.

== Bibliography ==
- Scheina, Robert L. & Smigielski, Adam (1995). "Peru". In Chumbley, Stephen (ed.). Conway's All the World's Fighting Ships, 1947–1995 (revised ed.). Naval Institute Press. pp. 303–307. ISBN 1-55750-132-7.
