= BAP Mariátegui =

1984 Lupo-class frigate

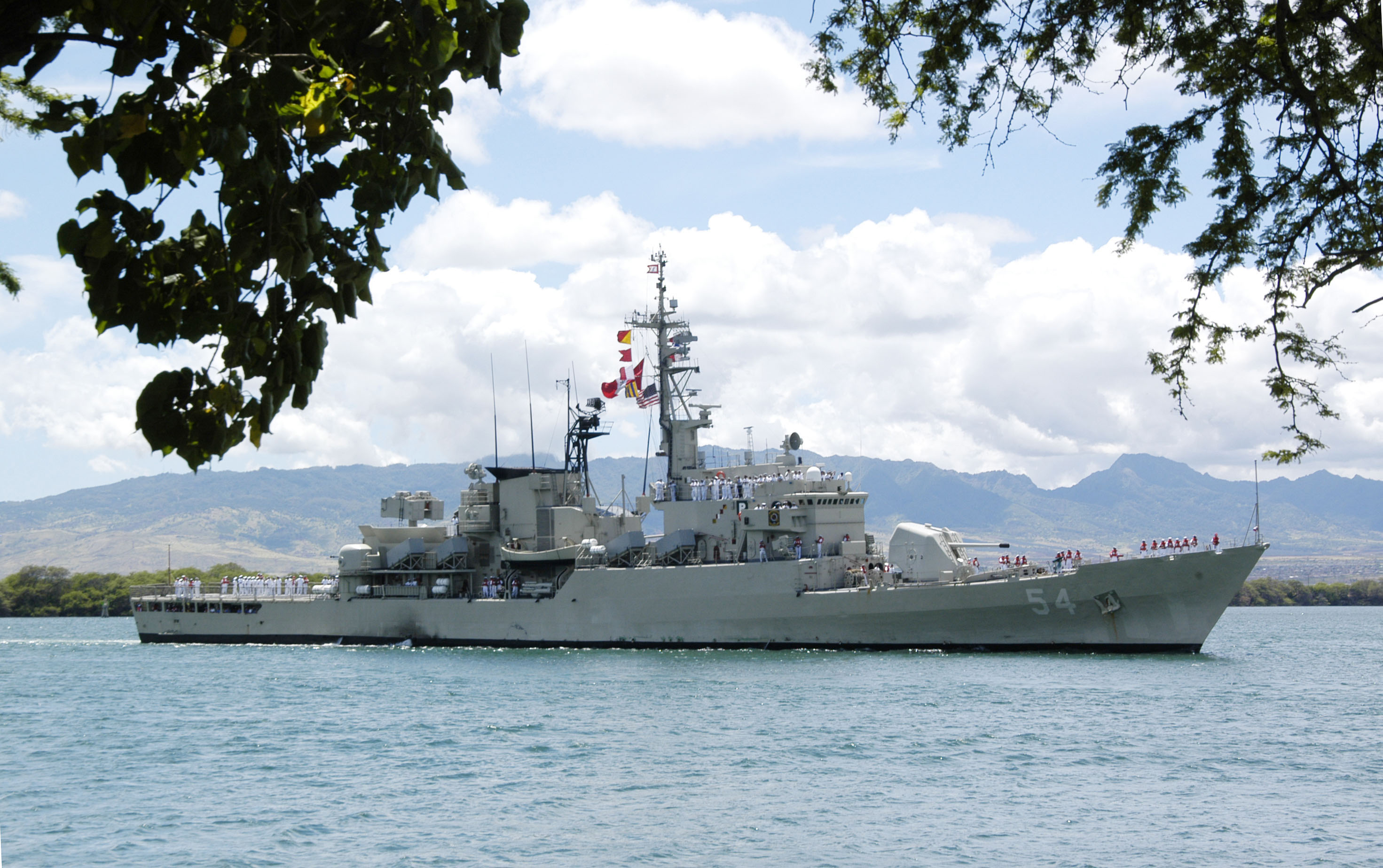
- BAP Mariátegui in June 2006

History

Peru
- Name: Mariátegui
- Namesake: Ignacio Mariátegui
- Ordered: 1973
- Builder: SIMA Callao
- Laid down: 13 August 1976
- Launched: 8 October 1984
- Commissioned: 28 December 1987
- Home port: Callao
- Identification: FM-54
- Status: Active in service
- Notes: ITU callsign: OBHE

General characteristics
- Class & type: Carvajal-class frigate
- Displacement: 2,206 tonnes (2,525 tonnes full load)
- Length: 113.2 m (371 ft) overall; 106 m (348 ft) waterline
- Beam: 11.3 m (37 ft)
- Draught: 3.7 m (12 ft)
- Propulsion: 2-shaft CODOG system; 2 GE / Fiat LM2500 gas turbines 50,000 shp (37,000 kW); 2 GMT A230-20 diesel engines 7,800 shp (5,800 kW)
- Range: 4,350 nautical miles (8,056 km) at 16 knots (30 km/h)
- Complement: 199 (22 officers)
- Sensors & processing systems: Selenia IPN-10 action data automation (CMS); 1 RAN-10S early warning radar; 1 RAN-11L/X surface search radar; 2 RTN-10X fire control radar; 2 RTN-20X fire control radar; 1 Decca BridgeMaster II navigation radar; EDO 610E(P) hull sonar
- Armament: 8 Otomat Mk 2 SSMs; 1 Albatros octuple launcher for Aspide SAM; 2 ILAS-3 triple torpedo tubes; 1 OTO Melara 127/54 mm gun; 2 OTO Melara Twin 40L70 DARDO compact gun
- Aircraft carried: 1 AB-212ASW helicopter or; 1 ASH-3D Sea King (deck only)
- Aviation facilities: Fixed hangar for 1 medium helicopter

BAP Mariátegui is the last out of four Carvajal-class frigates ordered by the Peruvian Navy in 1973. It was built by SIMA (Servicio Industrial de la Marina) at Callao under license from the Italian shipbuilder Cantieri Navali Riuniti. Shortage of funds and technical difficulties delayed her completion for several years, being finally commissioned in 1987. In 1998 her flight deck was extended to allow ASH-3D Sea King helicopters to land and refuel, even though they are too large to be accommodated in the ship's hangar.

Mariátegui is named after Rear Admiral Ignacio Mariátegui who fought in the Peruvian War of Independence.

== Gallery ==
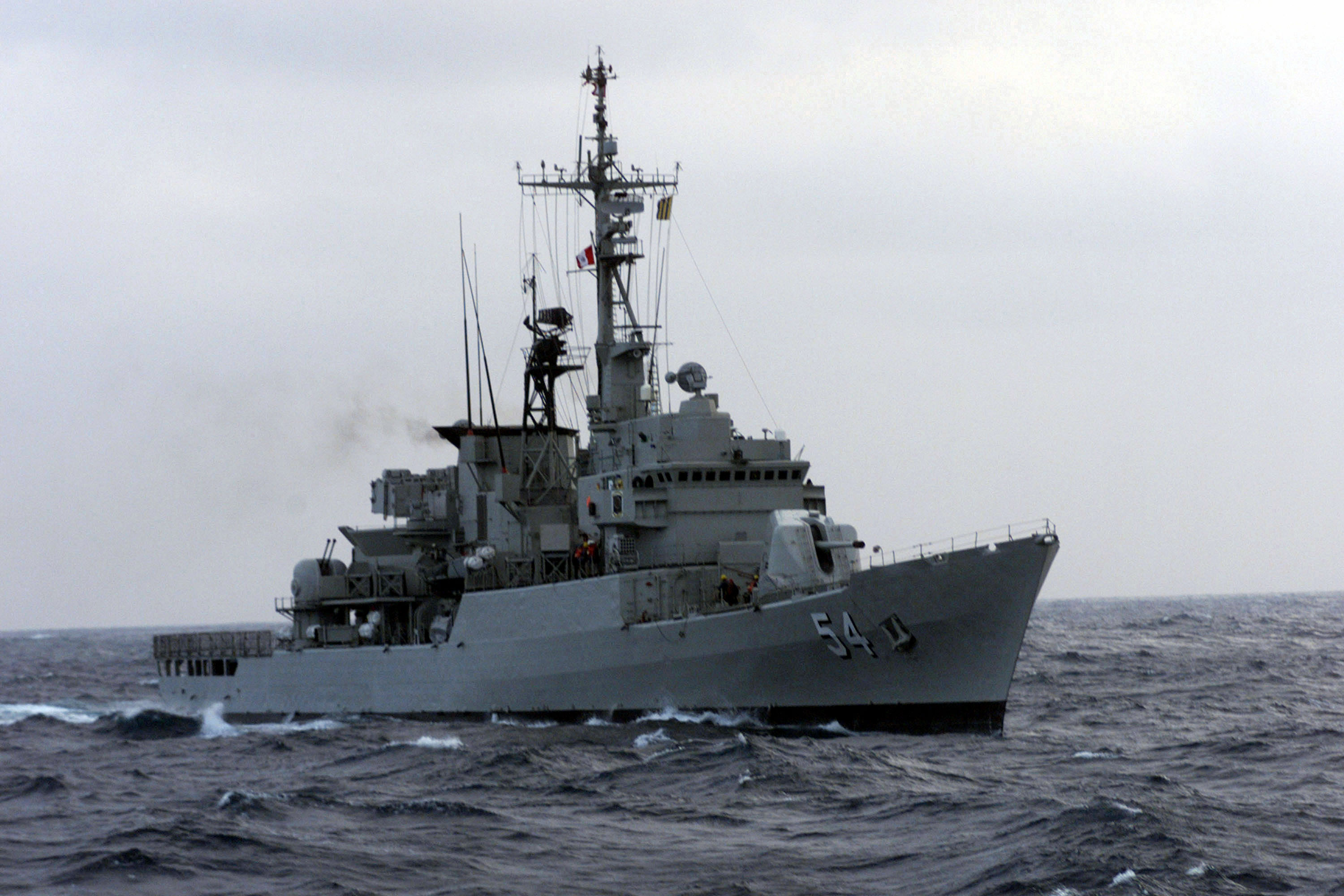
BAP Mariátegui (FM-54) underway during Teamwork South 99

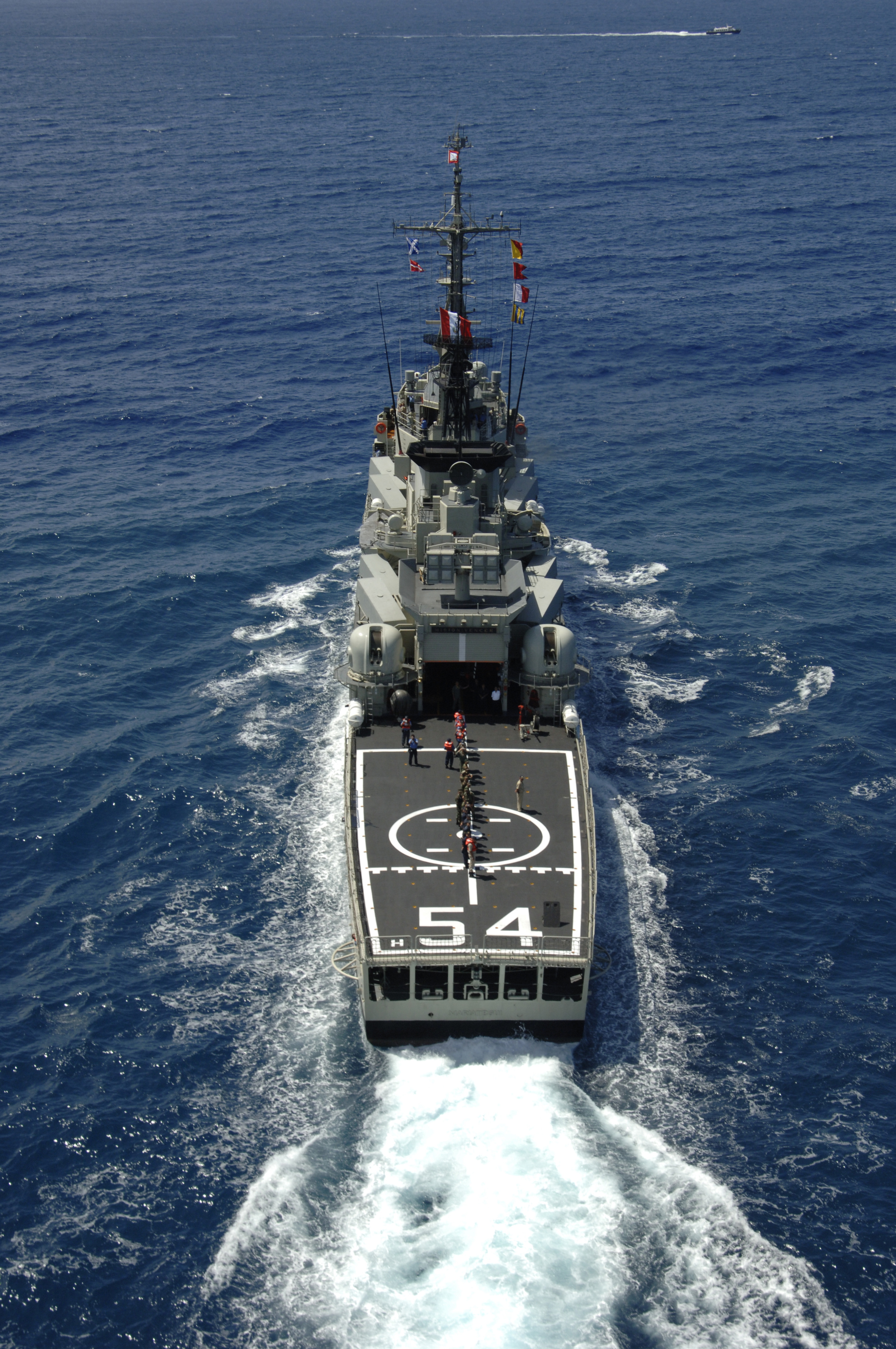
RIMPAC 2006 - BAP Mariátegui (FM-54) departs from Pearl Harbor

== Sources ==
- Rodríguez, John, "Las fragatas Lupo: una breve mirada retrospectiva y perspectivas". Revista de Marina, Year 95, No. 3: 8-32 (July / December 2002).
- Scheina, Robert L. & Smigielski, Adam (1995). "Peru". In Chumbley, Stephen (ed.). Conway's All the World's Fighting Ships, 1947–1995 (revised ed.). Naval Institute Press. pp. 303–307. ISBN 1-55750-132-7.
