= BAP Villavicencio =

1978 Lupo-class frigate

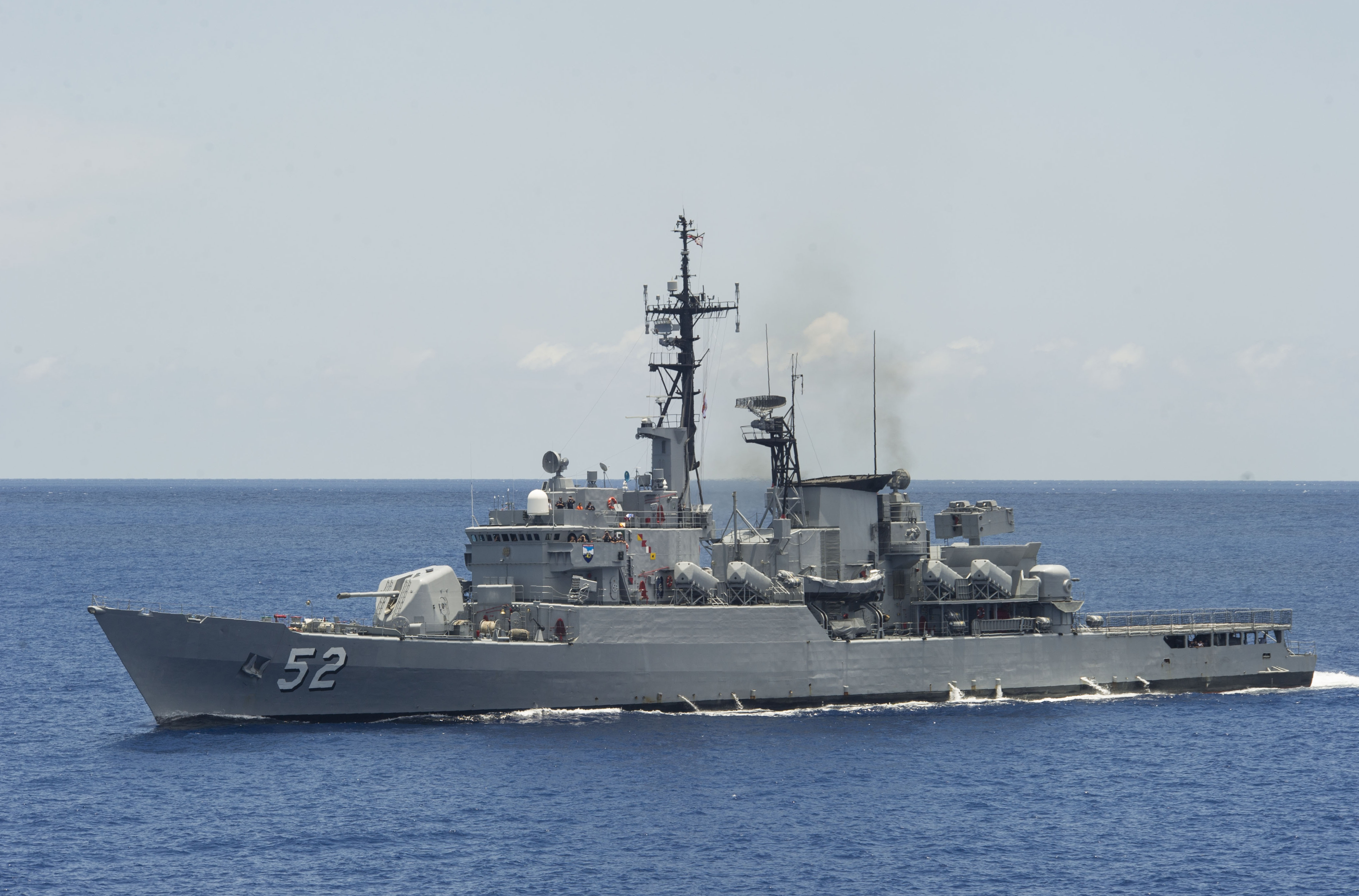
- BAP Villavicencio in June 2014

History

Peru
- Name: Villavicencio
- Namesake: Manuel Villavicencio
- Ordered: 1973
- Builder: Cantieri Navali Riuniti (CNR)
- Laid down: 21 April 1976
- Launched: 7 February 1978
- Commissioned: 25 June 1979
- Home port: Callao
- Identification: FM-52
- Status: Active in service
- Notes: ITU callsign: OBHG

General characteristics
- Class & type: Carvajal-class frigate
- Displacement: 2,206 tonnes (2,525 tonnes full load)
- Length: 113.2 m (371 ft) overall; 106 m (348 ft) waterline
- Beam: 11.3 m (37 ft)
- Draught: 3.7 m (12 ft)
- Propulsion: 2-shaft CODOG system; 2 GE / Fiat LM2500 gas turbines 50,000 shp (37,000 kW); 2 GMT A230-20 diesel engines 7,800 shp (5,800 kW)
- Speed: 35 knots (65 km/h) with gas turbines; 21 knots (39 km/h) with diesel engines
- Range: 4,350 nautical miles (8,056 km) at 16 knots (30 km/h)
- Complement: 199 (22 officers)
- Sensors & processing systems: Selenia IPN-10 action data automation (CMS); 1 RAN-10S early warning radar; 1 RAN-11L/X surface search radar; 2 RTN-10X fire control radar; 2 RTN-20X fire control radar; 1 Decca BridgeMaster II navigation radar; EDO 610E(P) hull sonar
- Electronic warfare & decoys: Lambda intercept system; 2 SCLAR decoy launchers
- Armament: 8 Otomat Mk 2 SSMs; 1 Albatros octuple launcher for Aspide SAM; 2 ILAS-3 triple torpedo tubes; 1 OTO Melara 127mm/54 gun; 2 OTO Melara Twin 40L70 DARDO compact gun
- Aircraft carried: 1 AB-212ASW helicopter
- Aviation facilities: Fixed hangar for 1 medium helicopter

BAP Villavicencio is the second out of four Carvajal-class frigates ordered by the Peruvian Navy in 1973. It was built by the Italian shipbuilder Cantieri Navali Riuniti at its shipyard in Riva Trigoso, Genoa. Delays in the building of the first ship of the class, BAP Carvajal, meant Villavicencio was commissioned first on 25 June 1979 with the pennant number FM-52.

Villavicencio is named after Vice Admiral Manuel Villavicencio (1840–1925) who fought in the War of the Pacific.

== Sources ==
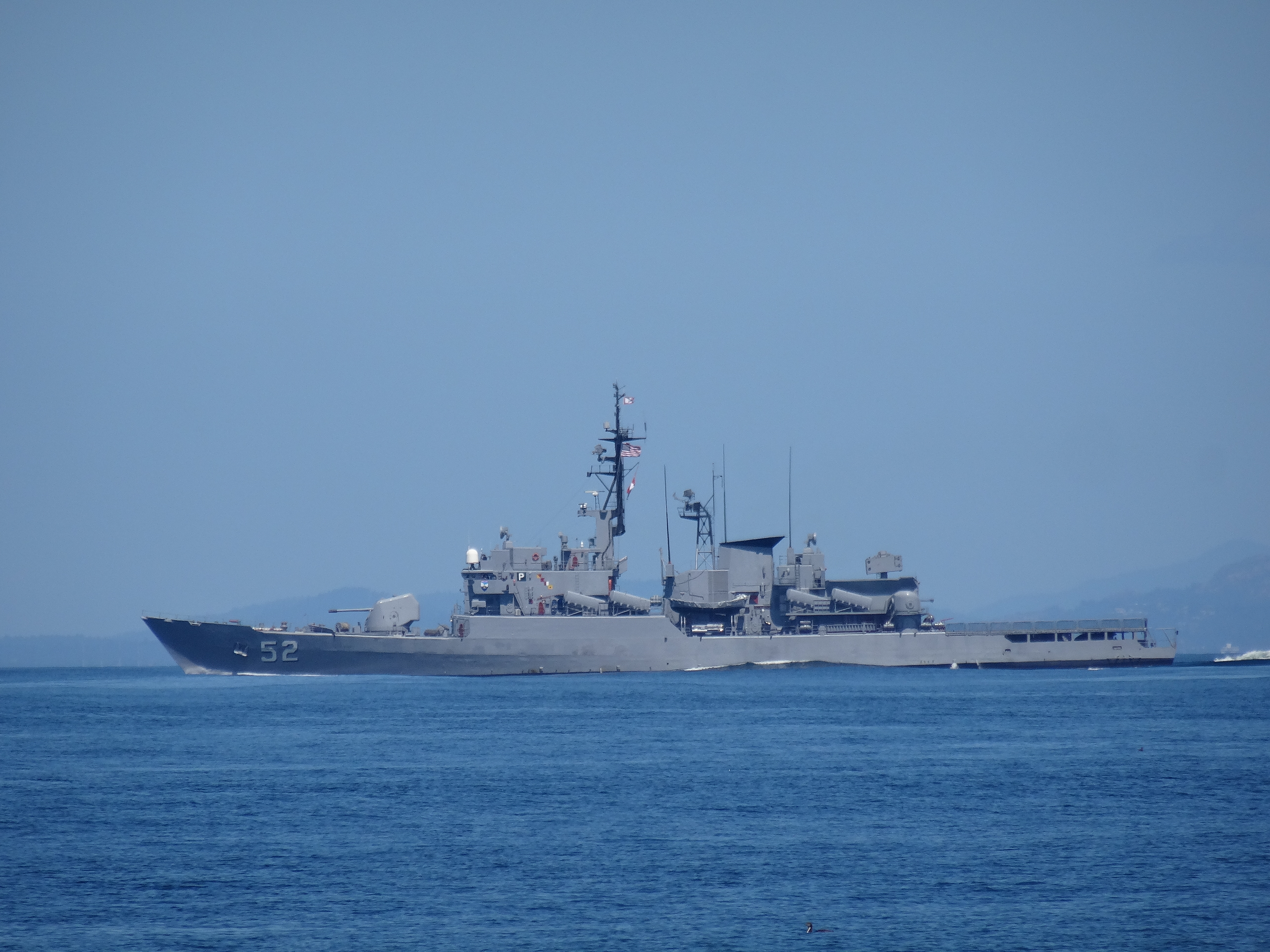
Villavicencio underway off [[Dungeness: Rodríguez, John (July 2002). "Las fragatas Lupo: una breve mirada retrospectiva y perspectivas". Revista de Marina (3). Year 95: 8–32.; Spit]], Washington, June 2015. Note she is flying the American flag.

- Scheina, Robert L. & Smigielski, Adam (1995). "Peru". In Chumbley, Stephen (ed.). Conway's All the World's Fighting Ships, 1947–1995 (revised ed.). Naval Institute Press. pp. 303–307. ISBN 1-55750-132-7.
