= Italian frigate Lupo =

1976 Lupo-class frigate

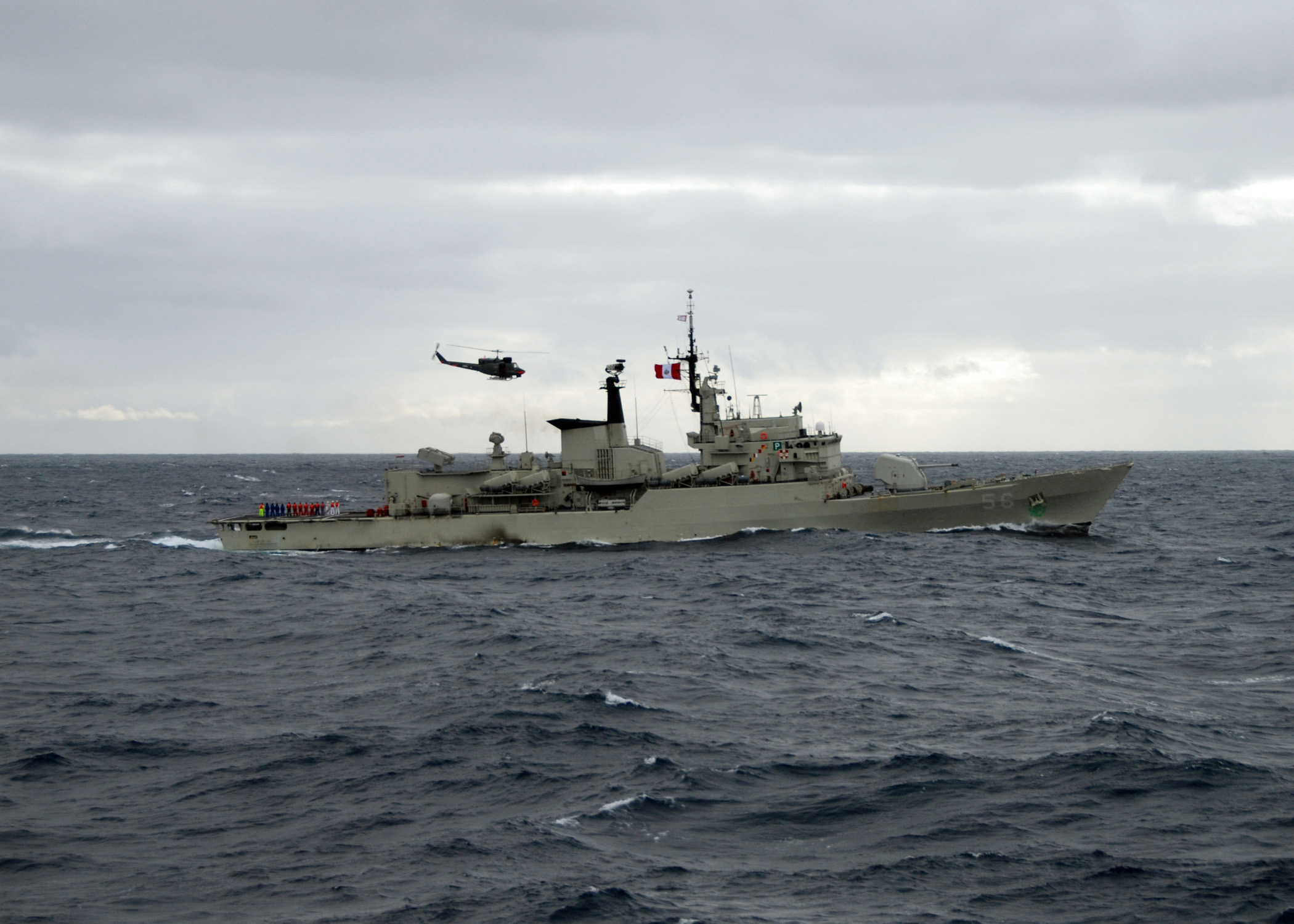
- Palacios of Peru

History

Italy
- Name: Lupo
- Namesake: Lupo
- Builder: Fincantieri, Riva Trigoso, Genoa
- Laid down: 11 October 1974
- Launched: 29 July 1976
- Commissioned: 12 September 1977
- Decommissioned: 2003
- Home port: La Spezia
- Identification: Pennant number: F 564
- Motto: Fulmineo sulla preda
- Fate: Sold to Peruvian Navy

History

Peru
- Name: Palacios
- Commissioned: 3 November 2004
- Home port: Callao
- Identification: Pennant number: FM-56
- Status: Active

General characteristics
- Class & type: Carvajal-class frigate
- Displacement: 2,206 tonnes (2,525 tonnes full load)
- Length: 113.2 m (371 ft 5 in) overall; 106.0 m (347 ft 9 in) waterline
- Beam: 11.3 m (37 ft 1 in)
- Draught: 3.7 m (12 ft 2 in)
- Propulsion: 2-shaft CODOG system; 2 GE / Fiat LM2500 gas turbines 50,000 shp (37,000 kW); 2 GMT A230-20 diesel engines 7,800 shp (5,800 kW)
- Range: 4,350 nmi (8,056 km) at 16 knots (30 km/h)
- Complement: 199 (22 officers)
- Sensors & processing systems: Selenia IPN-10 action data automation (CMS); 1 RAN-10S early warning radar; 1 RAN-11L/X surface search radar; 2 RTN-10X fire control radar; 2 RTN-20X fire control radar; 1 Decca BridgeMaster II navigation radar; EDO 610E(P) hull sonar
- Armament: 8 Otomat Mk 2 SSMs; 1 Albatros octuple launcher for Aspide SAM; 2 ILAS-3 triple torpedo tubes; 1 OTO Melara 127 mm/54 gun; 2 OTO Melara Twin 40L70 DARDO compact gun
- Aircraft carried: 1 AB-212ASW helicopter or; 1 ASH-3D Sea King (deck only)
- Aviation facilities: Fixed hangar for 1 medium helicopter

Lupo (F 564) was the lead ship of the Lupo-class frigate of the Italian Navy. She was sold to Peruvian Navy in the 2000s.

Pelacios (FM-56) is one of eight Carvajal-class frigates of the Peruvian Navy.

== Construction and career ==
=== Italian service ===
The ship initially built for the Italian Navy and was named Lupo with a pennant of F 564. The ship was laid down on 11 October 1974, was launched on 19 July 1976 by the shipyard Riva Trigoso and commissioned in the Italian Navy on 12 September 1977.

In 2003, Lupo was decommissioned and transferred to the Navy of Peru.

=== Peruvian service ===
The Peruvian flag first flew over the ship on 3 November 2004 in La Spezia, Italy while it was being outfitted for Peruvian usage.

For its commissioning process, Palacios sailed from the port of La Spezia in the Mediterranean Sea, across the Atlantic Ocean and into the Pacific Ocean via the Panama Canal, and south to its base in Callao.

== Bibliography ==
- Scheina, Robert L. & Smigielski, Adam (1995). "Peru". In Chumbley, Stephen (ed.). Conway's All the World's Fighting Ships, 1947–1995 (revised ed.). Naval Institute Press. pp. 303–307. ISBN 1-55750-132-7.
