= Italian frigate Sagittario =

Second ship of the Lupo-class frigates of the Italian Navy

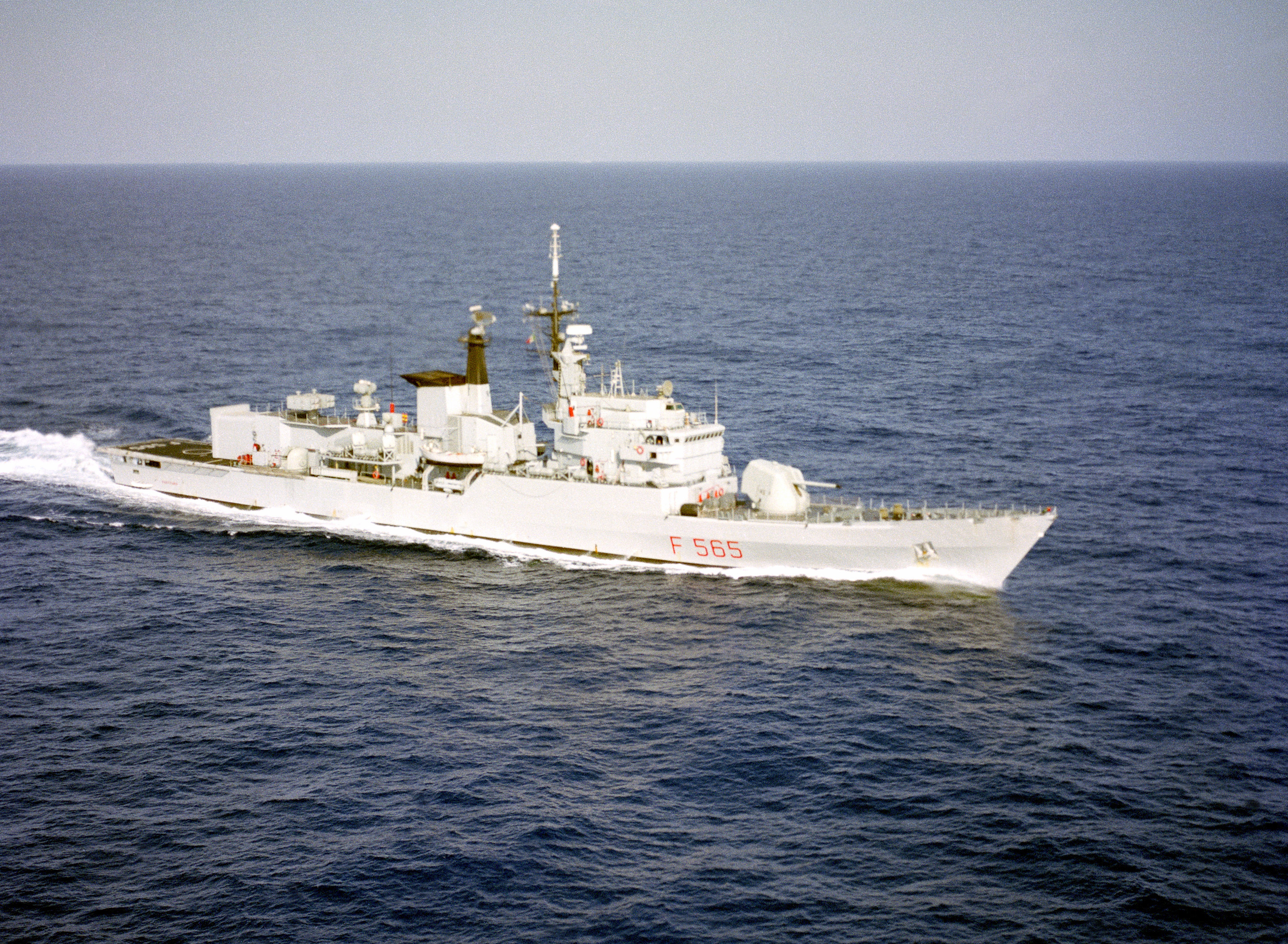
- Sagittario underway in 1983.

History

Italy
- Name: Sagittario
- Namesake: Sagittario
- Builder: Fincantieri, Riva Trigoso, Genoa
- Laid down: 4 February 1976
- Launched: 22 June 1977
- Commissioned: 18 November 1978
- Decommissioned: 31 October 2005
- Home port: La Spezia
- Identification: Pennant number: F 565
- Motto: Non cohibetur sagitta
- Fate: Sold to Peruvian Navy

Peru
- Name: Quiñones
- Namesake: José Quiñones Gonzales
- Builder: Fincatieri, Riva Trigoso, Genoa
- Commissioned: 23 January 2006
- Home port: Callao
- Identification: Pennant number: FM-58
- Motto: Non cohibetur sagitta
- Status: Active

General characteristics
- Class & type: Carvajal-class frigate
- Displacement: 2,206 tonnes (2,525 tonnes full load)
- Length: 113.2 m (371 ft 5 in) overall; 106.0 m (347 ft 9 in) waterline
- Beam: 11.3 m (37 ft 1 in)
- Draught: 3.7 m (12 ft 2 in)
- Propulsion: 2-shaft CODOG system; 2 GE / Fiat LM2500 gas turbines 50,000 shp (37,000 kW); 2 GMT A230-20 diesel engines 7,800 shp (5,800 kW)
- Range: 4,350 nmi (8,056 km) at 16 knots (30 km/h)
- Complement: 199 (22 officers)
- Sensors & processing systems: Selenia IPN-10 action data automation (CMS); 1 RAN-10S early warning radar; 1 RAN-11L/X surface search radar; 2 RTN-10X fire control radar; 2 RTN-20X fire control radar; 1 Decca BridgeMaster II navigation radar; EDO 610E(P) hull sonar
- Armament: 8 Otomat Mk 2 SSMs; 1 Albatros octuple launcher for Aspide SAM; 2 ILAS-3 triple torpedo tubes; 1 OTO Melara 127 mm/54 gun; 2 OTO Melara Twin 40L70 DARDO compact gun
- Aircraft carried: 1 AB-212ASW helicopter or; 1 ASH-3D Sea King (deck only)
- Aviation facilities: Fixed hangar for 1 medium helicopter

Sagittario (pennant number F 565) is the second ship of the Lupo-class frigates of the Italian Navy. She was sold to the Peruvian Navy in the 2000s and renamed Quiñones (with the pennant number FM-58). It is named after José Quiñones Gonzales, a Peruvian pilot who was a hero of the Ecuadorian–Peruvian War who sacrificed himself to destroy an enemy position.

== Construction and career ==
=== Italian service ===
The ship initially built for the Italian Navy and was named Sagittario with a pennant of F 565. The ship was laid down on 4 February 1976, was launched on 22 June 1977 by the shipyard Riva Trigoso and commissioned in the Italian Navy on 18 November 1977.

On 31 October 2005 Sagittario was decommissioned and transferred to the Navy of Peru.

=== Peruvian service ===
The Peruvian flag first flew over the ship on 23 January 2006 in La Spezia, Italy while it was being outfitted for Peruvian usage.

For its commissioning process, Quiñones sailed from the port of La Spezia in the Mediterranean Sea, across the Atlantic Ocean and into the Pacific Ocean via the Panama Canal, and south to its base in Callao where it arrived on 22 January 2007.

The ship has often performed in multi-national military exercises beside the United States Navy and other regional partners.

== Bibliography ==
- Scheina, Robert L. & Smigielski, Adam (1995). "Peru". In Chumbley, Stephen (ed.). Conway's All the World's Fighting Ships, 1947–1995 (revised ed.). Naval Institute Press. pp. 303–307. ISBN 1-55750-132-7.
