= Italian frigate Perseo =

1978 Lupo-class frigate

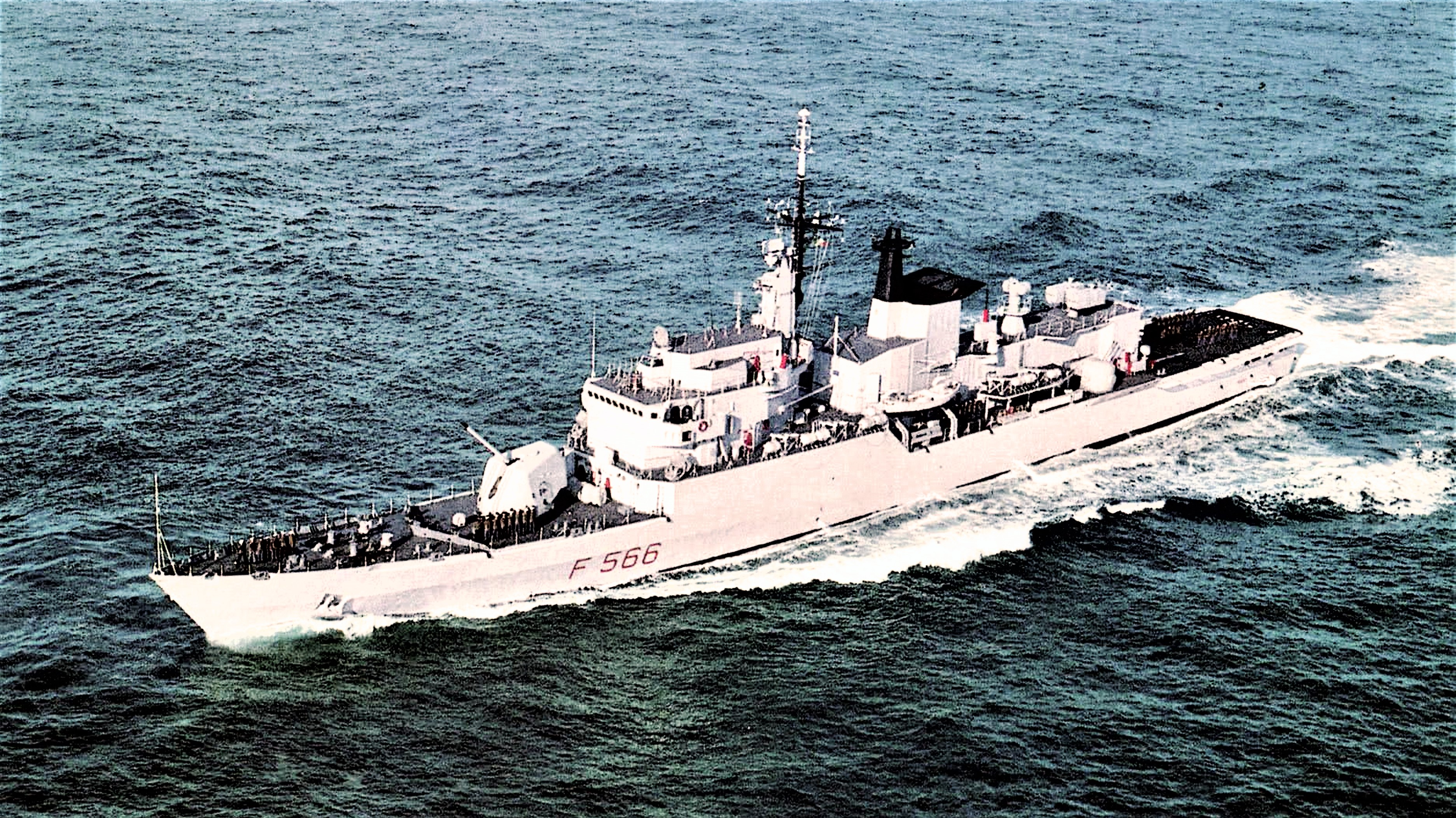
- Perseo underway in 1980s.

History

Italy
- Name: Perseo
- Namesake: Perseo
- Builder: Fincantieri, Riva Trigoso, Genoa
- Laid down: 28 February 1977
- Launched: 12 July 1978
- Commissioned: 1 March 1980
- Decommissioned: 2003
- Home port: La Spezia
- Identification: Pennant number: F 566
- Motto: Vincera' chi vorrà vincere
- Fate: Sold to Peruvian Navy

Peru
- Name: Coronel Bolognesi
- Namesake: Colonel Francisco Bolognesi
- Builder: Fincatieri, Riva Trigoso, Genoa
- Commissioned: 31 October 2005
- Home port: Callao
- Identification: Pennant number: FM-57
- Motto: Valiente y Audaz
- Status: Active

General characteristics
- Class & type: Carvajal-class frigate
- Displacement: 2,206 tonnes (2,525 tonnes full load)
- Length: 113.2 m (371 ft 5 in) overall; 106.0 m (347 ft 9 in) waterline
- Beam: 11.3 m (37 ft 1 in)
- Draught: 3.7 m (12 ft 2 in)
- Propulsion: 2-shaft CODOG system; 2 GE / Fiat LM2500 gas turbines 50,000 shp (37,000 kW); 2 GMT A230-20 diesel engines 7,800 shp (5,800 kW)
- Range: 4,350 nmi (8,056 km) at 16 knots (30 km/h)
- Complement: 199 (22 officers)
- Sensors & processing systems: Selenia IPN-10 action data automation (CMS); 1 RAN-10S early warning radar; 1 RAN-11L/X surface search radar; 2 RTN-10X fire control radar; 2 RTN-20X fire control radar; 1 Decca BridgeMaster II navigation radar; EDO 610E(P) hull sonar
- Armament: 4 Exocet MM40 Block 3 SSMs; 1 Albatros octuple launcher for Aspide SAM; 2 ILAS-3 triple torpedo tubes; 1 OTO Melara 127 mm/54 gun; 2 OTO Melara Twin 40L70 DARDO compact gun
- Aircraft carried: 1 AB-212ASW helicopter or; 1 ASH-3D Sea King (deck only)
- Aviation facilities: Fixed hangar for 1 medium helicopter

Perseo (F 566) is the third ship of the Lupo-class frigate of the Italian Navy. She was sold to Peruvian Navy in the 2000s.

Coronel Bolognesi (FM-57) is one of eight Carvajal-class frigates of the Peruvian Navy.

== Construction and career ==
=== Italian service ===
The ship initially built for the Italian Navy and was named Perseo with a pennant of F 566. The ship was laid down on 28 February 1977, was launched on 12 July 1978 by the shipyard Riva Trigoso and commissioned in the Italian Navy on 1 March 1980.

At the beginning of the 1980s the ship took part, in September 1982, in the ITALCON mission for peace operations in Lebanon, as part of the UN mission UNIFIL. At the end of the decade the ship was then engaged in the Persian Gulf, during the Iran-Iraq conflict. Sailing in hostile waters are very dangerous and the Italian motor ship Jolly Rubino, attacked by the Iranian, this prompted the Navy to send a contingent to the area, made up of frigates, logistic units and minesweepers engaged in escort operations on the ship merchant and landmine clearance.

In 2003, Perseo was decommissioned and transferred to the Navy of Peru.

=== Peruvian service ===
She was commissioned on 31 October 2005. For its commissioning process, Coronel Bolognesi sailed from the port of La Spezia in the Mediterranean Sea, across the Atlantic Ocean and into the Pacific Ocean via the Panama Canal, and south to its base in Callao.

On 30 September 2021, Bolognesi successfully test fired the Exocet MM40 Block 3 anti-ship missile for the first time since its introduction to Peruvian Navy in 2016.

== Bibliography ==
- Scheina, Robert L. & Smigielski, Adam (1995). "Peru". In Chumbley, Stephen (ed.). Conway's All the World's Fighting Ships, 1947–1995 (revised ed.). Naval Institute Press. pp. 303–307. ISBN 1-55750-132-7.
