= Servicios Industriales de la Marina =

Peruvian shipyard company

Servicios Industriales de la Marina S.A.

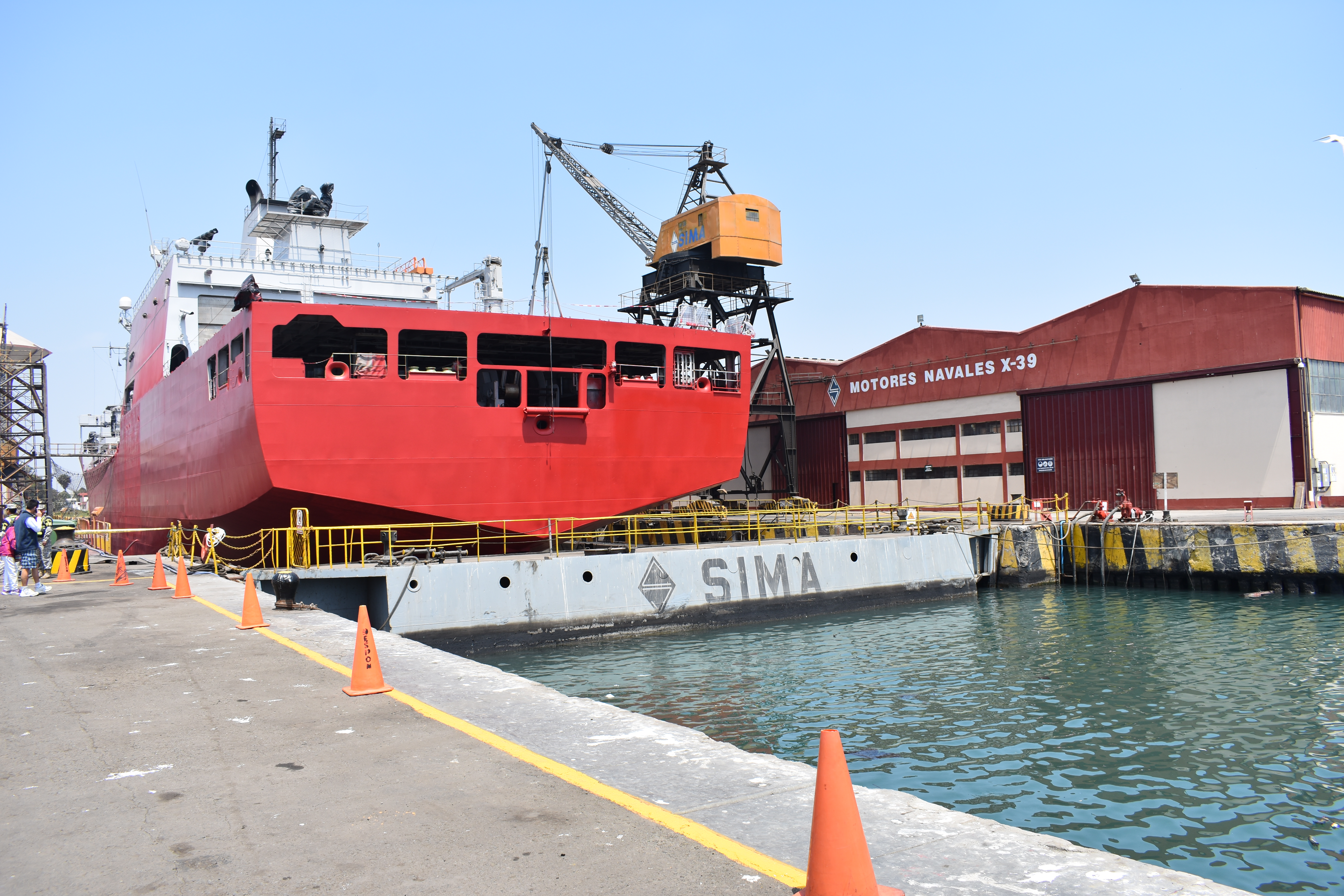
- SIMA Shipyard
- Type: State company
- Industry: Metalworking, Defence, Shipbuilding
- Founded: 14 February 1950; 76 years ago
- Headquarters: Callao, Peru
- Area served: Peru
- Key people: Mauro Daniel Cacho de Armero (President); Federico Javier Bravo de Rueda Delgado (CEO)
- Owners: Peruvian Navy
- Number of employees: >2,000
- Subsidiaries: SIMA Callao; SIMA Chimbote; SIMA Iquitos
- Website: www.sima.com.pe

Servicios Industriales de la Marina S.A. (Shipyard Marine Industrial Services), well known as SIMA or SIMA PERU S.A., is a Peruvian shipyard that operates as a state owned company established under private law in 1950 pursuing the activities of the former Naval Factory founded in 1845, and continually extending its operational capacity, first to the shipbuilding which SIMA pioneered in South America and then to the greatest metalworking structures manufacture, contributing to the defense and socio-economic development of Peru. The SIMA mainly serve the Navy of Peru as well as domestic and foreign private clients through a wide range of products.

== History ==
On 22 May 1845 during the first government of President Ramón Castilla, the State Factory in the city of Callao was established. Then named Naval Factory, this facility would become a leading establishment of its kind in South America. Such decision to establish this factory was due to the fact that Peru had taken steps to acquire the steamship Rimac, first steam warship of the national navy at that time in the year of 1844, making it necessary to have an establishment where maintenance and repair could be provided.

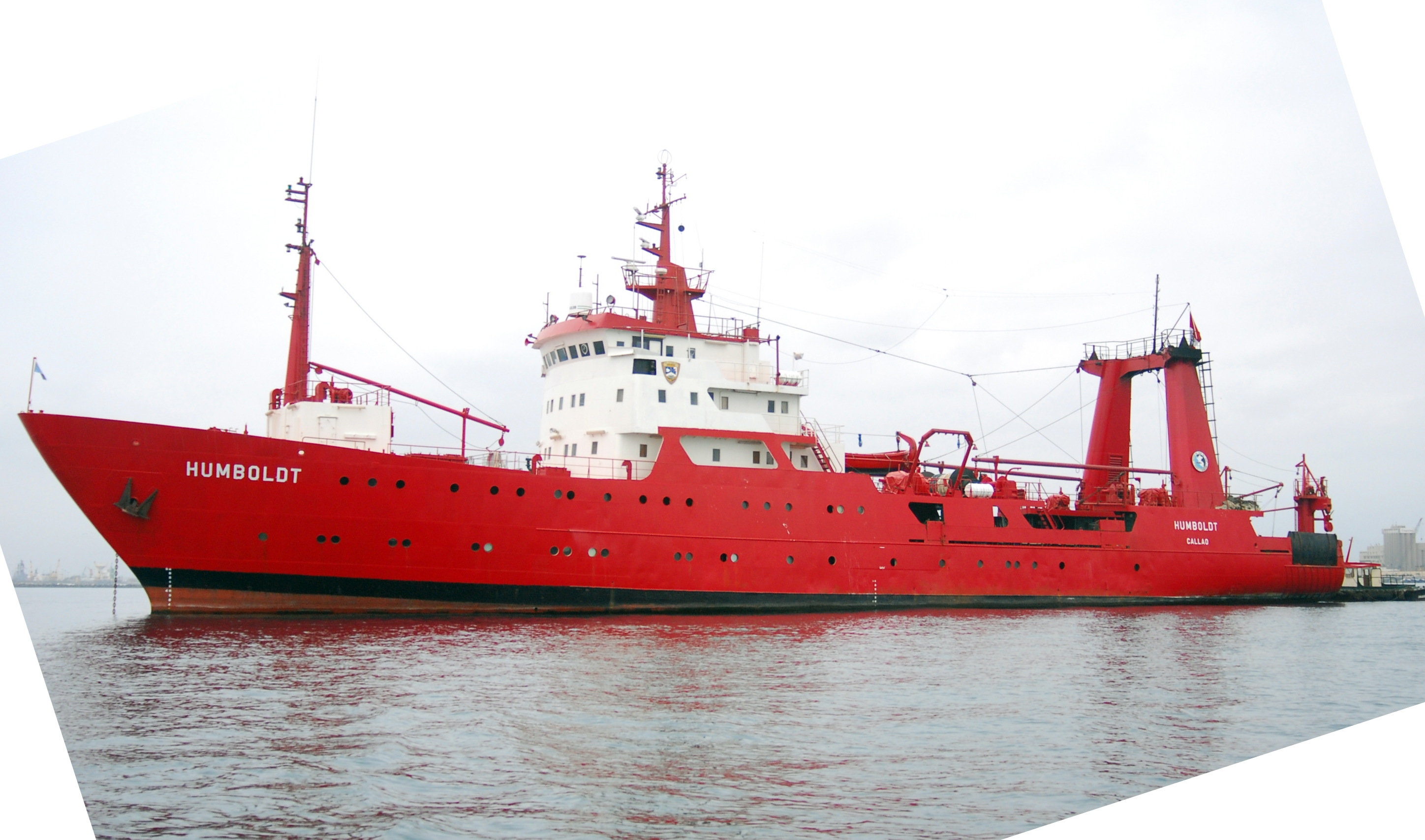
B.I.C. Humboldt, Peruvian oceanographic research vessel built in 1978 by SIMA

On 7 August 1861 by orders of the President of the Republic, General Juan Antonio Pezet, the Naval Factory was entirely taken over by the Navy, arranging the creation of the Naval Factory Superintendence, thus achieving performance optimization. Years later the Naval Factory made history participating in the construction of the first South American armored ship monitor Victoria and the conversion of steamship Loa into an armored vehicle; installing machinery, artillery and hull armor. Both ships were part of the national fleet that confronted the Spanish fleet during the naval Battle of Callao in 1866.

During the Pacific War the Naval Factory was actively engaged in the national efforts to confront the military conflict meeting the requirements of both the Navy and the Army. At the end of the war, its facilities were destroyed.

In the post war years, few of the ships possessed by the Navy were repaired in the state-owned floating dock of the "Compañía Peruana de Vapores y Dique del Callao" until 1930, date on winch it sank, forcing the Navy to send its ships to the Panama Canal zone, among other foreign shipyards.

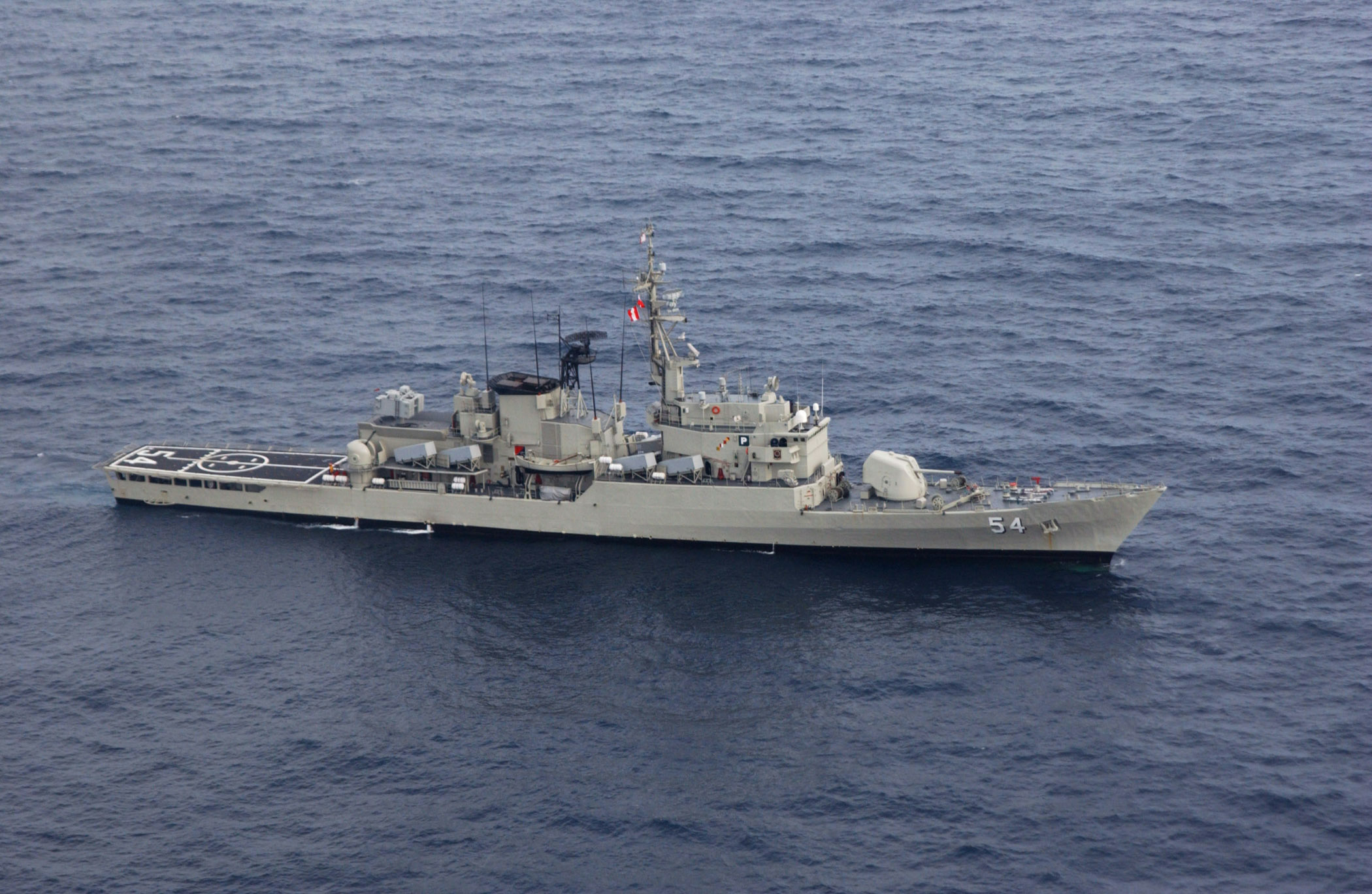
BAP Mariátegui, frigate built in 1984 by SIMA

In a situation of dependence on foreign shipyards, the Navy of Peru took up again naval repair activities to serve their small-sized vessels, creating the Naval Station of San Lorenzo in 1921. In 1925, with the arrival of submarines Type "R", the Naval Station of San Lorenzo was modernized installing machinery at the workshops and a modern shipyard with capacity of 800 tns bollard pull, inaugurated with the entry of torpedo-boat destroyer Rodriguez.

On 14 February 1950 during the government of Manuel A. Odría, Servicios Industriales de la Marina (Marine Industrial Services) known as SIMA was created over the base of the Industrial Department of the Navy Dockyard, assigning the dry dock administration and workshops in order to serve the Peruvian Navy, the National Merchant Marine and private entities successfully. With creation of SIMA under administration of the Navy, the decision to get into the shipbuilding activity was made. Preparation of the shipyard for that purpose began. Berth number one, mould-loft, shipbuilding workshop among others were constructed.

On 25 March 1999 Law N° 27073 was enacted, regulating activities of the company within the scope of the defense sector and paying particular attention to the Navy of Peru as well as individuals customers in order to generate profits to self-finance its own development and fulfill its role in society.

== Products ==
=== Ships built ===
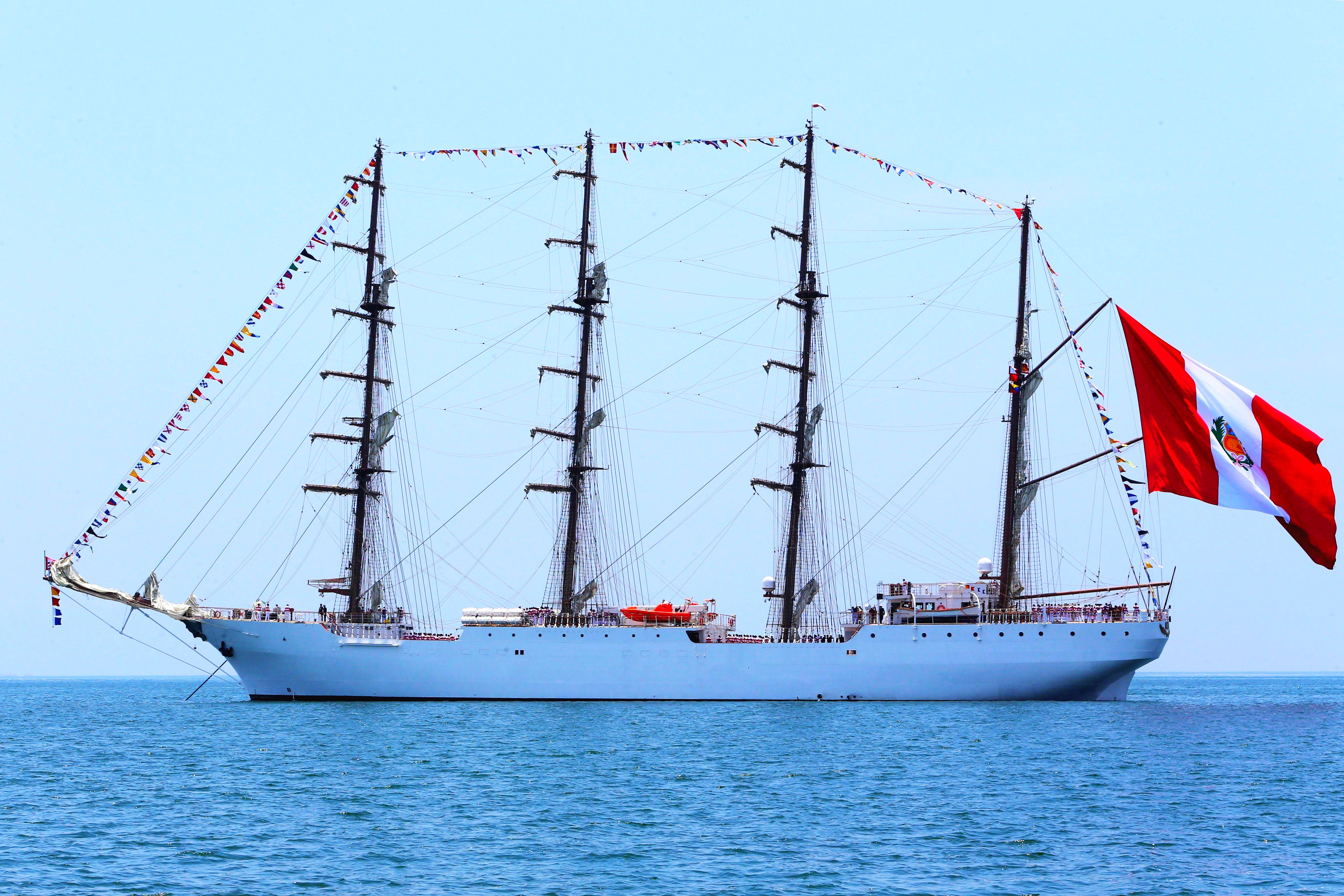
BAP Unión, sail training ship built in 2014 by SIMA

Ships built at the SIMA yard include:

- BAP Zorritos, Oil tanker, launched in 1960
- BIC Humboldt, Oceanographic research ship, launched in 1978
- BAP Montero (FM-53), guided missile frigate, launched in 1982
- BAP Mariátegui (FM-54), guided missile frigate, launched in 1984
- BAP Unión (BEV-161), Sail training ship launched in 2014
- two balsawood rafts, for the Kon-Tiki2 Expedition, 2015
- BAP Rio Pativilca (PM-204), patrol boat, launched in 2016
- BAP Rio Cañete (PM-205), patrol boat, launched in 2016
- BAP Rio Piura (PM-206), patrol boat, launched in 2017
- BAP Rio Quilca (PM-207), patrol boat, launched in 2017
- BAP Rio Tumbes (PM-208), patrol boat, launched in 2020
- BAP Rio Locumba (PM-209), patrol boat, launched in 2020
- BAP Pisco (AMP-156), multipurpose ship, launched in 2017

=== Firearms ===
- MGP-84
