= SIFOREX =

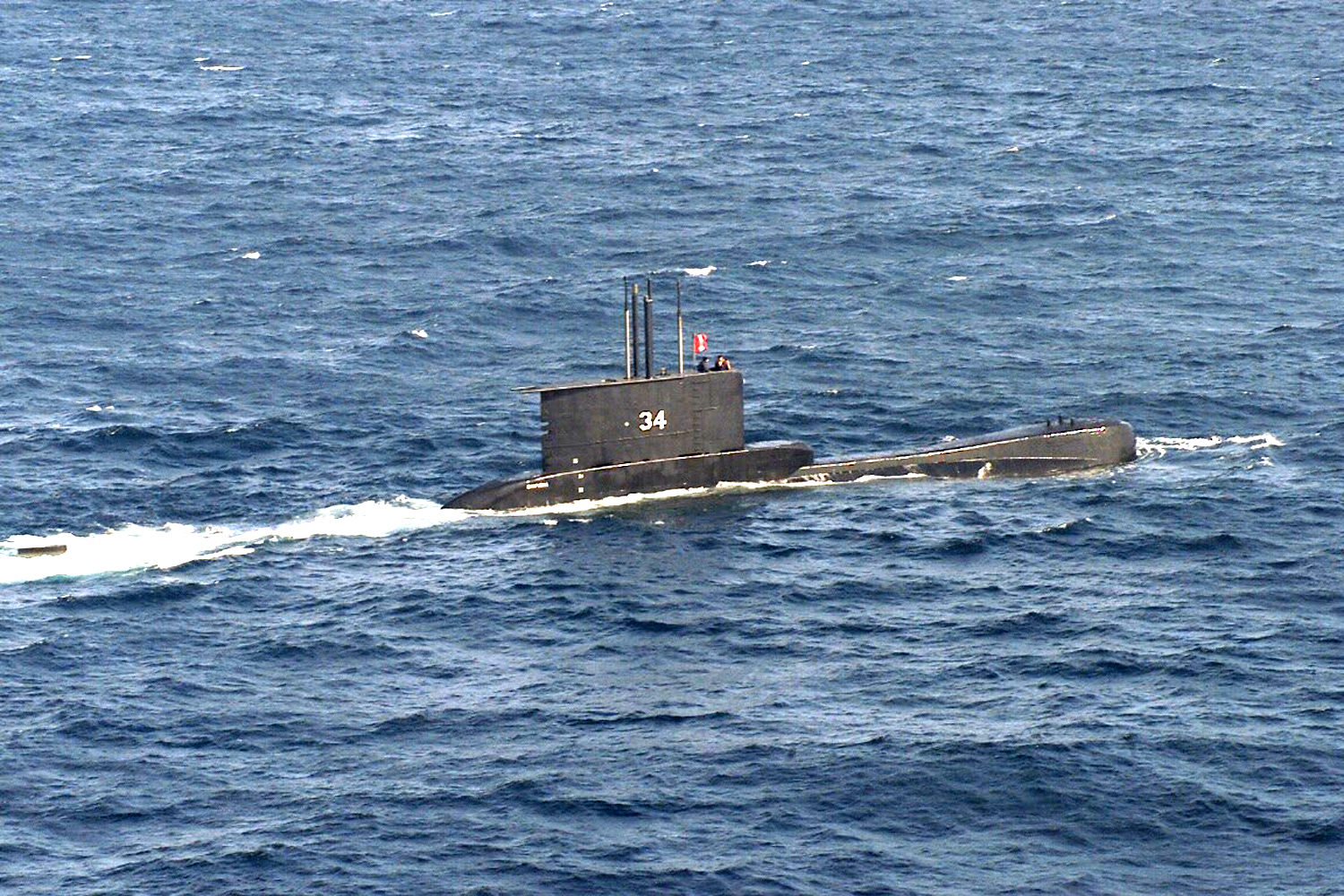
SIFOREX 2004 - BAP Chipana (SS-34)

SIFOREX, Silent Force Exercise, is an advanced anti-submarine warfare (ASW) bilateral exercise hosted and administered by the Peruvian Navy with participation of the United States Navy, along with observers from Columbia, Argentina, and Brazil. Its main purpose is to provide advanced anti-submarine training with diesel submarines. The event has been held annually in July in Callao, Peru since 2001, under the leadership of the Submarine Command of the Peruvian Navy, headquartered at the Base Naval del Callao (Callao Naval Base).
