= Lupo-class frigate =

Class of Italian frigates

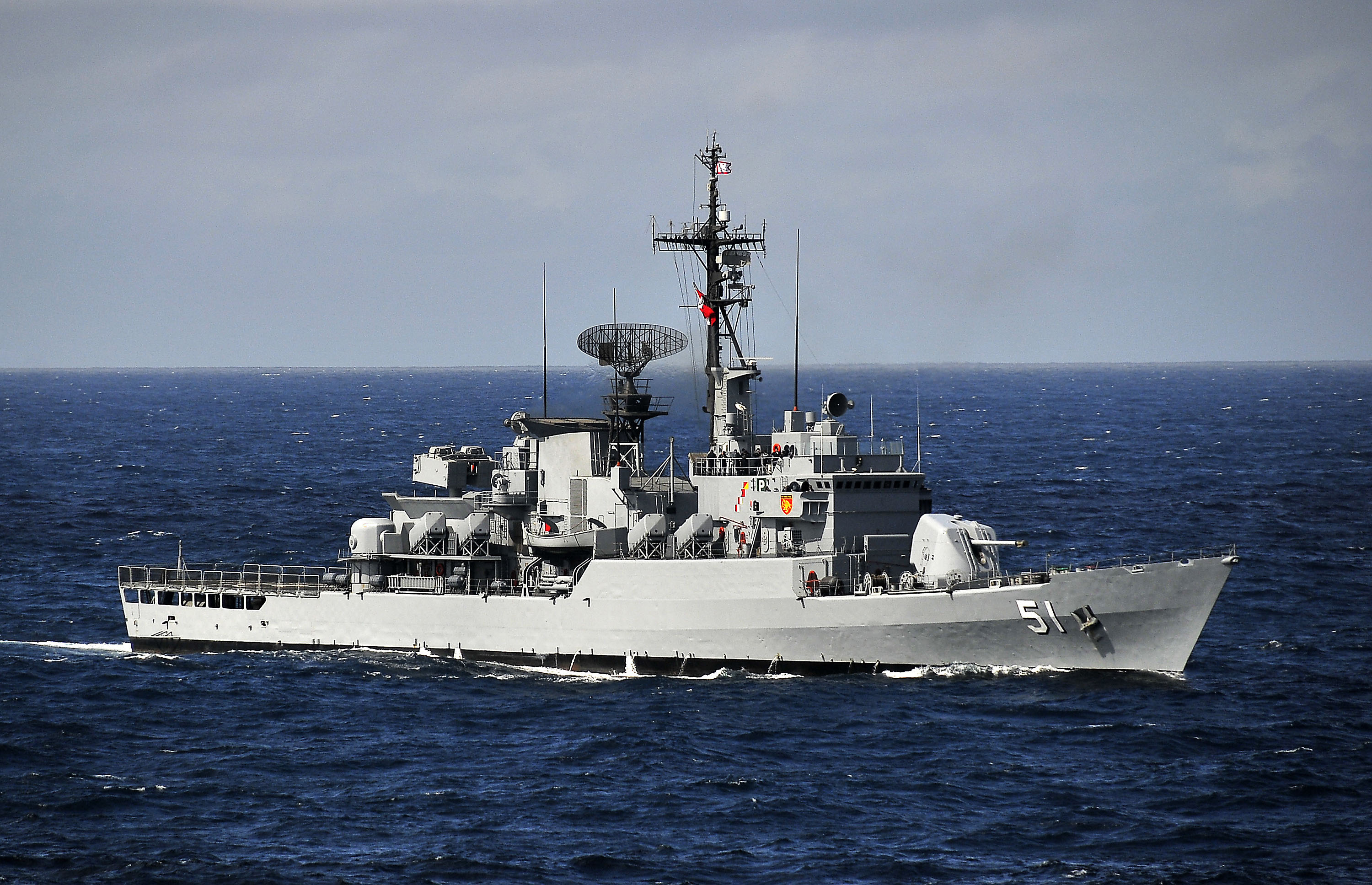
- Peruvian Navy frigate BAP Carvajal participating in Southern Seas 2010

Class overview
- Name: Lupo class
- Builders: Cantieri Navali Riuniti (CNR); Fincantieri; SIMA
- Operators: Italian Navy (former); Peruvian Navy; Bolivarian Navy of Venezuela
- Preceded by: Alpino class
- Succeeded by: Maestrale class
- Subclasses: Carvajal class; Mariscal Sucre class; Artigliere (Soldati) class
- In commission: 1977
- Planned: 18
- Completed: 18
- Active: 10
- Laid up: 5
- Retired: 8
- Scrapped: 3

General characteristics
- Type: Guided-missile frigate
- Displacement: 2.506 t (2.466 long tons) full load
- Length: 113.2 m (371 ft) LOA
- Beam: 11.3 m (37 ft)
- Draft: 3.7 m (12 ft)
- Propulsion: - CODOG scheme; - 2 x shaft; - 2 x GE / Fiat LM2500 gas turbines 50,000 shp (37,000 kW); - 2 x diesel engines Grandi Motori Trieste GMT A230-20 diesel engines 7,800 shp (5.8 MW); - 4 x diesel engine generators Grandi Motori Trieste GMT 236SS, 3,000 kW (4,000 shp)
- Speed: 35 kn (65 km/h) with gas turbines; 21 kn (39 km/h) with diesels
- Range: 4,300 nmi (8,000 km) at 16 kn (30 km/h)
- Complement: 185 (20 officers)
- Sensors & processing systems: - Selenia SADOC 2 combat management system; - 1 x Selenia SPS-774 (RAN-10S) early warning radar; - 1 x Selenia SPQ-2F CORA OTH surface search radar; - 1 x Selenia SPS-702 (or RAN-11L/X) air/surface search radar; - 1 x Selenia SPG-70 (RTN-10X) fire control radar; - 1 x Raytheon Mk 95 fire control radar; - 2 x Selenia SPG-74 (RTN-20X) fire control radar; - 1 x GEM Elettronica AN/SPN-748 navigation radar; - Raytheon DE 1160B (SQS-56) hull sonar
- Electronic warfare & decoys: - SLR-4 ESM system; - SLQ-D ECM system; - AN/SLQ-25 Nixie torpedo decoy; - 2 x Breda SCLAR decoy launchers
- Armament: - 8 x Otomat Mk 2 SSMs; - 1 x Mk.29 octuple launcher for Sea Sparrow/Aspide SAM; - 2 x Mark 32 triple torpedo tubes; - 1 x OTO Melara 127/54 mm gun; - 2 x OTO Melara Twin 40L70 DARDO compact gun
- Aircraft carried: 1 AB-212ASW helicopter
- Aviation facilities: Flight deck: 25.2 m × 11.3 m (83 ft × 37 ft); Telescopic hangar for 1 medium helicopter.

The Lupo class is a class of frigates built by Cantieri Navali Riuniti (CNR) for the Italian Navy. Designed as multipurpose warships with an emphasis on anti-surface warfare (ASuW), they have enjoyed some success in the export market, being acquired by the navies of Peru and Venezuela. A small run of a slightly updated version is known as the Soldati class.

== Design ==
In the early 1970s, the Italian Navy faced an increased Soviet naval presence in the Mediterranean Sea which constituted a threat to its sea lines of communication as well as to its extensive coastline. To parry this menace, Italy started a naval expansion program which included frigates focused on ASuW (Lupo class) and on ASW (Maestrale class).

For the first part of the requirement, CNR presented a design for a 2,500-ton frigate with a high speed and a heavy weapons load. The ship employed a CODOG propulsion plant to achieve 35 knots, making it one of the fastest warships at the time. Armament included 8 SSMs, 8 SAMs, several gun systems, 2 triple torpedo tubes and an ASW helicopter, which was equivalent to that carried by larger warships. Lupo-class frigates have a crew of around 200.

== Italian Navy ==
The Italian Navy commissioned four Lupo-class frigates between 1977 and 1980. These ships were deployed to the Persian Gulf first as escorts for tankers during the last stages of the Iran–Iraq War (1987–1988) and then as part of the Coalition forces during the 1990–1991 Gulf War. After these operations, the whole class underwent modernization which included fitting an SPS-702 CORA surface search radar and SATCOM equipment. After two decades in service, the four Italian Lupo-class frigates were decommissioned and sold to Peru in the early 2000s.

In 1996 four new Lupo-class frigates which had been built for Iraq in 1985–87, were incorporated into the Italian Navy as the Artigliere class. These ships feature a telescopic hangar; they were refitted as patrol ships and changes made for Italian service included the removal of all ASW equipment. The four ships are Artigliere ("artilleryman" - pennant F 582), Aviere ("airman" - F 583), Bersagliere ("sharpshooter" - F 584) and Granatiere ("grenadier" - F 585), and are used in fleet escort or long-range patrolling duties.

=== Ships ===
Italian Navy Lupo class
Pennant number	Ship	Builder	Hull number	Laid down	Launched	Commissioned	Motto	Fate
F 564	Lupo	Cantieri Navali Riuniti, Riva Trigoso	300	11 October 1974	29 July 1976	12 September 1977	Fulmineo sulla preda	Transferred to Peru, renamed Palacios
F 565	Sagittario	Cantieri Navali Riuniti, Riva Trigoso	301	4 February 1976	22 June 1977	18 November 1978	Non cohibetur sagitta	Transferred to Peru, renamed Quiñones
F 566	Perseo	Cantieri Navali Riuniti, Riva Trigoso	302	28 February 1977	12 July 1978	1 March 1980	Vincerà chi vorrà vincere	Transferred to Peru, renamed Coronel Bolognesi
F 567	Orsa	Cantieri Navali Riuniti, Muggiano	303	1 August 1977	1 March 1979	1 March 1980	Fortitude Fortior	Transferred to Peru, renamed Aguirre

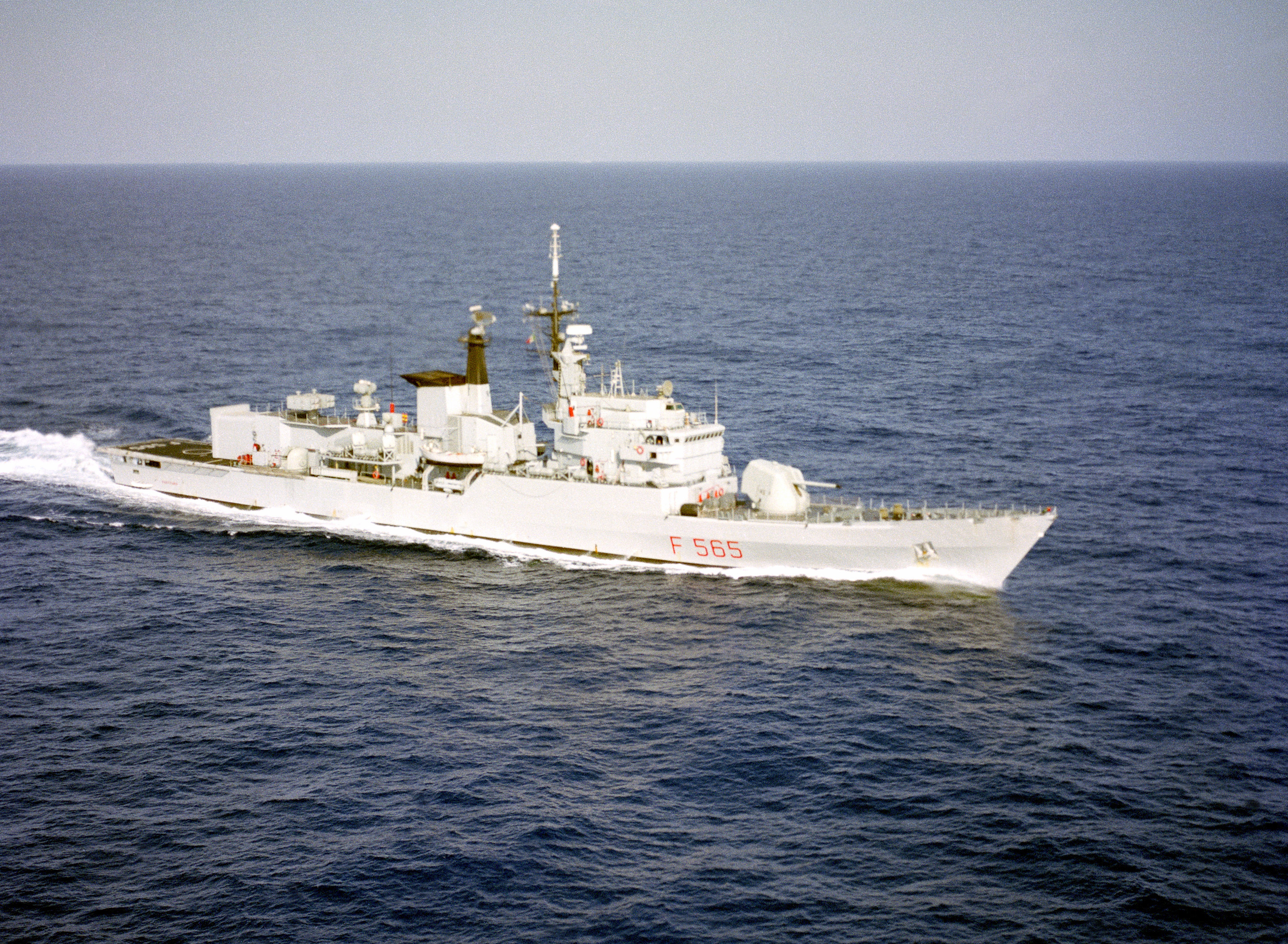
A starboard view of the Italian Lupo-class frigate Sagittario underway during exercise Distant Drum in 1983

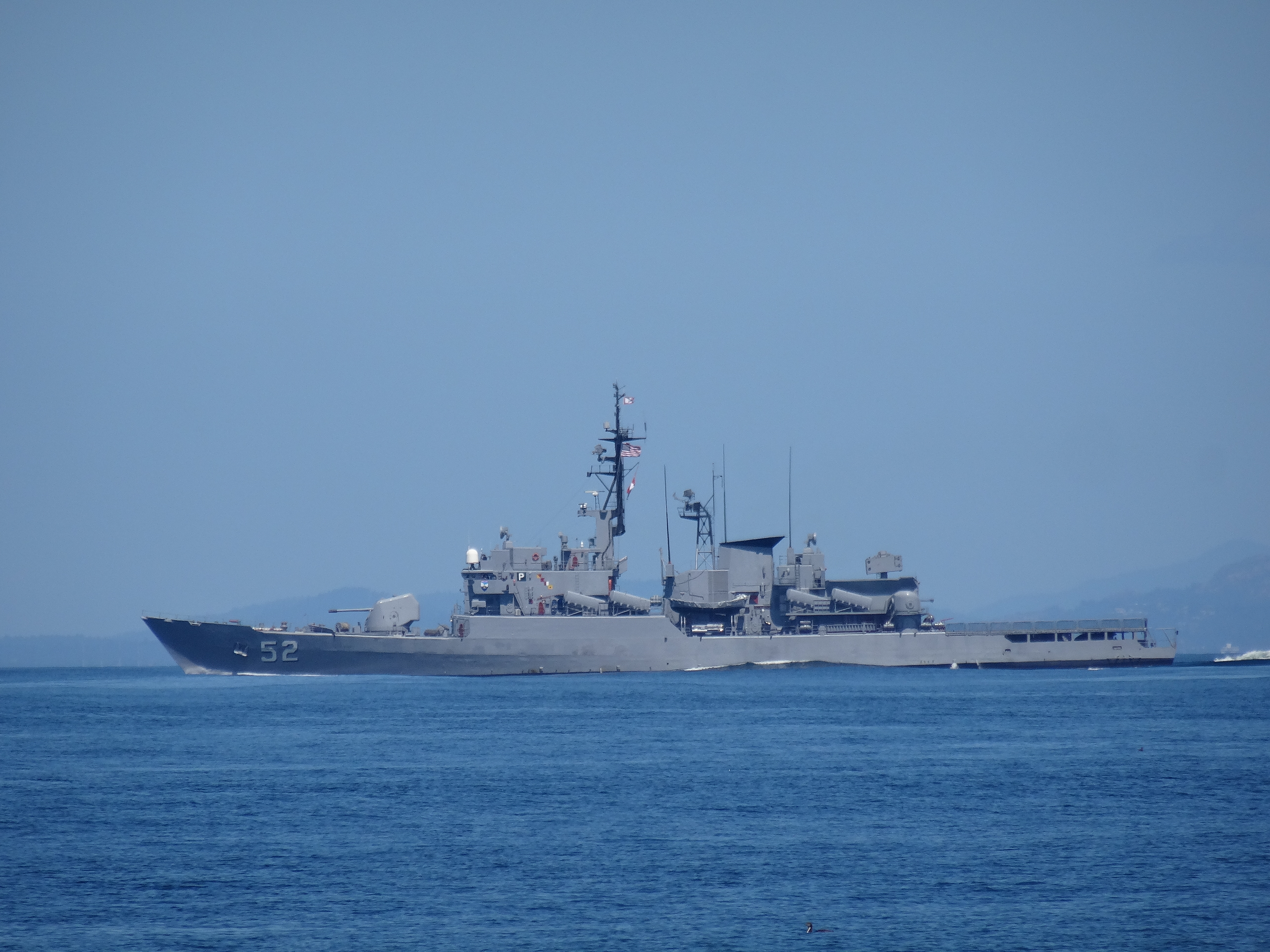
BAP Villavicencio underway off Dungeness Spit, Washington, June 2015

=== Soldati-class patrol frigate ===
Iraq ordered four Lupo-class frigates from CNR in 1980 as part of a naval expansion program just before the Iran–Iraq War. These ships, which feature a telescopic hangar were completed between 1985 and 1987. Due to restrictions on arm sales to Iraq because of the Iran-Iraq War placed by the Italian prime minister Bettino Craxi, the ships remained interned in Italy until the end of that war in 1988. Iraqi President Saddam Hussein then tried to renegotiate the price of these ships (and the other ships purchased from Italy), claiming he should receive a discount due to the delay in delivery of the ships. Negotiations and court proceedings were still ongoing when Iraq invaded Kuwait in 1990 and a new arms embargo against Iraq was placed by the United Nations, again blocking the sale. In 1993 all of them were seized and, after being refitted as patrol ships, incorporated to the Italian Navy as the Soldati class in 1996. Changes made for Italian service included the removal of all ASW equipment. The four ships are Artigliere (pennant F 582), Aviere (F 583), Bersagliere (F 584) and Granatiere (F 585), and are used in fleet escort or long range patrolling duties. The Philippines considered acquiring the Soldati class in 2012.

F582 and F584 were scrapped in Aliaga in 2024.

Italian Navy Soldati class
Pennant number	Ship	Builder	Hull number	Laid down	Launched	Commissioned	Decommissioned	Motto
F 582	Artigliere (ex-Hittin)	Fincantieri, Ancona	903	31 March 1982	27 July 1983	28 October 1994	13 December 2013	Primi Velitum
F 583	Aviere (ex-Thi Qar)	Fincantieri, Ancona	904	3 September 1982	19 December 1984	4 January 1995	2 October 2019	Virtute Siderum Tenus
F 584	Bersagliere (ex-Al Yarmouk)	Fincantieri, Riva Trigoso	905	12 March 1984	18 April 1985	8 November 1995	17 April 2018	Pro Patria
F 585	Granatiere (ex-Al Qadisiya)	Fincantieri, Ancona	906	1 December 1983	1 June 1985	20 March 1996	30 September 2015	A me le guardie

== Peruvian Navy ==
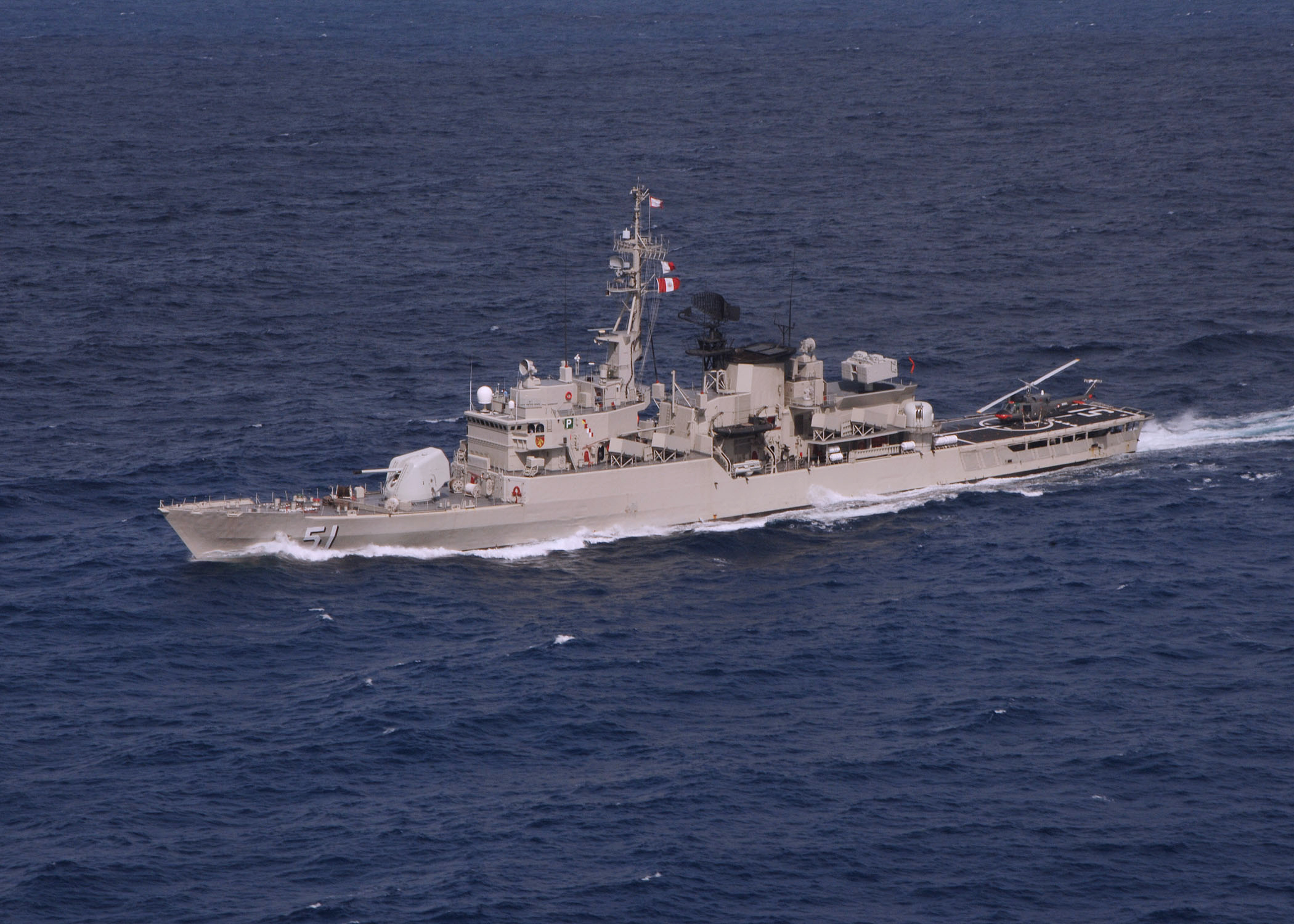
Peruvian frigate BAP Carvajal maneuvers through the Caribbean Sea during UNITAS 46-05

Peru became involved early in the Lupo-class frigate program, ordering four ships in 1973. The Peruvian ships were built to a modified design which included different radars, Aspide instead of Sea Sparrow SAMs, and a fixed instead of a telescopic hangar. The first two were built by CNR at its shipyard in Riva Trigoso, Genoa, and commissioned in 1979.

Construction work for the second pair was carried out under license by SIMA (Servicio Industrial de la Marina, Navy Industrial Service) at Callao, with the ships commissioning in 1984 and 1987. Of the Peruvian Lupos, BAP Carvajal (FM-51), BAP Mariátegui (FM-54), BAP Villavicencio (FM-52) and BAP Montero (now BAP Almirante Grau) (FM-53) had their flight decks extended to allow ASH-3D Sea King helicopters to land and refuel, even though they cannot be housed in the ship's hangar.

In November 2004 other ex-Italian Lupo-class vessels were incorporated into the Peruvian Navy: BAP Aguirre (FM-55) (ex-Orsa) and BAP Palacios (FM-56) (ex-Lupo). Finally in August 2006 the last Italian Lupo ships arrived in Callao: BAP Quiñones (FM-58) and BAP Bolognesi (FM-57). In 2013, Carvajal was transferred to the Peruvian Coast Guard and renamed Guardiamarina San Martin.

=== Ships ===
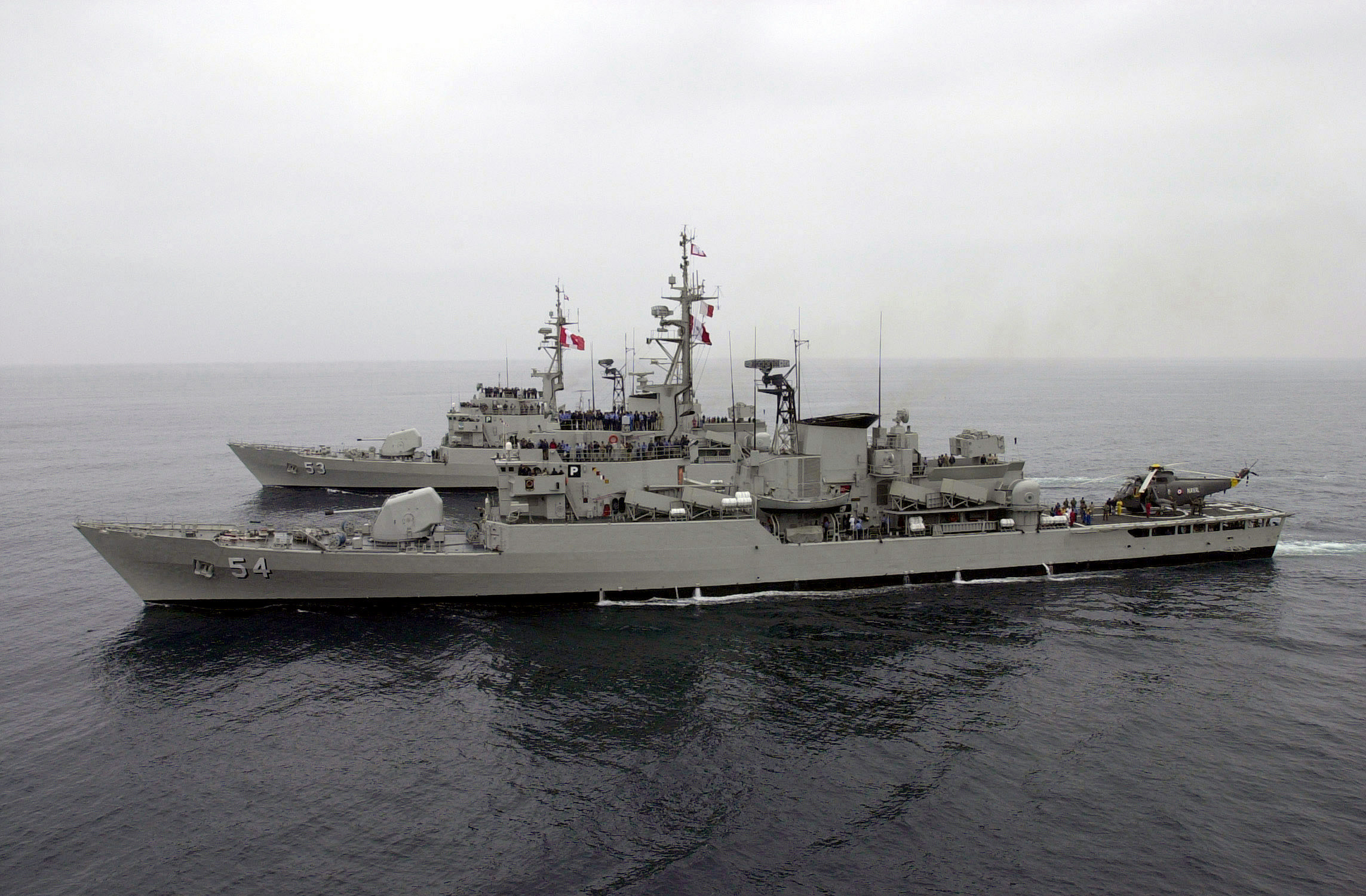
Peruvian Carvajal-class frigates, Montero and Mariátegui.

Carvajal class
Pennant number	Ship	Builder	Hull number	Laid down	Launched	Commissioned	Fate
FM-51	Carvajal	Cantieri Navali Riuniti, Riva Trigoso	304	8 August 1974	17 November 1976	5 February 1979	Transferred to Peruvian Coast Guard in 2013, renamed Guardiamarina San Martin
FM-52	Villavicencio	Cantieri Navali Riuniti, Riva Trigoso	305	6 October 1976	7 February 1978	25 June 1979	Active in service
FM-53	Montero (later Almirante Grau)	SIMA, Callao		October 1978	8 October 1982	25 July 1984	Active in service. Renamed 2017
FM-54	Mariátegui	SIMA, Callao		1979	8 October 1984	10 October 1987	Active in service
ex-Italian Lupo class
FM-55	Aguirre	Cantieri Navali Riuniti, Muggiano	303	1 August 1977	1 March 1979		ex-Orsa
FM-56	Palacios	Cantieri Navali Riuniti, Riva Trigoso	300	11 October 1974	29 July 1976		ex-Lupo
FM-57	Coronel Bolognesi	Cantieri Navali Riuniti, Riva Trigoso	302	28 February 1977	12 July 1978		ex-Perseo
FM-58	Quiñones	Cantieri Navali Riuniti, Riva Trigoso	301	4 February 1976	22 June 1977		ex-Sagittario

== Venezuelan Navy ==
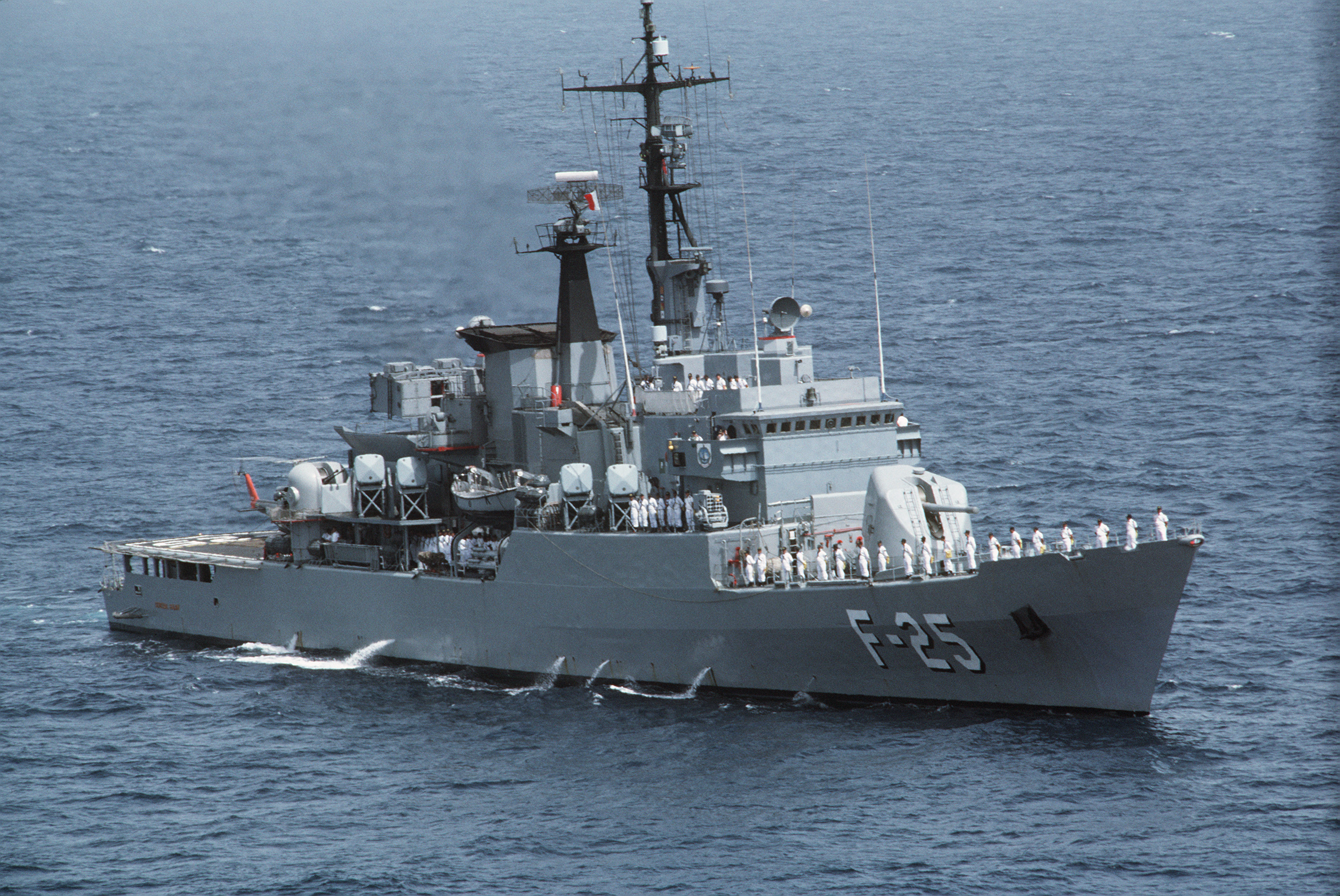
A starboard bow view of ARV General Salom prior to her upgrade

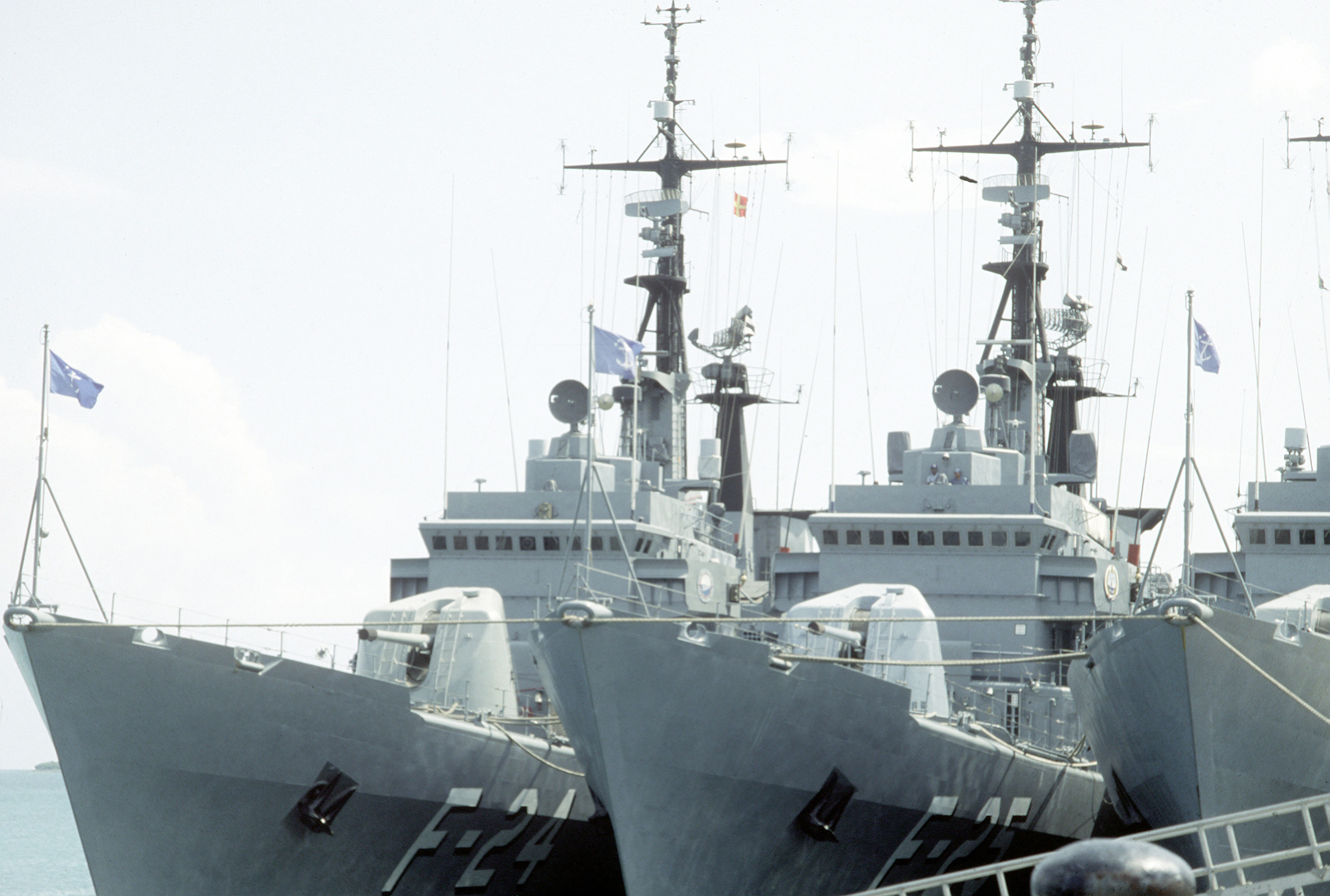
ARV General Soublette (F-24) and ARV General Salóm (F-25) docked alongside in port

Venezuela ordered six Lupo-class frigates from CNR in 1975 as a replacement for older warships. These units were commissioned between 1980 and 1982. In general terms, their appearance and equipment is similar to those built for Peru, except for some differences in electronics and missiles. The first two ships, ARV Mariscal Sucre (F-21) and ARV Almirante Brión (F-22) were upgraded by Ingalls Shipbuilding over a four years period (1998–2002). Modifications of these two ships included:

- Fitting of Elbit NTCS 2000 combat management system
- Fitting of Elta EL/M-2238 Single Face STAR 3D air/surface radar
- Fitting of Northrop Grumman 21 HS-7 hull sonar
- Fitting of Elisra NS-9003 ESM system
- Fitting of Elisra NS-9005 ECM system
- Replacement of 2 GMT A230-20M diesel engines with 2 MTU 20V 1163.

The other ships in Venezuelan service were expected to undergo an austere version of this upgrade, but three ships were eventually taken out of service. As of December 2022, however, the Mariscal Sucre has been observed to be partially sunk alongside the partially scrapped General Soublette.

=== Ships ===
Mariscal Sucre class
Pennant number	Ship	Builder	Hull number	Laid down	Launched	Commissioned	Fate
F-21	Mariscal Sucre	Cantieri Navali Riuniti, Riva Trigoso	851	19 November 1976	28 September 1978	10 May 1980	Out of service; partially sunk
F-22	Almirante Brión	Cantieri Navali Riuniti, Riva Trigoso	853	June 1977	22 February 1979	7 March 1981	In service
F-23	General Urdaneta	Cantieri Navali Riuniti, Riva Trigoso	852	23 January 1978	23 March 1979	8 August 1981	Out of service
F-24	General Soublette	Cantieri Navali Riuniti, Riva Trigoso	855	26 August 1978	4 January 1980	5 December 1981	Out of service; partially scrapped
F-25	General Salom	Cantieri Navali Riuniti, Riva Trigoso	854	7 November 1978	13 January 1980	3 April 1982	Scrapped 2023; reportedly sold for scrap
F-26	Almirante Garcia (ex-José Felix Ribas)	Cantieri Navali Riuniti, Riva Trigoso	856	21 August 1979	4 October 1980	30 July 1982	Scrapped 2021

== See also ==
- List of frigate classes by country

Equivalent frigates of the same era

- Wielingen class
- Koni class
- Type 21
- Type 053
- Almirante Padilla class
- Ulsan class

== Sources ==
- Faulkner, Keith, Jane's Warship Recognition Guide. 2nd edition. Jane's Information Group, 1999.
- (in Spanish) Rodríguez, John, "Las fragatas Lupo: una breve mirada retrospectiva y perspectivas". Revista de Marina, Year 95, No. 3: 8–32 (July / December 2002).
- Scheina, Robert L. & Smigielski, Adam (1995). "Peru". In Chumbley, Stephen (ed.). Conway's All the World's Fighting Ships, 1947–1995 (revised ed.). Naval Institute Press. pp. 303–307. ISBN 1-55750-132-7.
