= Otobreda 127/54 Compact =

Otobreda 127mm/54C
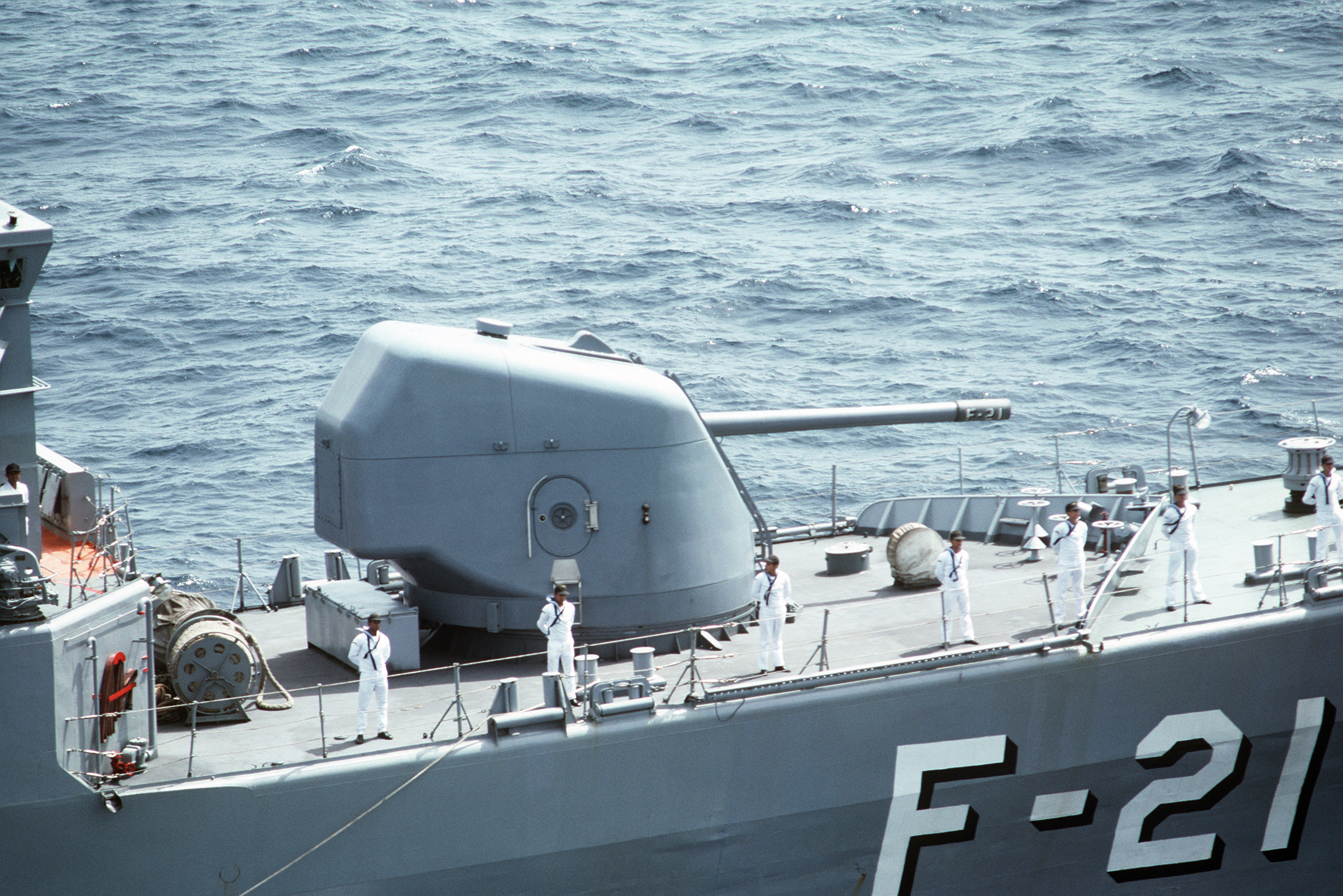
- Otobreda 127mm/54C on Venezuelan frigate Mariscal Sucre (F-21)
- Type: Naval gun
- Place of origin: Italy

Service history
- Used by: See users

Production history
- Designer: Oto Melara
- Variants: Otobreda 127/64

Specifications
- Barrel length: 270 in (6.9 m)
- Crew: remote controlled
- Shell: 127x835mmR shell weight: 29 to 31 kg (64 to 68 lb)
- Caliber: 127 mm (5.0 in)
- Elevation: −15°/+83°
- Traverse: 360° speed: 40°/s
- Rate of fire: 40 rounds/min
- Effective firing range: ±30 km (100 km with guided VULCANO ammunition)
- Feed system: Magazine capacity: 66 ready rounds

The Otobreda 127mm/54 Compact (127/54C) gun is a dual purpose naval artillery piece built by the Italian company Oto Melara. It uses the 127mm round which is also used in the 5 inch/ 54 gun, albeit that this gun calibre is measured in United States customary units rather than metric. The gun uses an automatic loading system where 66 127mm rounds of various kinds can be stored ready-to-fire in three loader drums (each holding 22 rounds). The barrel is water-cooled. Currently the gun is still in use by navies around the world but it is slowly being replaced by the Otobreda 127/64 for new vessels, such as the German Navy's F125-class frigate and Italian Navy's FREMM.

== Vulcano munition ==
On 3 April 2003 the Italian Ministry of Defence signed a memorandum of understanding with the Dutch Ministry of Defence to establish the need for long range munition and to develop this munition, which was named Vulcano, together for the Otobreda 127mm naval gun.

== OTO Melara 127/64 ==
A replacement of the 127/54 compact, Oto Melara started the design in 1992, and completed it in 2003. The new lightweight gun, weighing 17 tons without magazine or ammunition handling, has a rate of fire of 35 rpm, and can fire the long range guided Vulcano ammunition.

== Operators ==
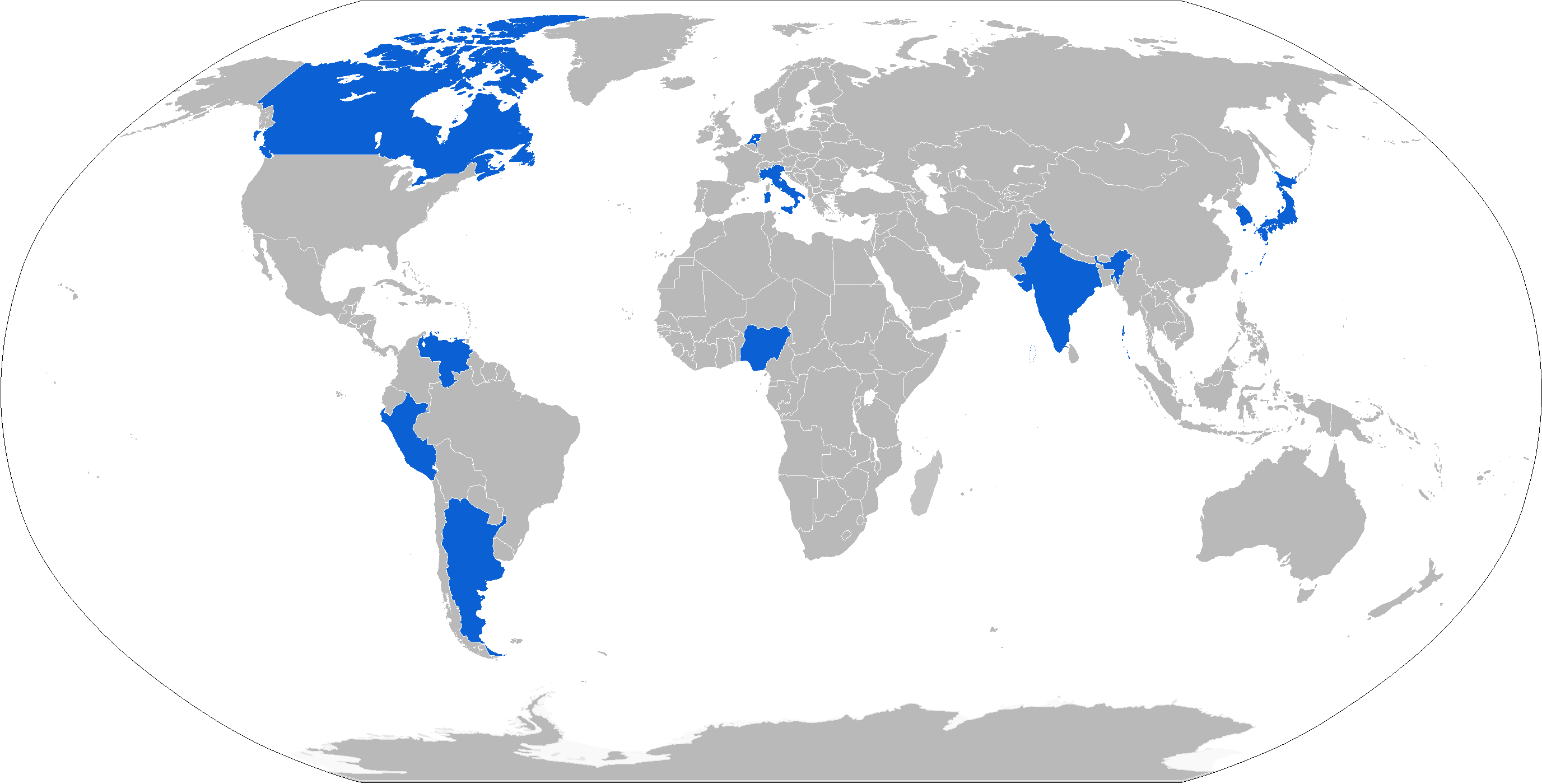
Operators of the Oto Melara 127 Naval Gun in blue

The Otobreda 127/54 Compact is used in the following countries and ship classes:

=== Current operators ===
Argentina

- Almirante Brown-class destroyer

Italy

- Durand de la Penne-class destroyer
- Maestrale-class frigate

Japan

- Kongō-class destroyer
- Takanami-class destroyer

Netherlands

- De Zeven Provinciën-class frigate

Nigeria

- MEKO 360 frigate (Aradu)

Peru

- Lupo-class frigate

South Korea

- Gwanggaeto the Great-class destroyer

Venezuela

- Lupo-class frigate

=== Former operators ===
Canada

- Iroquois-class destroyer (before TRUMP modifications, retired 2017)

Italy

- Audace-class destroyer (retired)
- Lupo-class frigate

== See also ==
=== Weapons of comparable role, performance and era ===
- 4.5 inch Mark 8 naval gun: contemporary standard naval gun for British ships
- 5"/54 caliber Mark 45 gun: contemporary standard naval gun for US ships
- AK-130: contemporary 130 mm twin standard naval gun mounting for Russian ships
- H/PJ-38 130mm naval gun : contemporary 130 mm standard naval gun mounting for Chinese ships
- French 100 mm naval gun: contemporary standard naval gun for French ships
