= BAP Chipana =

Submarine of the Peruvian Navy

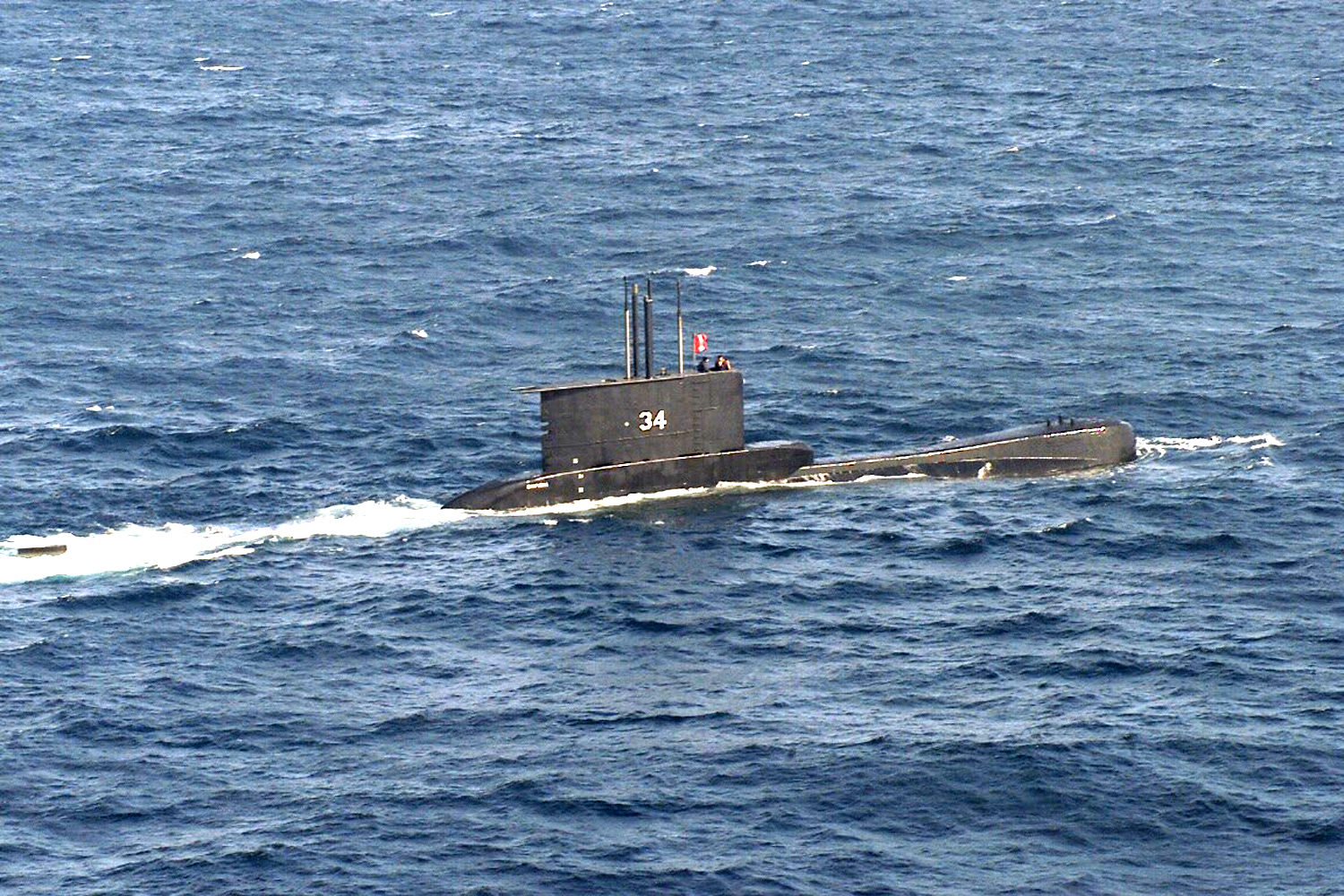
- BAP Chipana (SS-34)

History

Peru
- Name: Chipana
- Laid down: 1 November 1978
- Launched: 19 May 1981
- Commissioned: 28 October 1982
- Home port: Callao
- Motto: Temple y corazón

General characteristics
- Displacement: 1,180 t surfaced; 1,285 t submerged
- Length: 55.9 m
- Beam: 6.4 m
- Draft: 5.9 m
- Propulsion: 4 MTU Type 12V493 AZ80 GA31L diesel engines; 1 Siemens electric motor; 1 shaft; 4,600 hp (3,400 kW)
- Speed: 11 knots surfaced; 21 knots (39 km/h) submerged
- Range: 11,300 nm surfaced at 4 knots (7.4 km/h)
- Endurance: 40 days on patrol
- Complement: 5 officers, 26 enlisted
- Armament: 8 × 21 in (533 mm) torpedo tubes; 14 SST-4 torpedoes

BAP Chipana (SS-34) is one of two Type 209/1200 submarines ordered by the Peruvian Navy on March 21, 1977. She was built by the German shipbuilder Howaldtswerke Deutsche Werft AG at its shipyard in Kiel.

== History ==
=== Origin ===
She was originally named Blume after the 19th-century engineer Federico Blume, however on April 21, 1980, she was renamed after the battle of Chipana which took place between naval forces of Peru and Chile on April 12, 1879. Following sea trials in the North Sea, she arrived at her home port of Callao in 1983.

=== Modernization ===
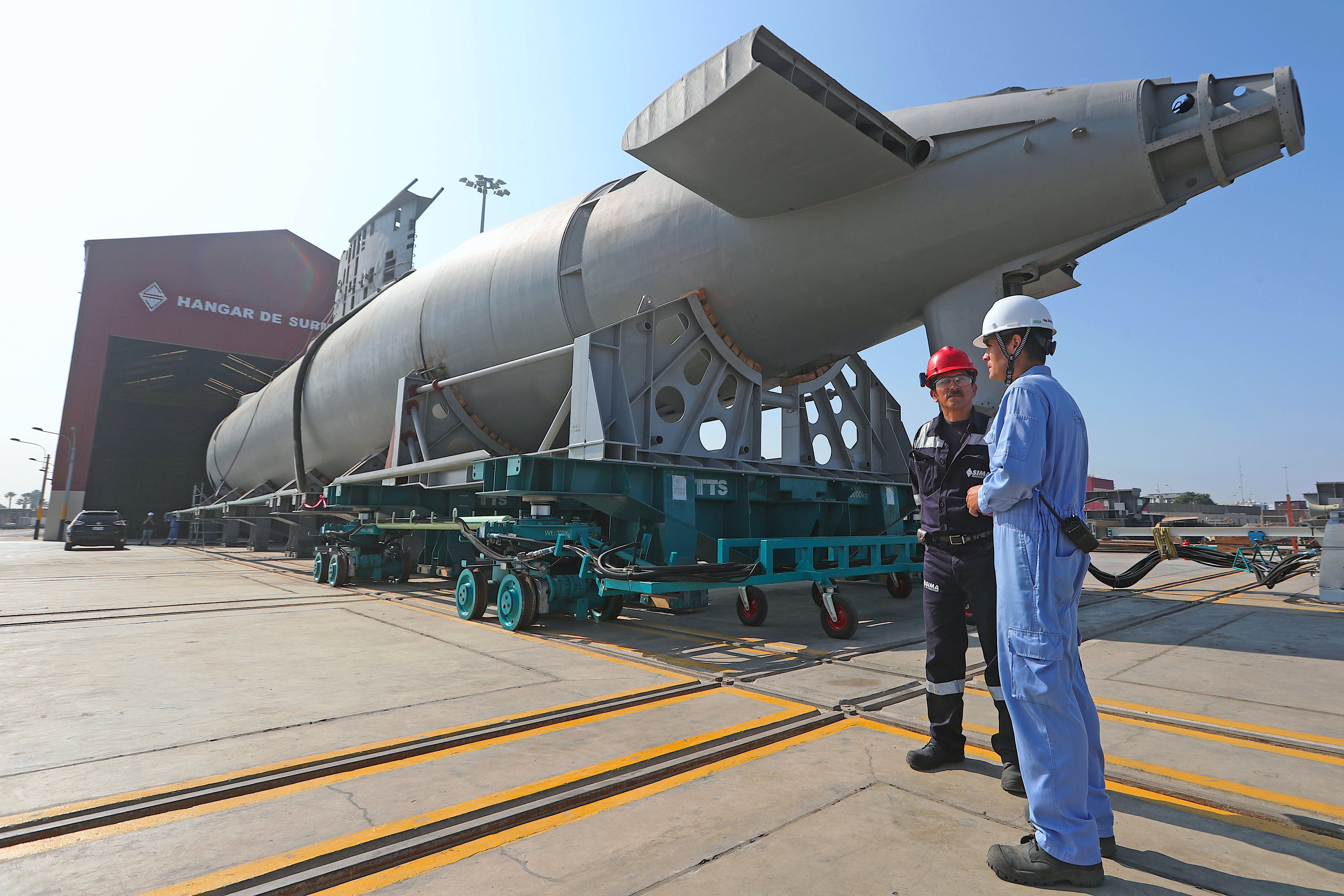
BAP Chipana (SS-34) undergoing upgrades

In 2018, the BAP Chipana began the process of being modernized by SIMA. The submarine was split in order to replace its mechanical and control equipment. Electrical, navigation and propulsion systems were also upgraded. The German marine company ThyssenKrupp Marine Systems assisted Peru with the program, being awarded €40 million to help upgrade Peru's submarines.

The other three submarines of the same class – BAP Angamos, BAP Antofagasta and BAP Pisagua – were also destined to be upgraded following the completion of work performed on the BAP Chipana.
