= Edmundo Deville del Campo =

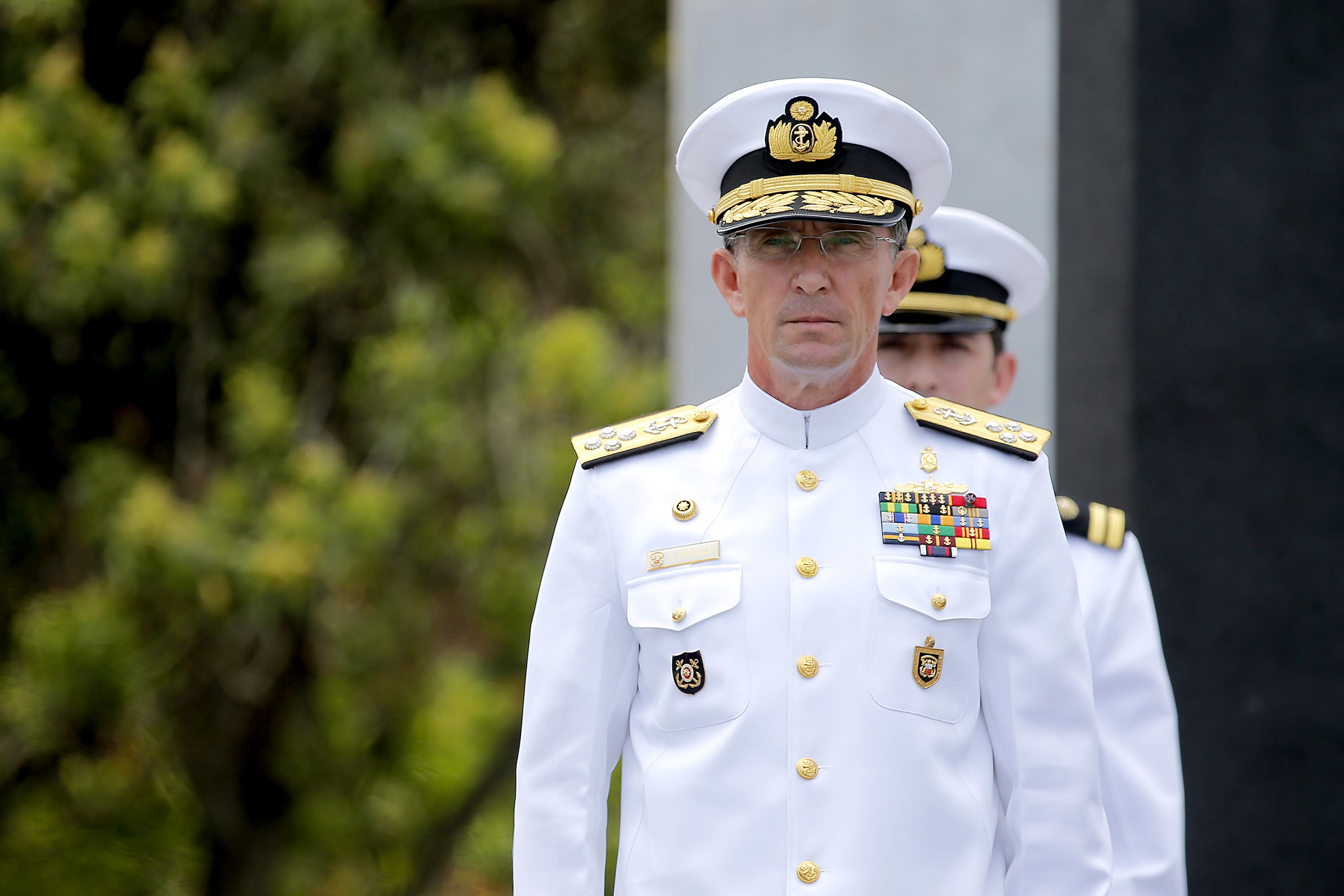
- Born: May 17, 1959 (age 67)
- Military career
- Allegiance: Peru
- Branch: Peruvian Navy
- Rank: Admiral
- Commands: General Commander of the Peruvian Navy

Admiral Edmundo Deville del Campo (born 17 May 1959) is a Peruvian naval officer, who served as Commander General of the Peruvian Navy from 1 January 2015 to 30 December 2016.

He was appointed Commander of the Surface Force with the rank of Rear Admiral in January 2009 before assuming command of the Directorate of Personnel Administration in 2010. In 2011 he was appointed the General Directorate of Navy Personnel. On January 1, 2012 he was promoted to Vice Admiral, and appointed commander of the Directorate of Captaincies and Coast Guards in July 2012.

After his retirement he was appointed as Peru's alternate representative to the International Maritime Organization and in 2018 was elected vice president of the council.

Military offices
Preceded by	Chief of the Peruvian Navy; 2014 – 2016	Succeeded by Nicolas Rios Polastri
