= Gerónimo Cafferata Marazzi =

Peruvian Naval officer

Geronimo Cafferata Marazzi (14 July 1929 - 26 October 1986) was a Peruvian Navy officer and government minister. He served briefly as housing minister during Juan Velasco Alvarado's military regime and then for a year as General Commander of the Peruvian Navy during Alan García's presidency. After 39 years in the navy, he retired in 1986 to take on the presidency of the board of the state Banco Industrial del Perú.

In October 1986, Cafferata's car was attacked in Lima by Shining Path insurgents. He was shot several times and died in Baltimore (where he had gone for treatment) 12 days later. A chauffeur and a bodyguard were also slightly wounded in the attack. At the time, UPI described Cafferata as the highest-ranking military officer yet to be attacked by Shining Path. The UPI article stated that "Shining Path rebels have tried to kill navy officials in recent months in an apparent vengeance campaign for alleged navy atrocities in fighting the rebel group."
