= PR-72P-class corvette =

1980 class of Peruvian Navy corvettes

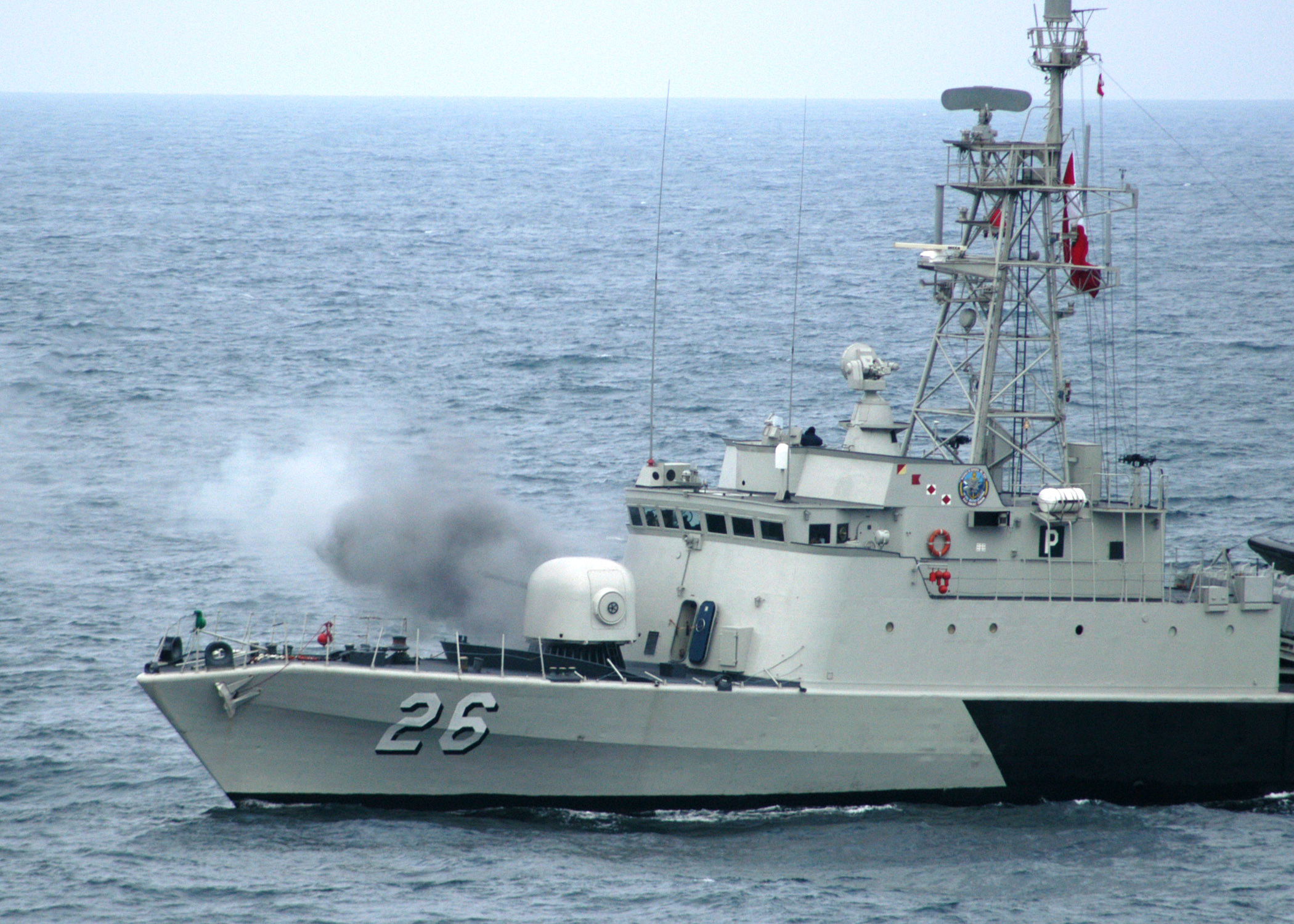
- BAP Sánchez Carrión (CM-26)

Class overview
- Builders: Villeneuve-la-Garenne (SFCN); Lorient Naval Dockyard
- Operators: Peruvian Navy
- In commission: July 25, 1980
- Planned: 6
- Completed: 6
- Active: 6

General characteristics
- Type: Corvette
- Displacement: 560 tons standard (610 tons full load)
- Length: 64 m (210 ft)
- Beam: 8.35 m (27.4 ft)
- Draft: 2.6 m (8.5 ft)
- Propulsion: 4 SACM AGO 240V16 M7 diesel engines; 4 shafts, 17,424 shp (12.993 MW) (CM-21,CM-23,CM-25); 4 MTU 12V595 diesel engines; 4 shafts, 22,000 shp (16 MW); (CM-22,CM-24,CM-26)
- Speed: 30 knots (56 km/h); (CM-21,CM-23,CM-25); 32 knots (59 km/h); (CM-22,CM-24,CM-26)
- Range: 2,500 nmi (4,600 km) at 16 kn (30 km/h)
- Complement: 36 (accommodation for 46)
- Sensors & processing systems: Thomson-CSF THD 1040 Triton air/surface search radar; Decca BridgeMaster E navigation radar; Thomson-CSF Vega II fire-control system; Thomson-CSF Castor II fire-control radar; CSEE Panda optical director
- Electronic warfare & decoys: Thomson-CSF DR-2000 ESM system
- Armament: 4 Exocet MM-38 SSMs; 1 OTO Melara 76/62mm Compact gun; 1 OTO Melara Twin 40L70 DARDO compact gun; 1 MGP-86 mount for Igla SAM
- Notes: classified as guided missile corvette

The PR-72P class are a series of French-designed corvettes in service with the Peruvian Navy. Six units were ordered in 1976 by the Peruvian Navy from the Société Française de Construction Navale (SFCN). Subsequently, three of them were built by the company's own Villeneuve-la-Garenne shipyard, and the rest subcontracted to Lorient Naval Dockyard. Pennant numbers were originally P-101 to P-106, but were later modified to CM-21 to CM-26, where CM stands for corbeta misilera, Spanish for guided missile corvette.

== Ships ==
Pennant number	Name	Builder	Launched	Commissioned
CM-21	Velarde	Villeneuve-la-Garenne (SFCN)	16 September 1978	25 July 1980
CM-22	Santillana	Villeneuve-la-Garenne (SFCN)	11 September 1978	25 July 1980
CM-23	De los Heros	Villeneuve-la-Garenne (SFCN)	20 May 1979	17 November 1980
CM-24	Herrera	Lorient Naval Dockyard	16 February 1979	10 February 1981
CM-25	Larrea	Lorient Naval Dockyard	12 May 1979	16 June 1981
CM-26	Sánchez Carrión	Lorient Naval Dockyard	28 June 1979	14 September 1981

In 1998 the Peruvian Navy signed a contract with MTU to re-engine three PR-72P-class corvettes. The other units are expected to be similarly modified in the near future.

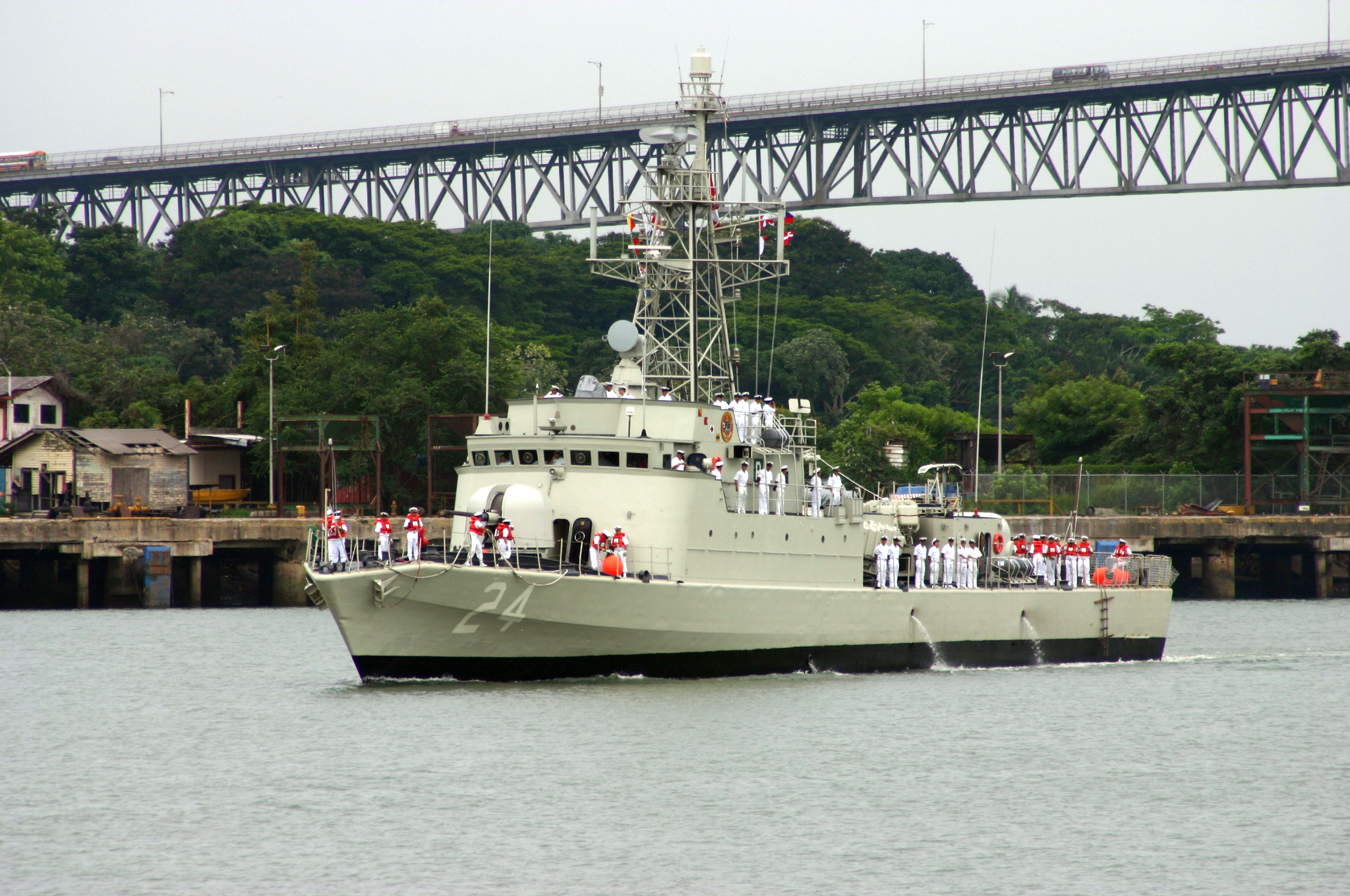
BAP Herrera (CM-24) during PANAMAX 2006

== Sources ==
- Baker III, Arthur D., The Naval Institute Guide to Combat Fleets of the World 2002-2003. Naval Institute Press, 2002.
- Scheina, Robert L. & Smigelski, Adam (1995). "Peru". In Chumbley, Stephen (ed.). Conway's All the World's Fighting Ships, 1947–1995 (revised ed.). Naval Institute Press. pp. 303–307. ISBN 1-55750-132-7.
- Sharpe, Richard (ed.), Jane's Fighting Ships 1990 - 91. Jane's Information Group, 1990.
