= Peruvian Navy =

Naval branch of the Peruvian Armed Forces

- Marina de Guerra del Perú
- Coat of arms of the Peruvian Navy
- Founded: 8 October 1821
- Branch: Navy
- Size: 25,988 active personnel 116 ships, 43 aircraft
- Naval headquarters: Callao naval base, Peru
- Patron: Miguel Grau Seminario
- Anniversaries: October 8 (Note: The date honours both the official establishment of the Navy in 1821 and the 1879 Battle of Angamos.)
- Fleet: 5 Submarines; 7 Frigates; 8 Corvettes; 34 patrol ships 2 Landing Platform, Dock; 1 landing ships, tank 6 River gunboats 4 Training Ships; 25 Auxiliaries
- Engagements: See list: Peruvian War of Independence; Territorial disputes of Peru; Conflict with Bolivia; War of 1841–1842; Andrés de Santa Cruz raid on Peru; Angulo Raid; Hercelles Raid; Conflict with Colombia; War of 1828–1829; Conflict of 1911; Conflict with Ecuador; War of 1857–1860; War of 1941; Conflict with Spain; BAP Gamarra Expedition; Peruvian Civil Wars; War of 1835–1836; War of 1836–1839; War of 1856–1858; War of 1980–2000; War of the Pacific

Commanders
- General Commander of the Navy: Luis Polar Figari

Insignia
- Flag

- Naval ensign

- Naval jack

- Standard

- Roundel

- Low-visibility roundel

The Peruvian Navy (Spanish: Marina de Guerra del Perú, abbreviated MGP) (Note: Alternatively the Armada Peruana (abbreviated AP)) is the branch of the Peruvian Armed Forces tasked with surveillance, patrol and defense on lakes, rivers and the Pacific Ocean up to 200 nautical miles (370 km; 230 mi) from the Peruvian littoral. Additional missions include assistance in safeguarding internal security, conducting disaster relief operations and participating in international peacekeeping operations.

The Marina de Guerra del Perú celebrates the anniversary of its creation in 1821 on October 8 and also commemorates the decisive Battle of Angamos, the final part of the naval campaign of the War of the Pacific between Peru and Chile at the end of 1879.

== History ==
=== 19th century ===
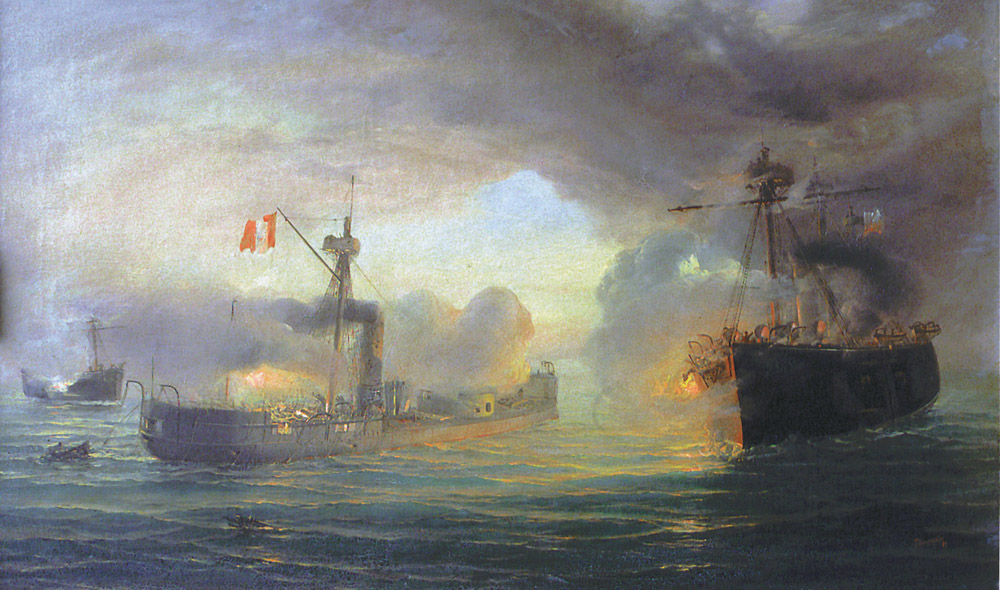
Battle of Angamos, 8 October 1879

The Marina de Guerra del Perú was established on 8 October 1821 by the government of general José de San Martín. Its first actions were undertaken during the War of Independence (1821–1824) using captured Spanish warships. The Peruvian Naval Infantry was also formed during the war with Spain, performing successfully in their first battle where they seized Arica from the Spanish.

Shortly afterwards it was engaged in the war against the Gran Colombia (1828–1829) during which it conducted a blockade against the seaport of Guayaquil and then assisted in the subsequent Peruvian occupation. The Navy saw further action during the war of the Peru-Bolivian Confederacy (1836–1839) and during the Chincha Islands War with Spain (1866).

The outbreak of the War of the Pacific (1879–1883) caught the Peruvian Navy unprepared and with inferior forces in comparison to the Chilean Navy. Even so, hit-and-run tactics carried out by Peruvian Admiral Miguel Grau, commander of the ironclad Huáscar, famously delayed the Chilean advance by six months until his death and defeat at the Battle of Angamos.

=== 20th century ===
Following the War of the Pacific, the Peruvian Navy had to be completely rebuilt. In 1900 the force consisted of only one cruiser of 1,700 tons displacement, a screw-driven steamer, and ten smaller ships – the latter described by a contemporary British publication as "of no real value". The lengthy process of expansion and rebuilding started in 1907 with the acquisition from the United Kingdom of the scout cruisers Almirante Grau and Coronel Bolognesi, followed by the arrival of two submarines, Ferré and Palacios, from France in 1911. During the Presidency of Augusto B. Leguía (1919–1930) a Navy Ministry was established as well as a Navy Aviation Corps, both in 1920.

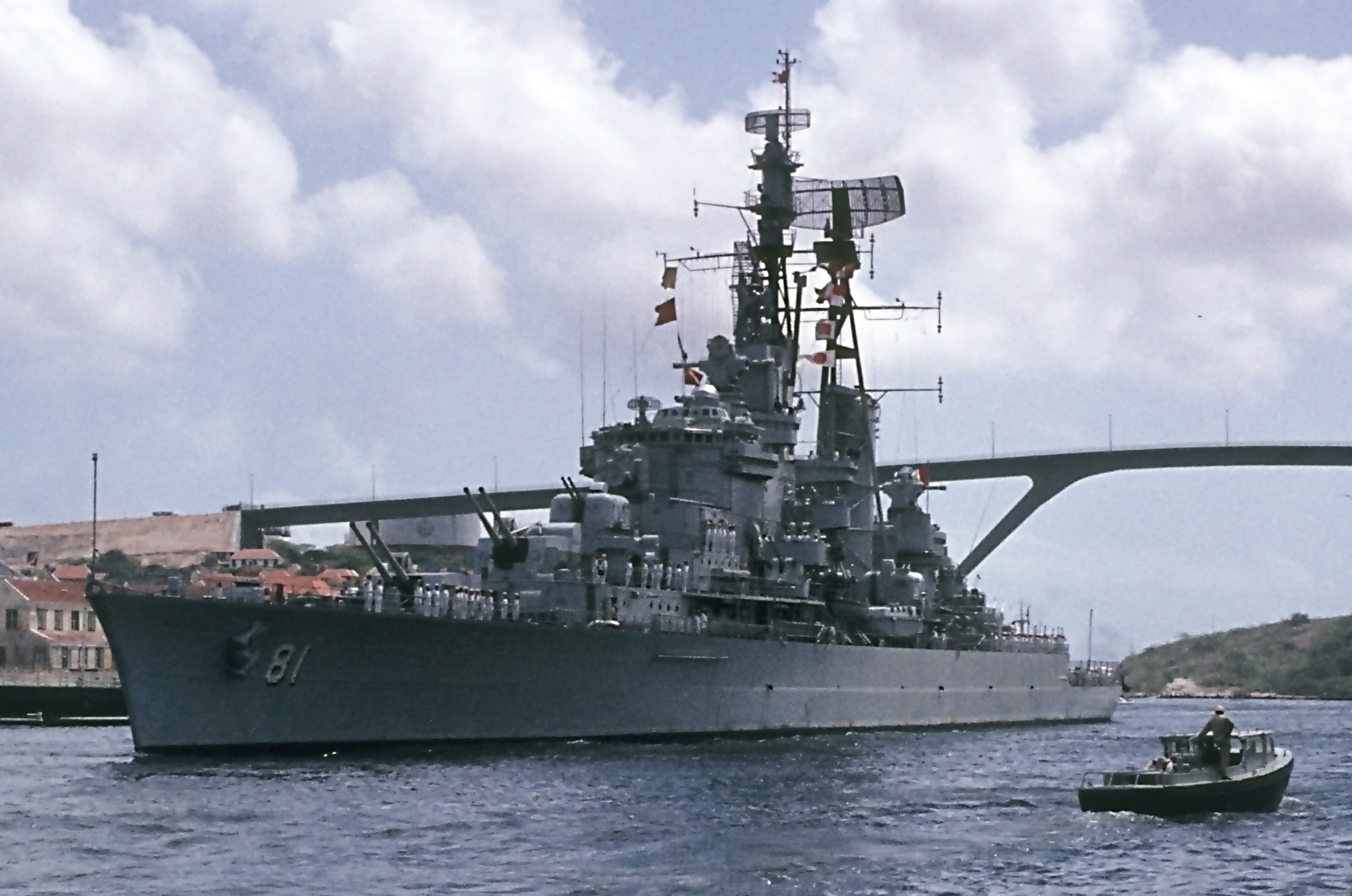
BAP Almirante Grau (CLM-81) in June 1973

Border conflicts with Colombia in 1911 and 1932 and a war with Ecuador in 1941 saw Peruvian warships involved in some skirmishes in support of the Army. The attack on Pearl Harbor brought World War II to the Pacific and even though Peru did not declare war on the Axis until 1945, its Navy was involved in patrol missions against possible threats by the Imperial Japanese Navy from early 1942 up to mid-1945.

During the 1970s and the first half of the 1980s the Peruvian Navy carried out a major buildup programme which allowed it to take advantage over its traditional rival, the Chilean Navy. The navy purchased one cruiser the BAP Almirante Grau (CLM-81) from the Netherlands, eight Carvajal-class frigates from Italy – four newly purchased and four ex-Lupo-class frigates – as well as six PR-72P-class corvettes from France. The buildup proved to be temporary due to the economic crisis of the second half of the 1980s, forcing the decommissioning of several warships and resulting in a general lack of funds for maintenance.

The economic upturn of the 1990s and into the 2000s would later permit some improvement, although at a reduced force level compared to the early 1980s.

=== 21st century ===
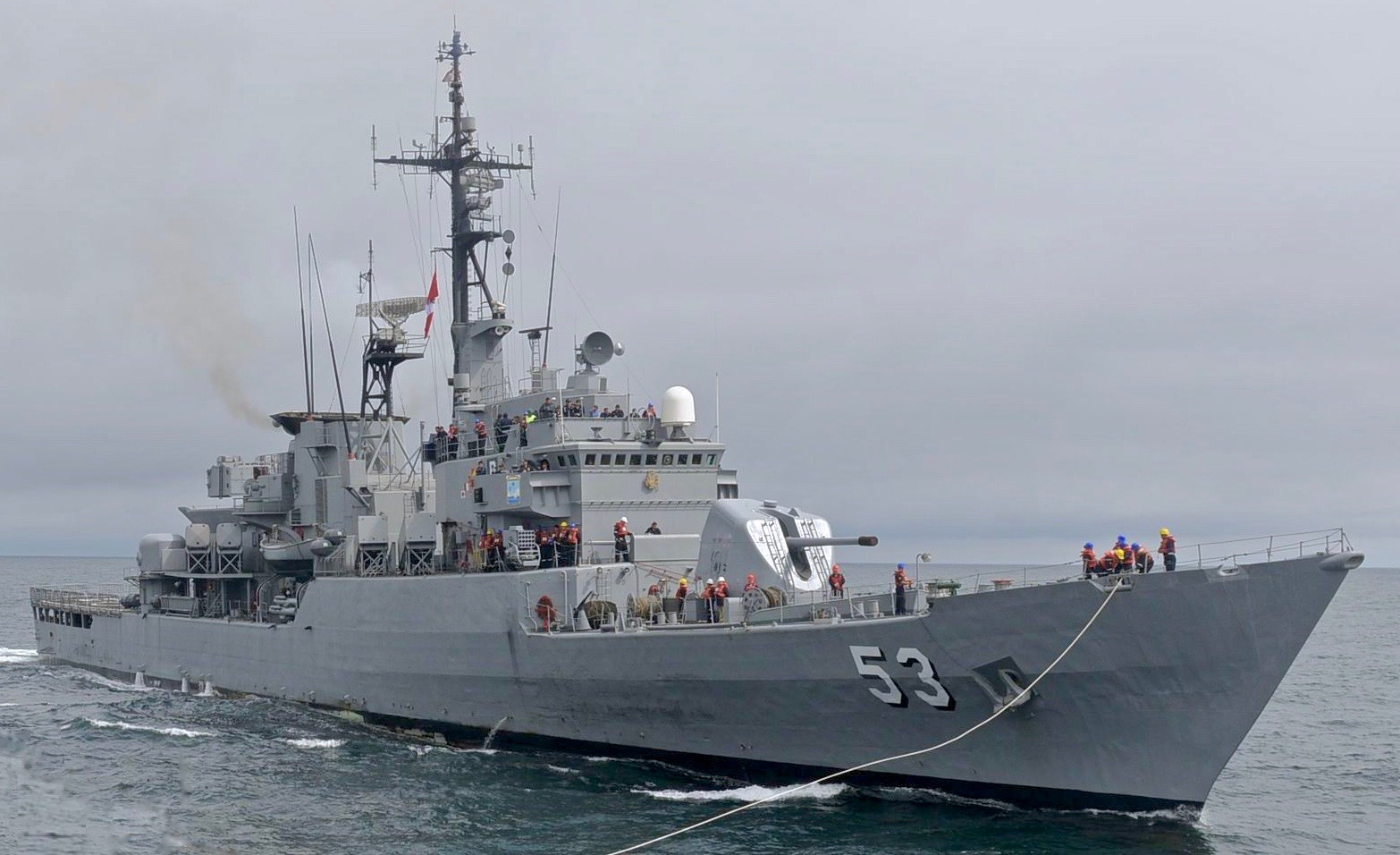
BAP Almirante Grau (FM-53), current fleet flagship

Into the 21st century, the Peruvian Navy began to modernize their ships. In 2008, the Type 209/1100 submarines were modernized while the Carvajal-class frigates began to be modernized in 2011. The Type 209/1200 submarines began to be modernized in late-2017 beginning with the BAP Chipana (SS-34).

SIMA has continued to construct ships for the Navy. In 2013, SIMA partnered with Posco Daewoo Corporation and Daesun Shipbuilding of South Korea to construct two Makassar-class landing platform docks. The BAP Pisco (AMP-156), recently launched on 25 April 2017, as well as the BAP Paita which is currently under construction will provide Peru with increased expeditionary warfare capabilities, with the ability to accommodate multiple Landing Craft Vehicle Personnel, newly purchased LAV IIs and helicopters.

In 2018, a modernization program was initiated to upgrade Peru's Type 209/1200 submarines, the BAP Chipana, BAP Angamos, BAP Antofagasta and BAP Pisagua, with a contract with ThyssenKrupp Marine Systems being made for further assistance with SIMA.

During the 2017–present Peruvian political crisis, the Navy of Peru was involved in political scandals. During the first impeachment process against president Martín Vizcarra, the next in the order of succession to the presidency, President of the Congress Manuel Merino, had been in contact with the Commanding General of the Navy saying that he was attempting to remove Vizcarra from office. While the 2021 Peruvian general election was underway, the imprisoned former head of the National Intelligence Service (SIN) Vladimiro Montesinos was able to make phone calls from a landline telephone at the Centro de Reclusión de Máxima Seguridad (CEREC) at the Callao Naval Base to organize projects and campaign support for Keiko Fujimori in the Vladi-audios scandal.

== Organization ==
The current Commander-in-Chief of the Peruvian Navy is Admiral Federico Javier Bravo de Rueda Delgado. Naval Forces are subordinated to the Ministry of Defense and ultimately to the President as Chief Supreme of the Peruvian Armed Forces. They are organized as follows:

- Comandancia General de la Marina (Navy General Command)
  - Estado Mayor General de la Marina (Navy General Staff)
  - Inspectoría General de la Marina (Navy General Inspectorate)

Operational units are divided between three commands:

Comandancia General de Operaciones del Pacífico

Pacific Operations General Command, it comprises the following units:

- Fuerza de Superficie (Surface Force)
- Fuerza de Submarinos (Submarine Force)
- Fuerza de Aviación Naval (Naval Aviation Force)
- Fuerza de Infantería de Marina (Naval Infantry Force)
- Fuerza de Operaciones Especiales (Special Operations Force)

Comandancia General de Operaciones de la Amazonía

Amazon Operations General Command, tasked with river patrolling in the Peruvian portion of the Amazon Basin.

Dirección General de Capitanías y Guardacostas

Directive General of Captains and Coast Guard, oversees Coast Guard operations

=== Coast Guard ===
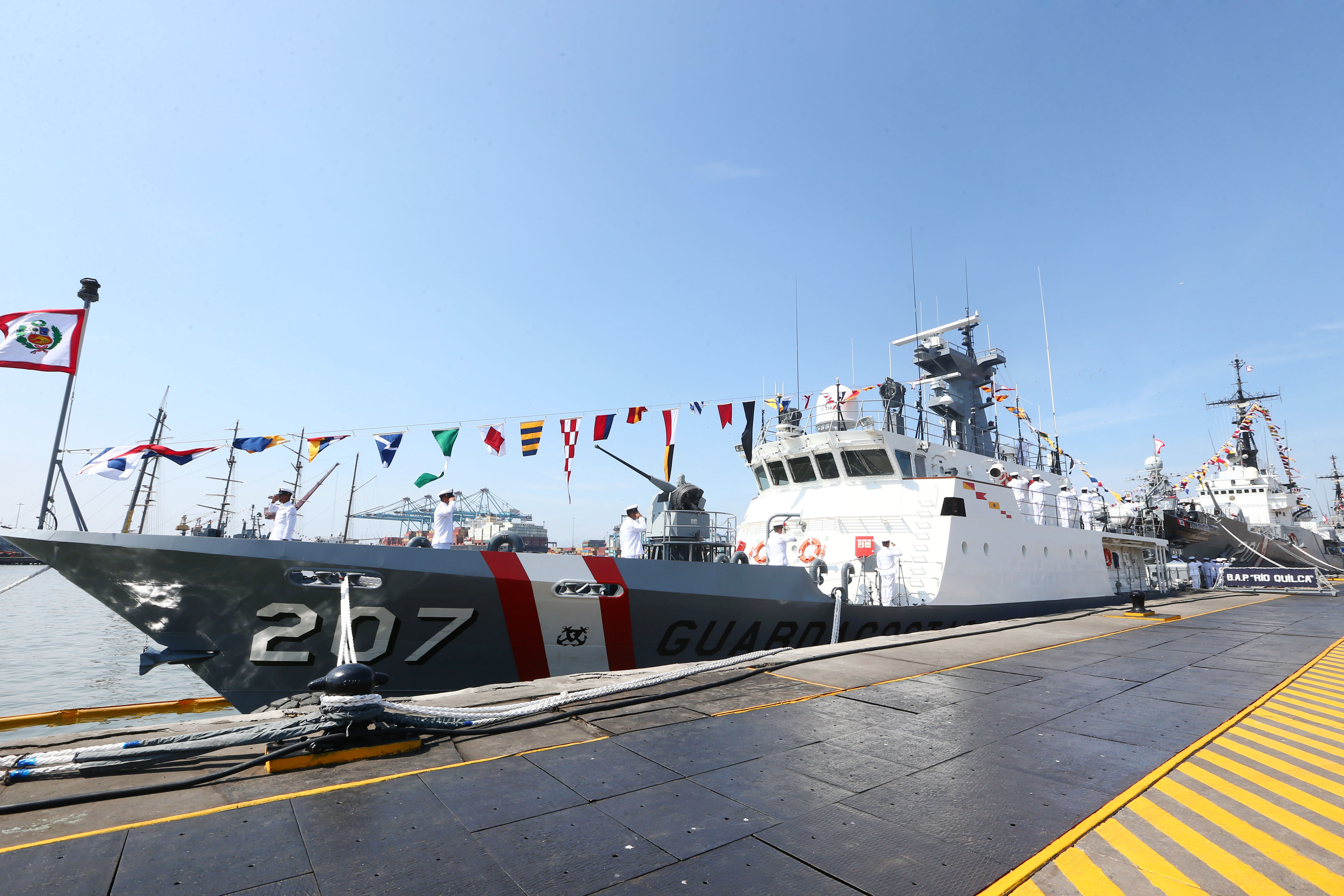
BAP Río Quilca (PM-207) of the Peruvian Coast Guard

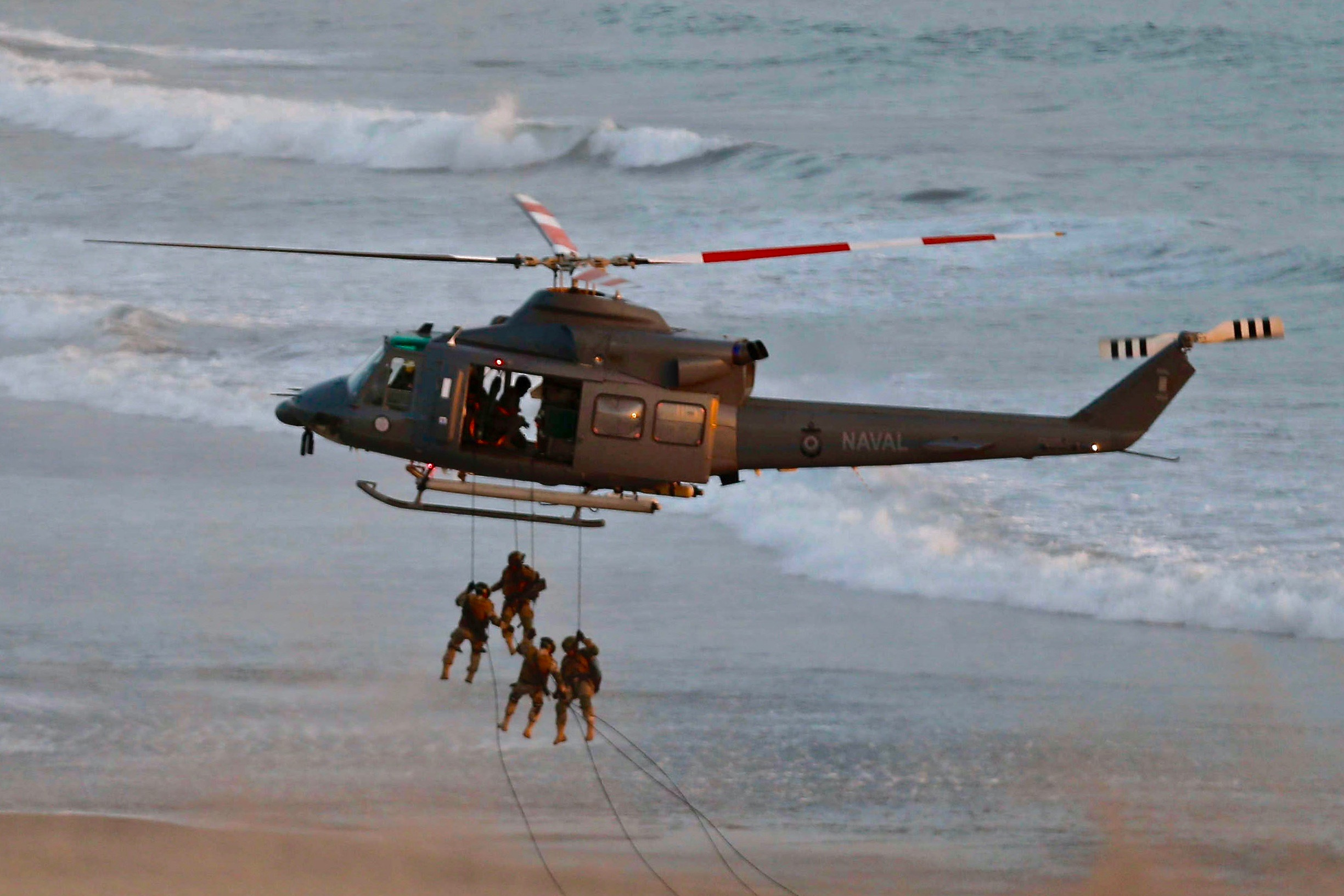
AVINAV Bell AB-212 with fast-roping Marines

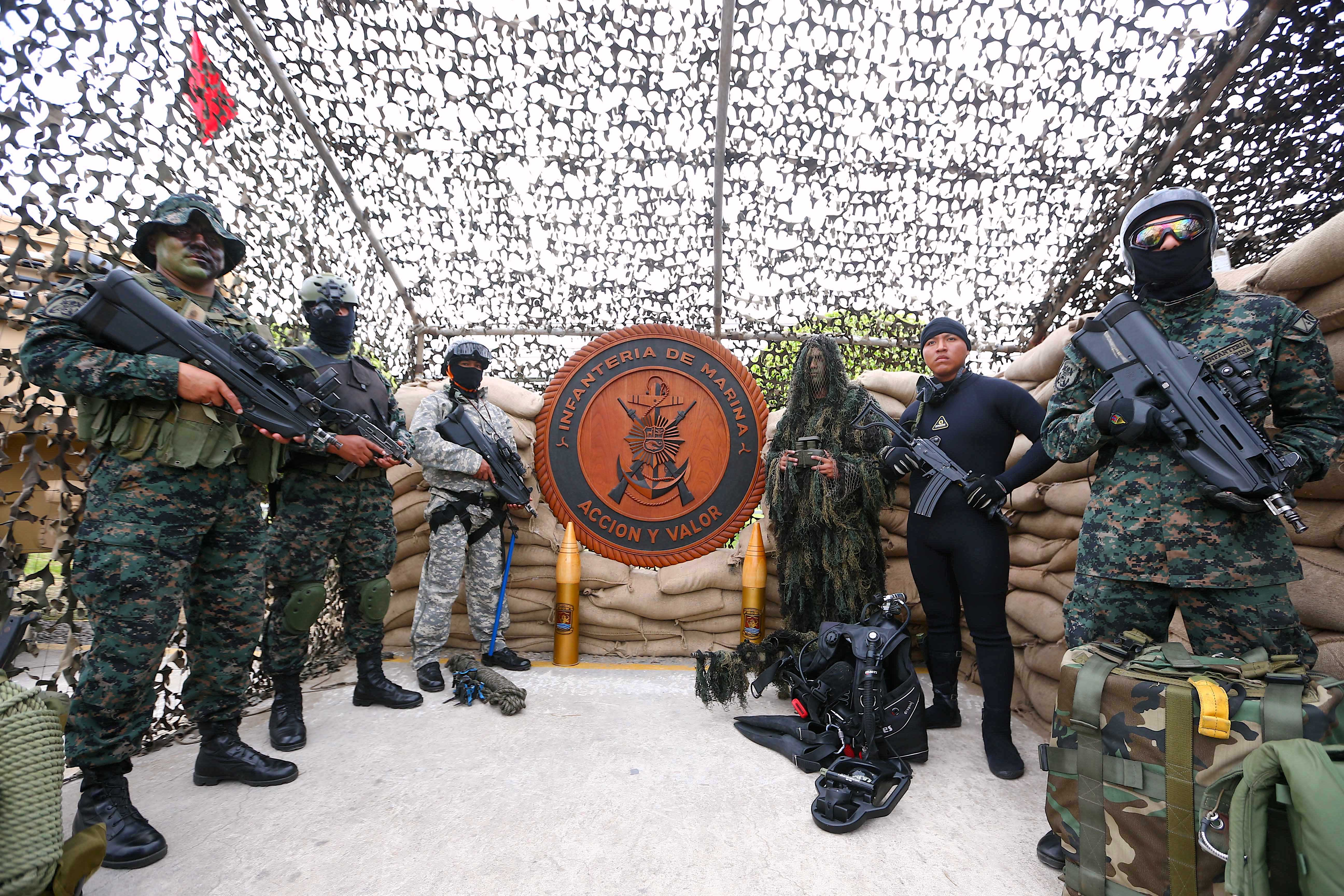
Peruvian Marines of various specialties

Coast Guard, tasked with law enforcement on Peruvian territorial waters, rivers and lakes. The Peruvian Coast Guard often performs anti-drug trafficking operations within the nation's waters. The Coast Guard has approximately 1,000 personnel.

=== Naval Aviation ===
The Naval Aviation Force (in Spanish): (Fuerza de Aviación Naval, AVINAV) is the air branch of the Peruvian Navy, its roles include anti-submarine warfare, anti-surface warfare, maritime surveillance, reconnaissance and transport of marine personnel. It is also responsible for airborne operations of the Peruvian Marines. Naval Aviation has about 800 personnel.

=== Naval Infantry ===
Naval Infantry Brigade

- 1st Naval Infantry Battalion – Ancón
- 2nd Naval Infantry Battalion – Ancón
- Amphibious Support Group
- Fire support Group
- Commando Grouping
- Engineers Unit

Other units

- 3rd Naval Infantry Battalion – Tumbes
- 4th Naval Infantry Battalion – Puno
- 1st Jungle Naval Infantry Battalion – Iquitos
- 2nd Jungle Naval Infantry Battalion – Pucallpa
- Naval Infantry Detachment Litoral Sur – Mollendo

== Bases ==
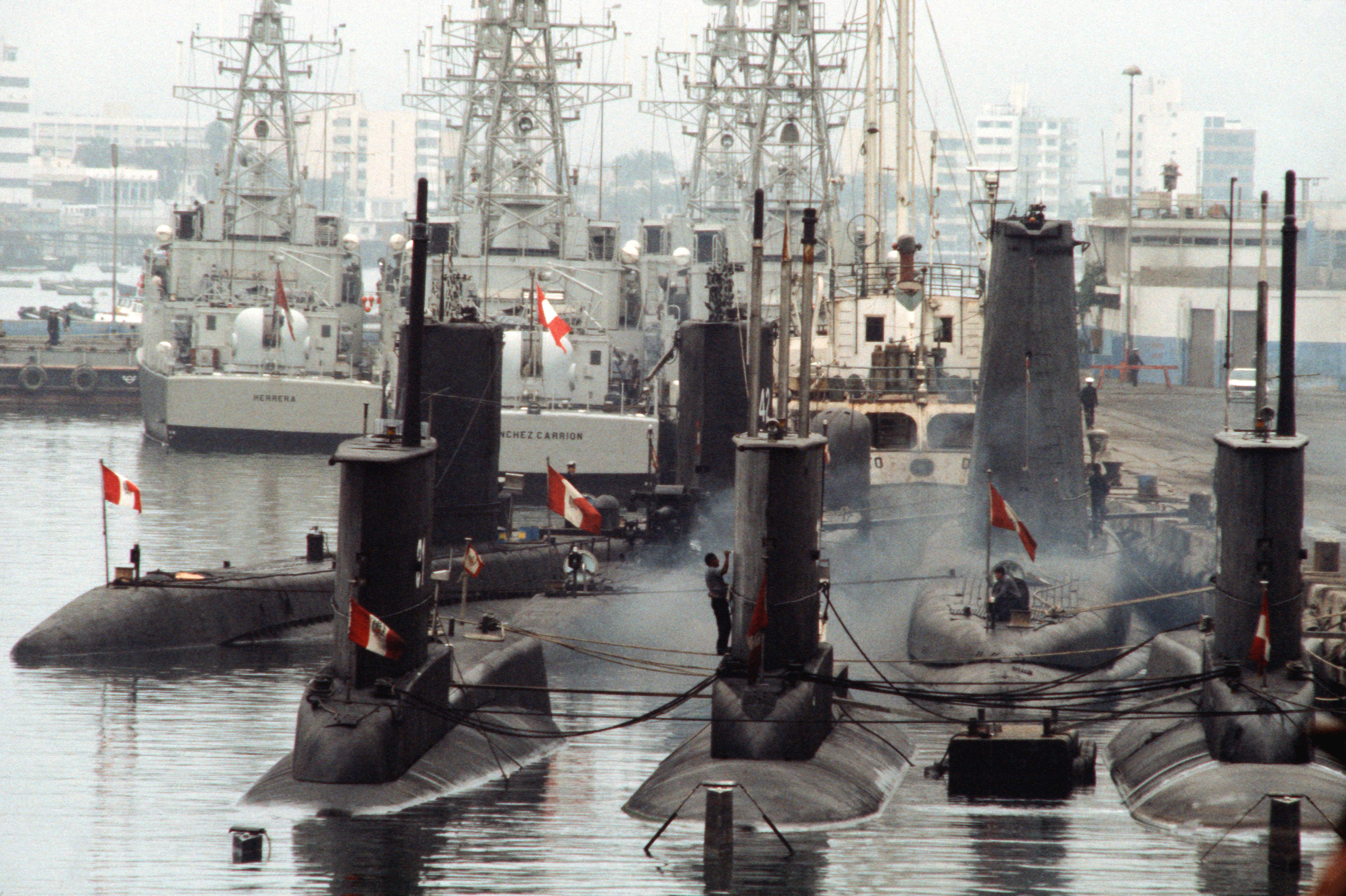
Callao naval base.

- Ancón – Naval Infantry headquarters and base
- Callao – Main naval base, dockyard and naval aviation base, Naval Medical Center which contains the US Navy unit Naval Medical Research Unit Six
- Chimbote – Minor base and dockyard
- Iquitos – On the Amazon river
- Paita – Minor base
- Pisco – Minor base
- Puno – On Lake Titicaca
- San Juan de Marcona – Naval aviation base

Although most of the fleet is based at Callao, this has not been considered an ideal location since it is also the main outlet for Peruvian trade, causing space and security problems. In the 1980s the building of a new naval base at Chimbote was considered though high costs and a poor economic situation made the project unfeasible.

== Personnel ==
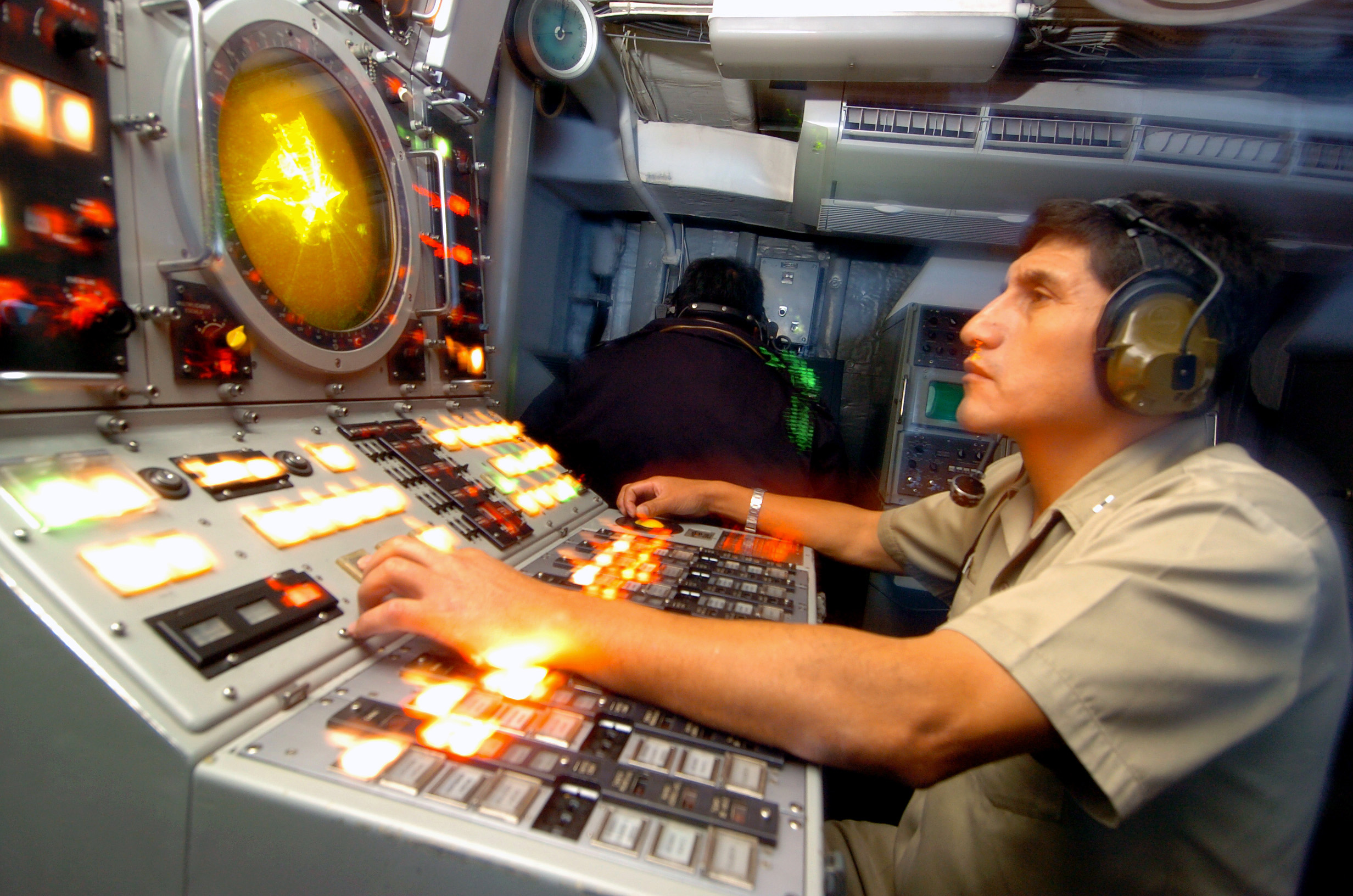
Standing watch on BAP Mariátegui (FM-54).

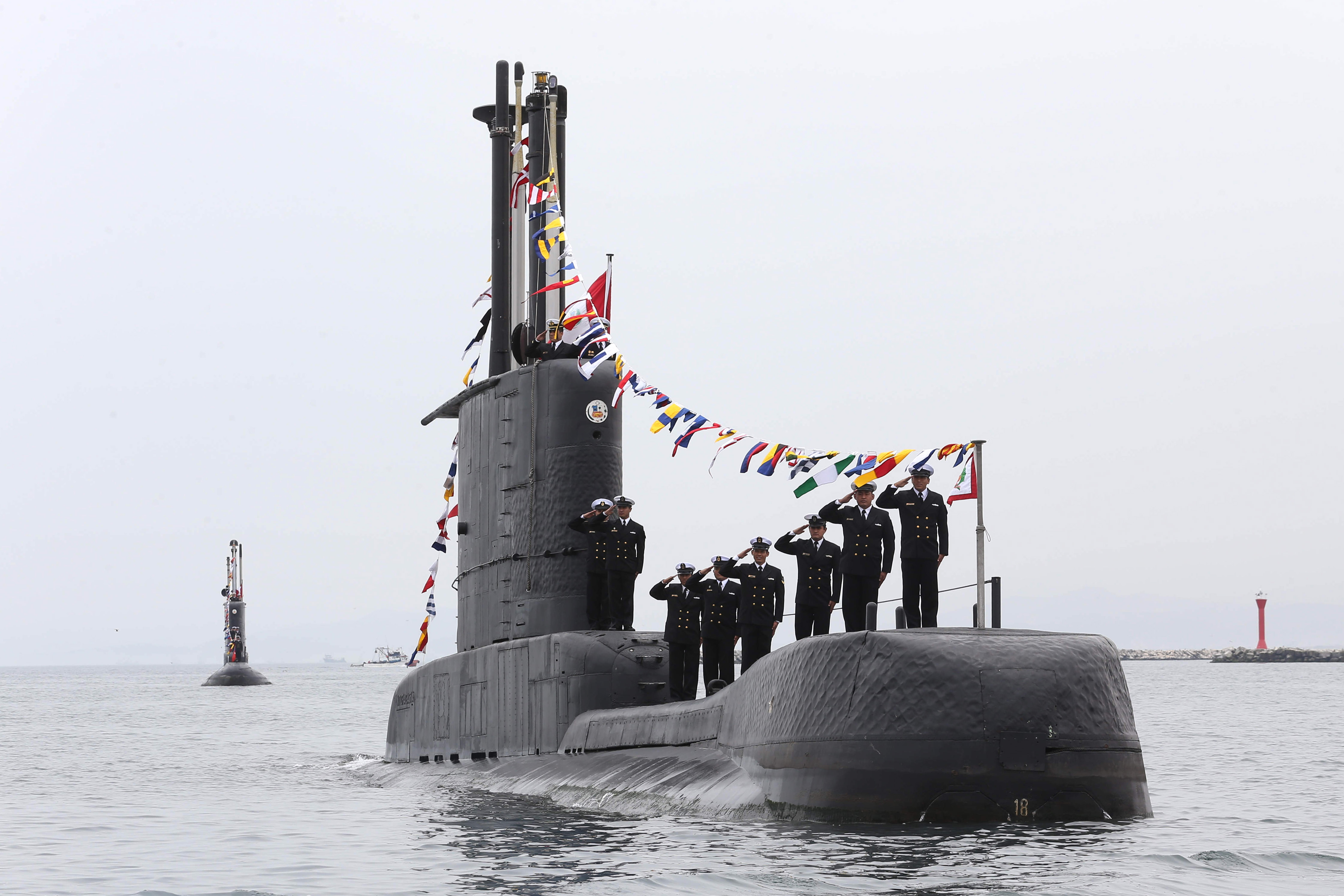
Submarine crew saluting while at sea.

Personnel (as of 2001)
Commissioned Officers	2,107
Non-commissioned officers	16,863
Cadets	620
NCO in training	1,533
Enlisted	4,855
Civilians	5,079
Total	25,988 (excl. civilians)

=== Ranks ===
==== Commissioned officer ranks ====
The rank insignia of commissioned officers.

Rank group	General / flag officers				Senior officers			Junior officers
Peruvian Navy
Peruvian Navy	Gran Almirante del Perú	Almirante	Vicealmirante	Contraalmirante	Capitán de navío	Capitán de fragata	Capitán de corbeta	Teniente primero	Teniente segundo	Alférez de fragata

==== Other ranks ====
The rank insignia of non-commissioned officers and enlisted personnel.

Rank group	Senior NCOs					Junior NCOs	Enlisted
Peruvian Navy						No insignia	No insignia
Peruvian Navy	Oficial de mar primero	Oficial de mar segundo	Oficial de mar tercero	Cabo primero	Cabo segundo	Marinero	Grumete

== Ships ==
Ships of the Peruvian Navy are prefixed BAP, which stands for Buque Armada Peruana (Peruvian Navy Ship).

=== Current ships ===
Ship	Origin	Type	Class	In service	Notes
Submarines (5 in service, 1 in upgrade)
BAP Angamos (SS-31)	Germany	diesel-electric submarine	Type 209/1200	Yes	ex-BAP Casma.
BAP Antofagasta (SS-32)	Germany	diesel-electric submarine	Type 209/1200	No	Currently being upgraded in SIMA Callao shipyard since January 2020.
BAP Pisagua (SS-33)	Germany	diesel-electric submarine	Type 209/1200	Yes	
BAP Chipana (SS-34)	Germany	diesel-electric submarine	Type 209/1200	Yes	ex-BAP Blume. Completed upgrades in 2025.
BAP Islay (SS-35)	Germany	diesel-electric submarine	Type 209/1100	Yes	Upgraded in 2008
BAP Arica (SS-36)	Germany	diesel-electric submarine	Type 209/1100	Yes	Upgraded in 2008
Guided missile frigates (7 in service)
BAP Villavicencio (FM-52)	Italy	guided missile frigate	Carvajal-class frigate	Yes	
BAP Almirante Grau (FM-53)	Peru	guided missile frigate	Carvajal-class frigate	Yes	Ordered in 1973. Laid down in SIMA Callao shipyard and commissioned in 1984 as BAP Montero until 2017, when became fleet flagship
BAP Mariátegui (FM-54)	Peru	guided missile frigate	Carvajal-class frigate	Yes	Ordered in 1973. Laid down in SIMA Callao shipyard and commissioned in 1987.
BAP Aguirre (FM-55)	Italy	guided missile frigate	Lupo-class frigate	Yes	ex-Orsa (F-567), overhauled and upgraded in SIMA Callao shipyard along with BAP Bolognesi. Currently in sea trials.
BAP Palacios (FM-56)	Italy	guided missile frigate	Lupo-class frigate	Yes	ex-Lupo (F-564)
BAP Bolognesi (FM-57)	Italy	guided missile frigate	Lupo-class frigate	Yes	ex-Perseo (F-566), overhauled and upgraded in SIMA Callao shipyard with locally made CMS and ESM systems, a Kronos NV 3D radar, MASS countermeasures system and 4 MM40 Block III Exocet missiles replacing Otomat.
BAP Quiñones (FM-58)	Italy	guided missile frigate	Lupo-class frigate	Yes	ex-Sagittario (F-565)
Guided missile corvettes (8 in service)
BAP Velarde (CM-21)	France	fast attack craft	PR-72P-class corvette	Yes	
BAP Santillana (CM-22)	France	fast attack craft	PR-72P-class corvette	Yes	
BAP De los Heros (CM-23)	France	fast attack craft	PR-72P-class corvette	Yes	
BAP Herrera (CM-24)	France	fast attack craft	PR-72P-class corvette	Yes	
BAP Larrea (CM-25)	France	fast attack craft	PR-72P-class corvette	Yes	
BAP Sánchez Carrión (CM-26)	France	fast attack craft	PR-72P-class corvette	Yes	
BAP Ferre (CM-27)	South Korea	fast attack craft	Pohang-class corvette	Yes	ex-Gyeonjyu (PCC-758). Built in 1985. Transferred from Republic of Korea Navy in July 2016.
BAP Guise (CM-28)	South Korea	fast attack craft	Pohang-class corvette	Yes	ex-Suncheon (PCC-767). Built in 1987. Transferred from Republic of Korea Navy in July 2021. Commissioned in 2022.
Offshore Patrols vessels (13 in service)
BAP Guardiamarina San Martin (PO-201)	Italy	Frigate	Lupo-class frigate	Yes	ex-BAP Carvajal (FM-51). Operated by the Peruvian Coast Guard
BAP Rio Pativilca (PM-204)	Peru	Offshore Patrol Vessel	PGCP-50 offshore patrol vessel	Yes	Ordered in 2013. Derived design of Taegeuk-class patrol vessel from Republic of Korea Navy. Laid down in SIMA Chimbote shipyard and commissioned on March 18, 2016. Operated by the Peruvian Coast Guard
BAP Rio Cañete (PM-205)	Peru	Offshore Patrol Vessel	PGCP-50 offshore patrol vessel	Yes	Ordered in 2013. Derived design of Taegeuk-class patrol vessel from Republic of Korea Navy. Laid down in SIMA Chimbote shipyard and commissioned on March 18, 2016. Operated by the Peruvian Coast Guard
BAP Rio Piura (PM-206)	Peru	Offshore Patrol Vessel	PGCP-50 offshore patrol vessel	Yes	Laid down in SIMA Chimbote shipyard and commissioned on May 3rd, 2017. Operated by the Peruvian Coast Guard
BAP Rio Quilca (PM-207)	Peru	Offshore Patrol Vessel	PGCP-50 offshore patrol vessel	Yes	Laid down in SIMA Chimbote shipyard and commissioned on May 3, 2017. Operated by the Peruvian Coast Guard
BAP Rio Tumbes (PM-208)	Peru	Offshore Patrol Vessel	PGCP-50 offshore patrol vessel	Yes	Laid down in SIMA Chimbote shipyard and commissioned on March 17, 2021. Operated by the Peruvian Coast Guard
BAP Rio Locumba (PM-209)	Peru	Offshore Patrol Vessel	PGCP-50 offshore patrol vessel	Yes	Laid down in SIMA Chimbote shipyard and commissioned on March 17, 2021. Operated by the Peruvian Coast Guard
BAP Río Chira (PC-223)	Peru	Offshore Patrol Vessel	PGM 71 class	Yes	Commissioned in June 1972; originally transferred from Navy to Coast Guard in 1975, then paid off in 1994, restored to service in 1997 after engines refurbished. Operated by the Peruvian Coast Guard
BAP Río Nepeña (PC-243)	Peru	Offshore Patrol Vessel	Rio Cañete class	Yes	Commissioned on December 1, 1981; refitted between 1996 and 1998. Operated by the Peruvian Coast Guard
BAP Río Tambo (PC-244)	Peru	Offshore Patrol Vessel	Rio Cañete class	Yes	Commissioned in 1982; refitted between 1996 and 1998. Operated by the Peruvian Coast Guard
BAP Río Ocoña (PC-245)	Peru	Offshore Patrol Vessel	Rio Cañete class	Yes	Commissioned in 1983; refitted in 1996. Operated by the Peruvian Coast Guard
BAP Río Huarmey (PC-246)	Peru	Offshore Patrol Vessel	Rio Cañete class	Yes	Commissioned in 1984; refitted between 1996 and 1998. Operated by the Peruvian Coast Guard
BAP Río Zaña (PC-247)	Peru	Offshore Patrol Vessel	Rio Cañete class	Yes	Commissioned on February 12, 1985; refitted between 1996 and 1998. Operated by the Peruvian Coast Guard
Amphibious (11 in service)
BAP Pisco (AMP-156)	Peru	Landing Platform, Dock	Makassar class	Yes	Ordered on July 13, 2013; laid down in SIMA Callao shipyard, launched on April 25, 2017; commissioned on June 21, 2018.
BAP Paita (AMP-157)	Peru	Landing Platform, Dock	Makassar class	Yes	Ordered on March 15, 2018; laid down in SIMA Callao shipyard.
BAP Callao (DT-143)	United States	Landing Ship, Tank	Terrebonne Parish class	No	ex-USS Washoe County. Sunk as target 30 September 2021
BAP Eten (DT-144)	United States	Landing Ship, Tank	Terrebonne Parish class	Yes	ex-USS Traverse County
Seven in service	United Kingdom	Landing Craft Air Cushion	Griffon Hoverwork 2000TD	Yes	
River gunboats vessels (6 in service)
BAP Loreto (CF-11)	United States	River gunboat	Loreto class	Yes	
BAP Amazonas (CF-12)	United States	River gunboat	Loreto class	Yes	
BAP Marañón (CF-13)	United Kingdom	River gunboat	Marañón class	Yes	
BAP Ucayali (CF-14)	United Kingdom	River gunboat	Marañón class	Yes	On 2 May, 2025 she struck the anchored oil barge El Manati resulting in a hull breach and sank in shallow water partially submerged in the Amazon River near the Napo River some 50 miles downstream from Iquitos, Peru.
BAP Clavero (CF-15)	Peru	River gunboat	Clavero class	Yes	Laid down in the SIMA Iquitos shipyard. Damaged by an uncontrolled fire in her first operational deployment on May 25, 2010; leaving two crewmen badly injured. Returned to service on July 27, 2012, during the BRACOLPER 2012 exercise.
BAP Castilla (CF-16)	Peru	River gunboat	Clavero class	Yes	Laid down on April 9, 2010, in the SIMA Iquitos shipyard, launched on June 8, 2013, and commissioned on March 14, 2016, second and final ship of its class, has some improvements over its sister ship, mainly in armament
Training ships (3 in service)
BAP Unión (BEV-161)	Peru	Sail training ship	–	Yes	laid down on December 8, 2012, in the SIMA Callao shipyard, commissioned January 27, 2016, with an estimated cost of US$50 million.
BAP Marte (ALY-313)	Canada	Sailing yacht	–	Yes	assigned to the Peruvian Naval School as a training ship
BAP Neptuno	Peru	Sail training ship	–	Yes	
Tugs and support ships (5 in service)
BAP Unanue (AMB-160)	United States	Diving support ship	Sotoyomo class	Yes	ex-USS Wateree
BAP San Lorenzo (ART-323)	Germany	Torpedo recovery vessel	–	Yes	
BAP Morales (RAS-180)	Peru	Diving support offshore tugboat	Morales class	Yes	Ordered in 2014, 50 TBP class locally designed tugboat, equipped to support diving, firefighting and rescue operations. Delivered in November 2016
BAP Selendón (ARB-129)	Peru	Harbour tugboat	20 TBP class tug	Yes	Built in SIMA Callao shipyard, ordered in 2011. Delivered in the first quarter of 2012.
BAP Medina (ARB-130)	Peru	Harbour tugboat	20 TBP class tug	Yes	Built in SIMA Callao shipyard, ordered in 2011. Delivered in late 2012.
Tankers and barges (4 in service)
BAP Caloyeras (ACA-111)	United States	Water barge	YW-83 class	Yes	ex-US YW-128
BAP Noguera (ACP-118)	United States	Fuel barge	YO type	Yes	ex-US YO-221
BAP Gauden (ACP-119)	United States	Fuel barge	YO type	Yes	ex-US YO-171
BAP Tacna (ARL-158)	Netherlands	Replenishment Ship	Amsterdam class	Yes	ex-HNLMS Amsterdam; Built in 1995, acquired in July 2014 from the Royal Netherlands Navy, commissioned on December 4, 2014, at the Den Helder naval base, Netherlands.
Hospital vessels (10 in service, 1 in construction)
BAP Rio Yavarí	Peru	River hospital ship	Yavarí PIAS class	Yes	Built by Sima Iquitos shipyard, commissioned in 2021.
BAP Rio Putumayo II	Peru	River hospital ship	Napo PIAS class	Yes	Built in Sima Iquitos shipyard, commissioned in 2016.
BAP Rio Putumayo I	Peru	River hospital ship	Napo PIAS class	Yes	Built in Sima Iquitos shipyard, commissioned in 2015.
BAP Morona	Peru	River hospital ship	Napo PIAS class	Yes	Built in Sima Iquitos shipyard, commissioned in 2015.
BAP Rio Napo	Peru	River hospital ship	Napo PIAS class	Yes	Built in Sima Iquitos shipyard, commissioned in 2013.
BAP Rio Yahuas (ABH-302)	Peru	River hospital ship	Morona class	Yes	Ex BAP Morona (ABH-302)
BAP Corrientes (ABH-303)	Peru	Small river hospital craft	–	Yes	
BAP Curaray (ABH-304)	Peru	Small river hospital craft	–	Yes	
BAP Pastaza (ABH-305)	Peru	Small river hospital craft	–	Yes	
BAP Lago Titicaca I	Peru	Lake hospital ship	Lago Titicaca PIAS class	Yes	Built by SIMA Peru, commissioned in 2017.
BAP Puno (ABH-306)	United Kingdom	Lake hospital ship	Yaravi class	Yes	ex-Yapura operated by the Peruvian Coast Guard
Scientific research vessels (6 in service)
BAP Carrasco (BOP-171)	Spain	Oceanographic research ship	NC-704 class	Yes	95-m long steel-hulled vessel designed to operate in the Antarctic region as well as in Peruvian waters. Construction contract signed in December 2014 with Freire Shipyard. Keel-laying scheduled for June 22, 2015, to be delivered July 2016. Commissioned in May 2017.
BAP Stiglich (AH-172)	Peru	Hydrographic survey ship	Morona class	Yes	
BAP Zimic (COMBSH-173)	Netherlands	Hydrographic survey ship	Dokkum class	Yes	ex-HNLMS Abcoude minesweeper. ex-BAP Carrasco, repowered in 2006 with 2 Volvo Penta engines at SIMA Callao, in 2015 received a high power multibeam echosounder.
BAP La Macha (AEH-174)	Peru	Hydrographic survey ship	–	Yes	
BAP Carrillo (AH-175)	Netherlands	Hydrographic survey ship	Van Straelen class	Yes	ex-HNLMS van Hamel minesweeper
BAP Melo (AH-176)	Netherlands	Hydrographic survey ship	Van Straelen class	Yes	ex-HNLMS van der Wel minesweeper. Repowered in 2006 with 2 Volvo Penta engines at SIMA Callao.

=== Museum ships ===
Vessel	Origin	Type	Class	Decommissioned	Notes
BAP América (RH-90)	United Kingdom	River gunboat	América class		restored at SIMA Iquitos shipyard, on display in Clavero naval station.
BAP Abtao (SS-42)	United States	Sierra-type submarine	2 de Mayo class	1998	become a museum ship in 2004
Yavarí	United Kingdom	Lake gunboat	Yavarí class	1976	restored and become a museum ship in 2015 and is the oldest iron lake steamer sailing.

=== Recently decommissioned ships ===
Vessel	Origin	Type	Class	Decommissioned	Notes
BAP Bayovar (ATP-154)	Russia	Oil tanker	Grigoriy Nesterenko type	2017	ex-Petr Schmidt, auctioned on March 21, 2018
BAP Zorritos (ATP-155)	Russia	Oil tanker	Grigoriy Nesterenko type	2017	ex-Grigoriy Nesterenko, auctioned on March 21, 2018
BAP Almirante Grau (CLM-81)	Netherlands	Light cruiser	De Zeven Provinciën class	26 September 2017	ex-HNLMS De Ruyter (C801)
BAP Guardian Rios (ARA-123)	United States	Offshore tugboat	Cherokee class	2015	ex-USS Pinto, inactive since 2014, to be scrapped
BAP Dueñas (ARB-126)	United States	Harbour tugboat	PC-461-class	2015	ex-USS PC-1138, decommissioned in 1956 and sold, then first converted into icebreaker and finally into a tugboat (hull shortened), acquired by the Peruvian Navy in 1984. Inactive since 2014, to be scrapped
BAP Unión (ABE-161)	Peru	Transport ship	Ilo class	December 2014	ex-BAP Mollendo (ATC-131). Decommissioned in late 2014, towed to be scrapped in Ecuador.
BAP Carvajal (FM-51)	Italy	Guided missile frigate	Carvajal-class frigate	26 December 2013	Transferred to the Coast Guard under the name BAP Guardiamarina San Martin (PO-201) after being stripped down of its missile weaponry and main radar, reclassified as Patrullera Oceánica (Offshore patrol vessel).
BAP Paita (DT-141)	United States	Tank landing ship	Terrebonne Parish class	September 2012	ex-USS Walworth County (LST-1164), sunk as a target during the exercise Independencia
BAP Pisco (DT-142)	United States	Landing Ship, Tank	Terrebonne Parish class	2012	ex-USS Waldo County (LST-1163), scrapped that year after sold.
BAP Ferré (DM-74)	United Kingdom	Guided missile destroyer	Daring class	13 July 2007	ex-HMS Decoy
BAP Talara (ATP-152)	Peru	Replenishment tanker	Talara class	12 August 2008	capable of underway replenishment at sea from the stern
BAP Lobitos (ATP-153)	Peru	Oil tanker	Sealift Pacific class	20 July 2008	ex-USNS Sealift Caribbean (T-AOT-174)

== Equipment ==
Name	Origin	Type	Version	Used by	Notes
Naval artillery
Oto Melara 127/54 Compact Gun	Italy	dual-purpose naval gun	127/54 Compact	Lupo-class	
Oto Melara 76/62 Compact Gun	Italy	dual-purpose naval gun	76/62 Compact	PR-72P-class	
Oto Melara Twin 40 Compact Gun	Italy	Close-in weapon system (CIWS)	Twin Forty	Lupo-class; PR-72P-class; Makassar-class	
Anti-ship missiles
MBDA Otomat	Italy	Anti-ship missile (AShM)	Otomat II Block 1	Lupo-class	on December 8, 2008, an updated Otomat missile was successfully launched from BAP Aguirre, hit a target at a range in excess of 150 km (93 mi).
MBDA Exocet	France	Anti-ship missile (AShM)	MM40 Block 3	Lupo-class	four fire control systems and sixteen missiles ordered on December 15, 2010. Scheduled to be installed in the 4 Aguirre class frigates.
MBDA Exocet	France	Anti-ship missile (AShM)	MM38	PR-72P-class	
MBDA Exocet	France	Anti-ship missile (AShM)	AM39 Block 1	ASH-3D Sea King	Land-based. Currently not embarked in any surface unit of the Peruvian Navy
Surface-to-air missile
MBDA Aspide	Italy	Surface-to-air missile (SAM)	Aspide 1A	Lupo-class	
9K38 Igla	Russia	MANPADS	9K310 Igla-1	PR-72P-class; Peruvian Naval Infantry	used in MGP-86 mount for close air defence to be replaced with the FN-6 missile system
FN-6	China	MANPADS	FN-6	Peruvian Naval Infantry	a small batch acquired in July 2009 for US$1.1 million
Torpedoes
Atlas Elektronik SUT	Germany	533 mm heavyweight torpedo	SUT 264	Type 209 submarine	
Atlas Elektronik SST	Germany	533 mm heavyweight torpedo	SST-4 mod 0	Type 209 submarine	
Mark 44 torpedo	United States	324 mm lightweight torpedo	Mk 44 mod 1	Lupo-class; AB-212ASW; ASH-3D	
Alenia-Whitehead A244/S	Italy	324 mm lightweight torpedo	A244/S	Lupo-class; AB-212ASW; ASH-3D	

== Peacekeeping operations ==
The Peruvian Navy has been actively involved in several United Nations Peacekeeping Operations. As of June 2006 Naval Infantry and Special Operations troops have been deployed to United Nations Peacekeeping Force in Cyprus (UNFICYP) (embedded in the Argentine forces ) and United Nations Stabilization Mission in Haiti (MINUSTAH). Peruvian naval officers have also been deployed to United Nations Organization Mission in the Democratic Republic of the Congo (MONUC), United Nations Operation in Côte d'Ivoire (UNOCI), United Nations Mission in Sudan (UNMIS) as United Nations Militar Observers (UNMOs). By 2012 the Peruvian Navy sent its first officer to serve in United Nations Interim Security Force for Abyei.

== Gallery ==
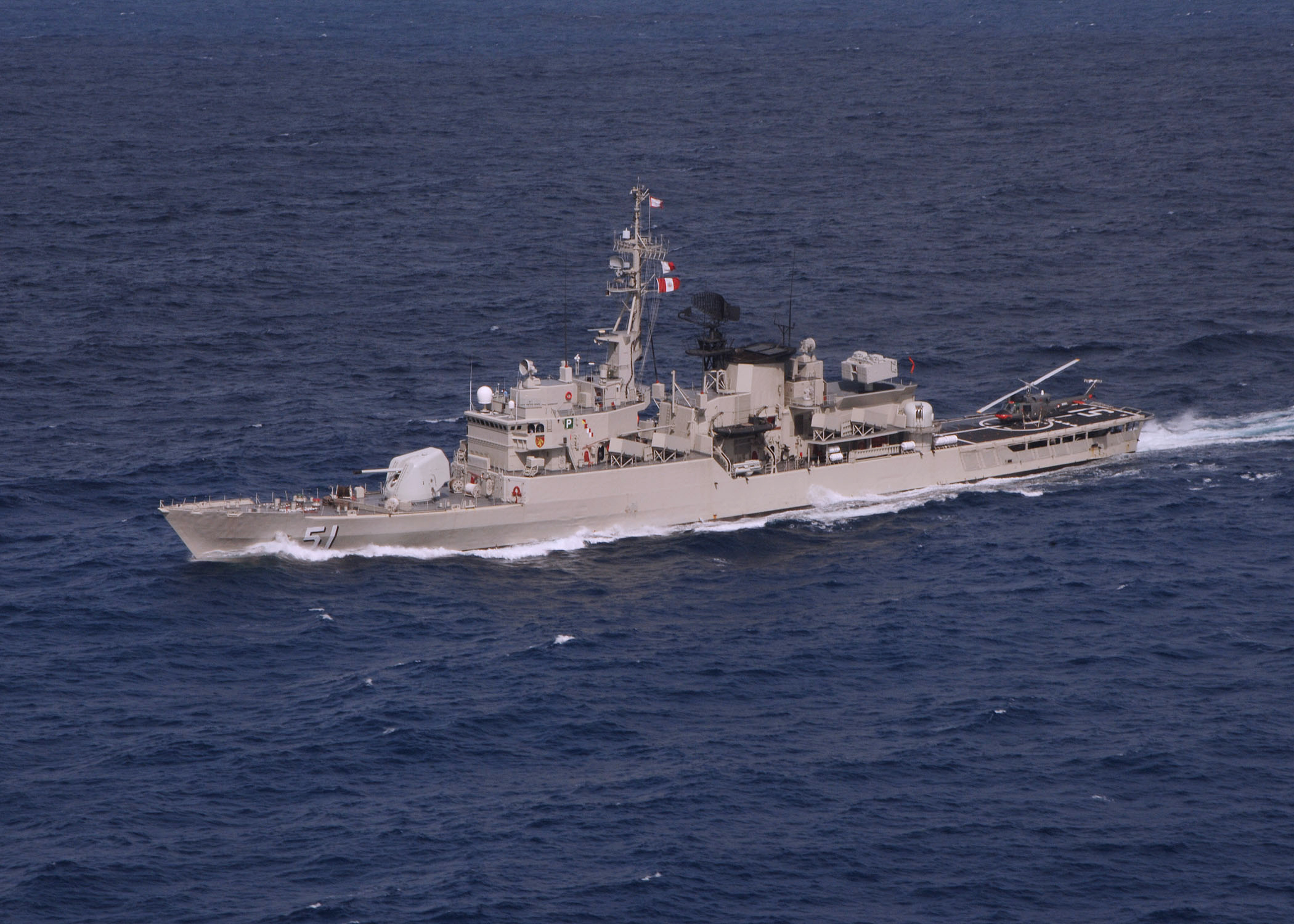
BAP Carvajal (FM-51).

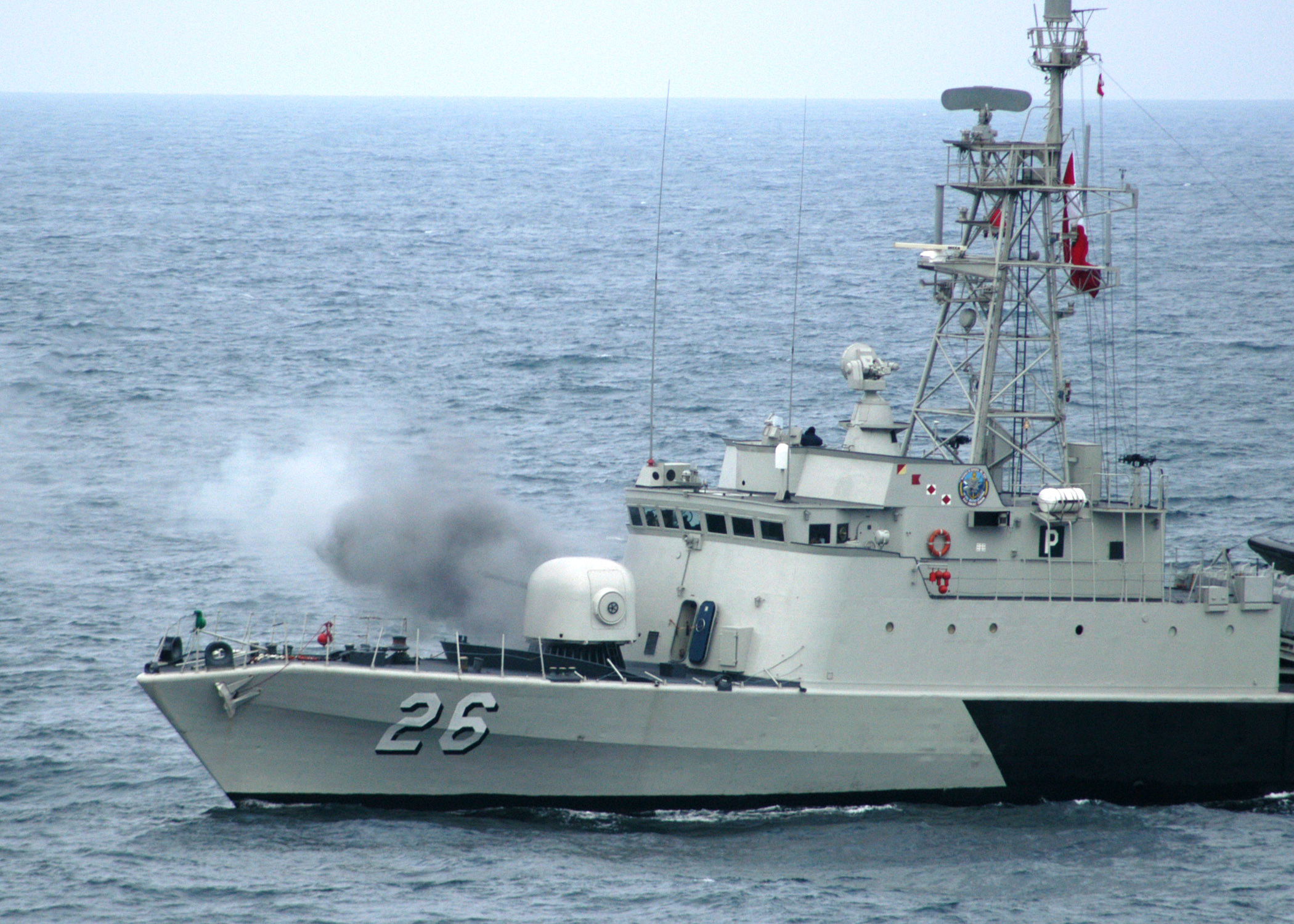
BAP Sánchez Carrión (CM-26).

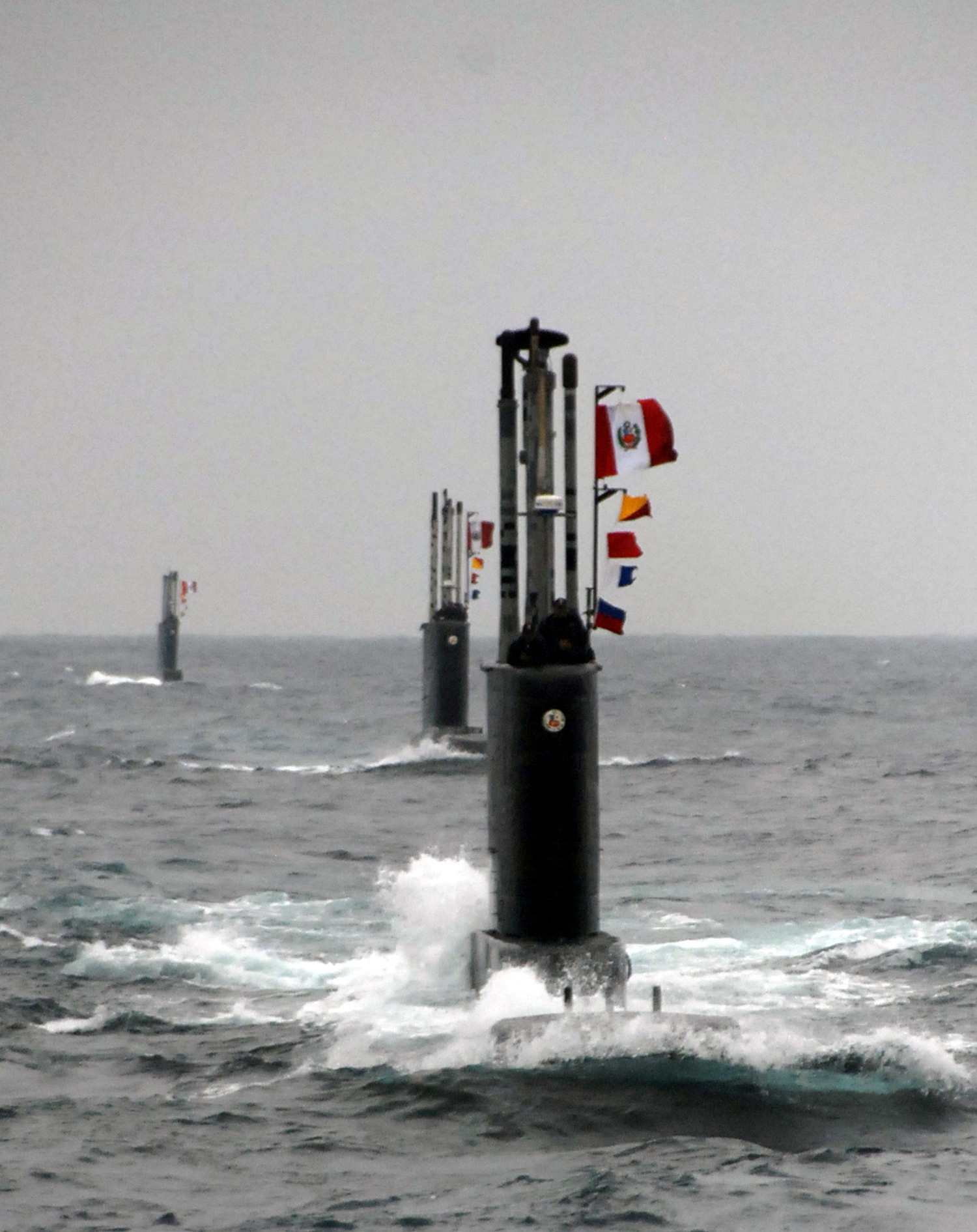
Submarines BAP Pisagua (SS-33), BAP Chipana (SS-34), and BAP Islay (SS-35).

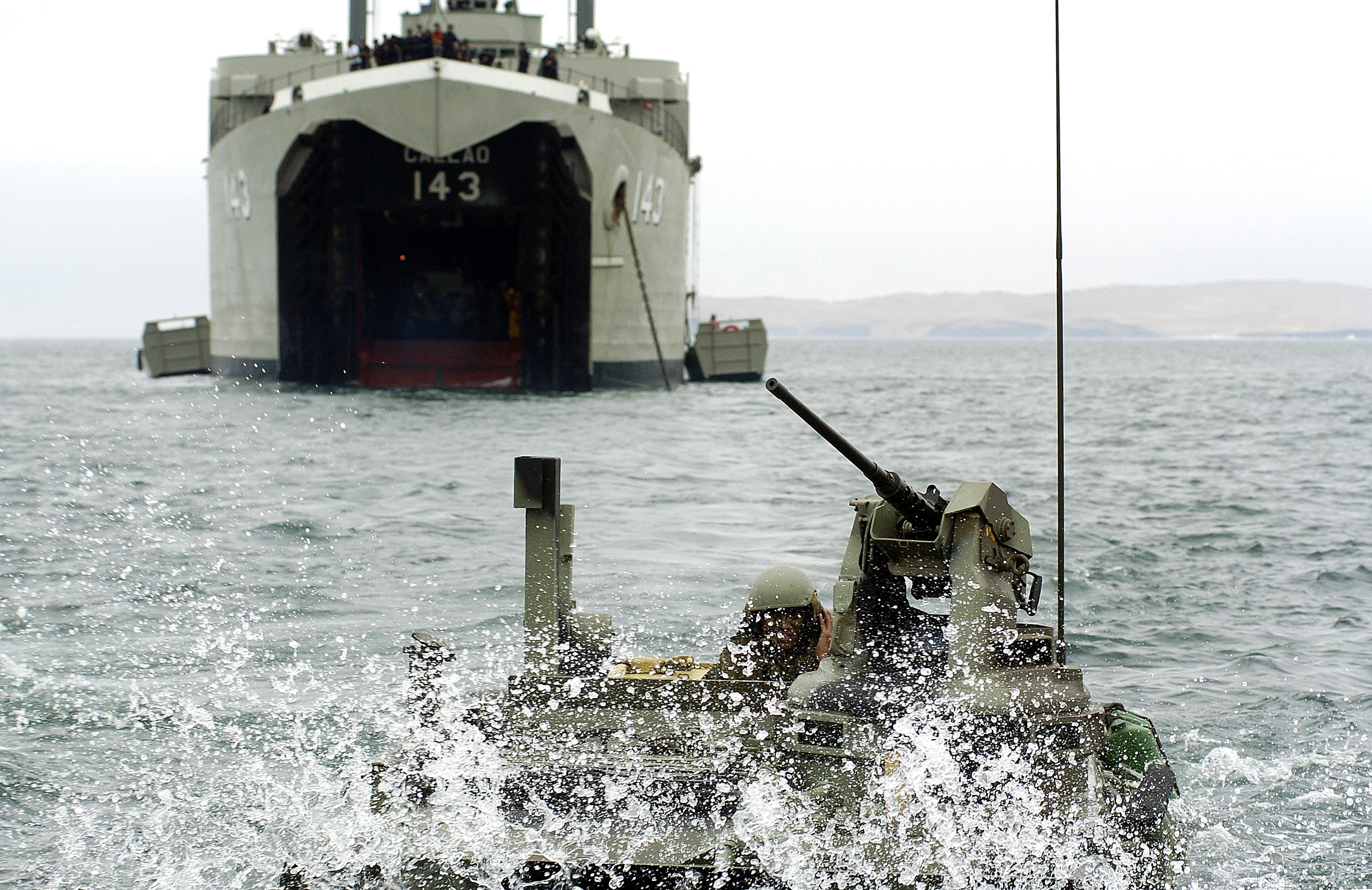
Naval infantry coming ashore from BAP Callao (DT-143).

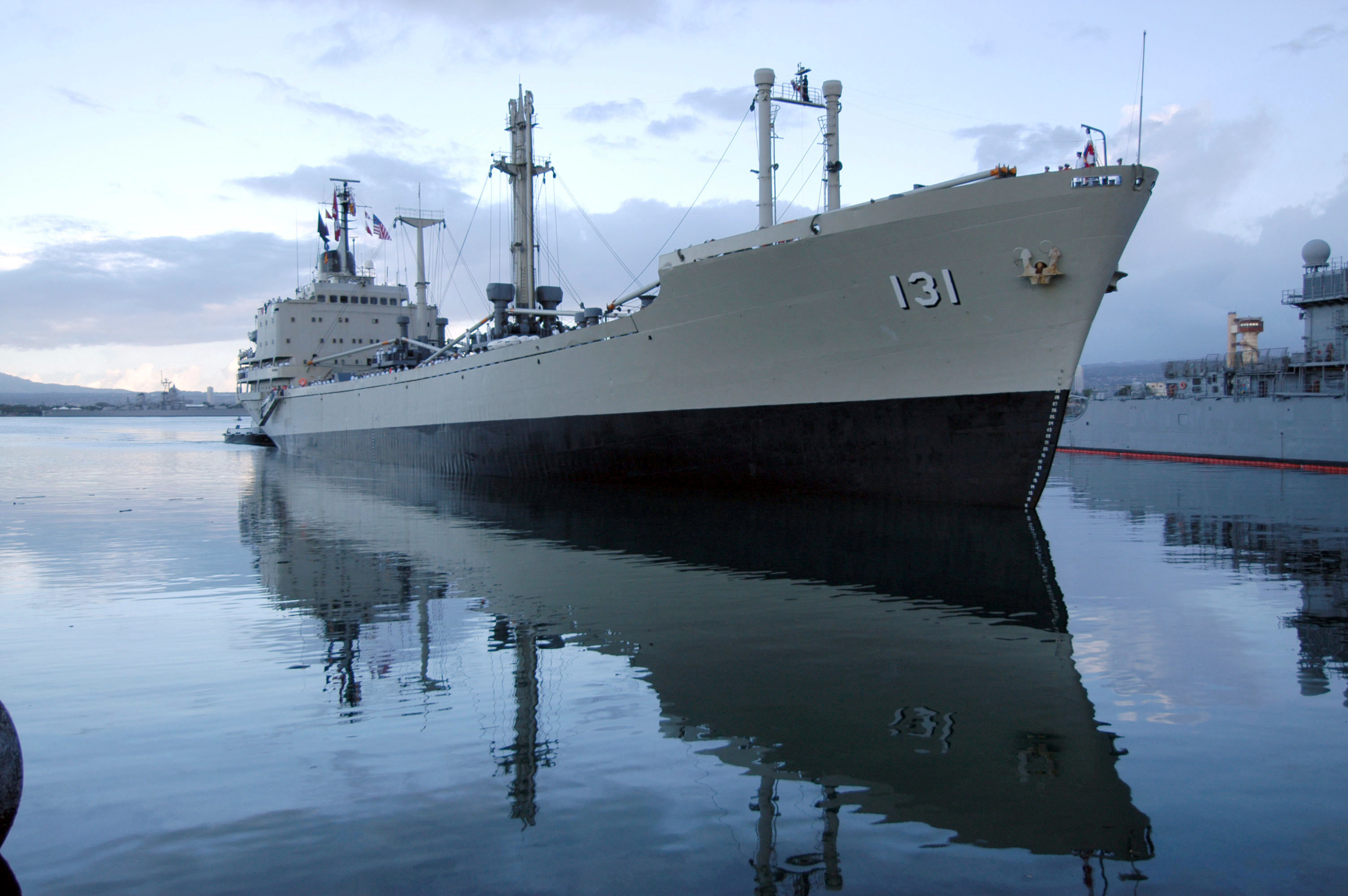
BAP Mollendo (ATC-131).

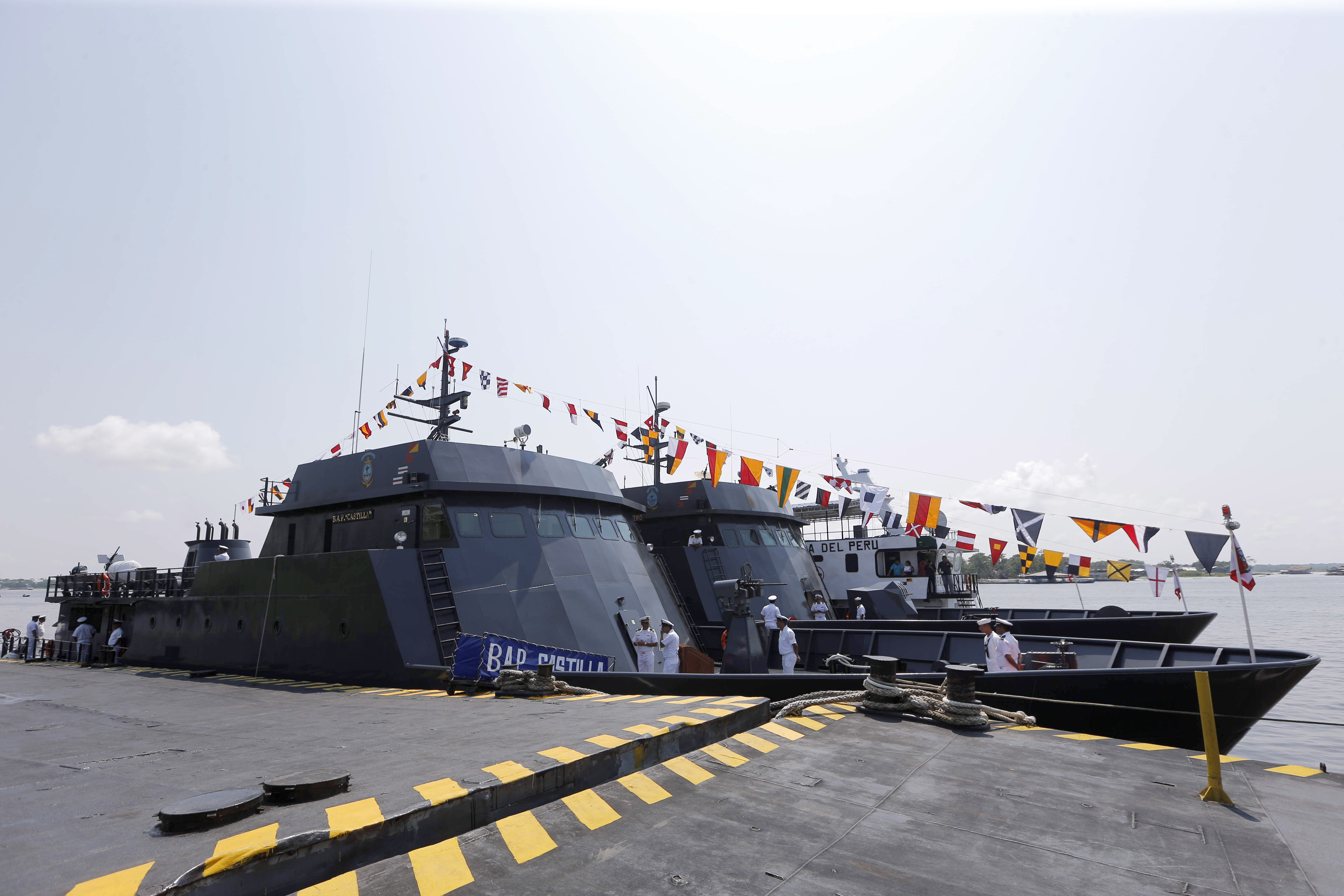
BAP Clavero and BAP Castilla berthed in Iquitos Naval Base

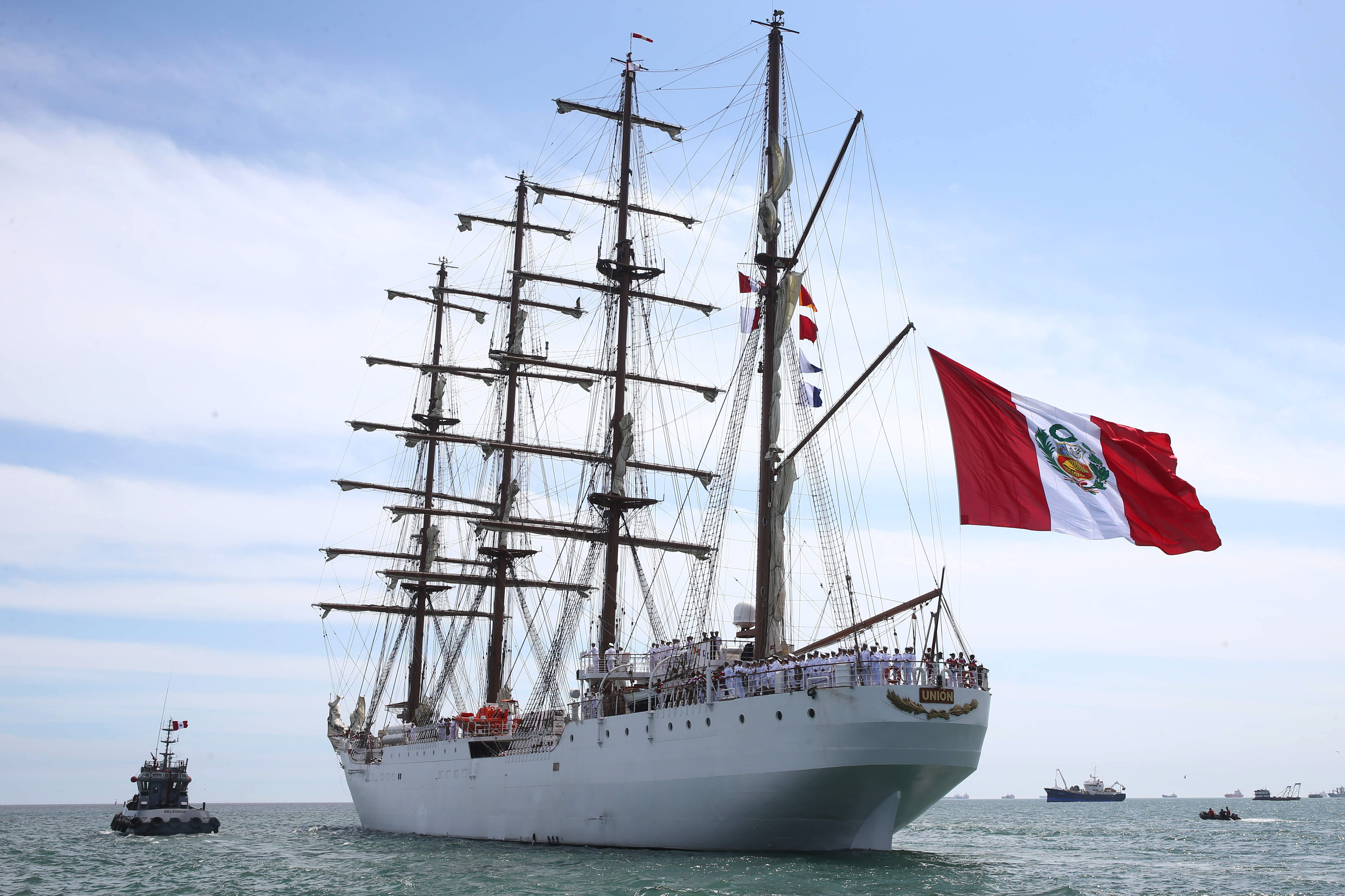
BAP Unión leaving the Callao harbour

== See also ==
- Battle of Angamos
- Battle of Iquique
- Battle of Pacocha
- Ironclad Huáscar
- Miguel Grau
- SIFOREX
- War of the Pacific
- List of Peruvian steam frigates

== Sources ==
- Baker III, Arthur D., The Naval Institute Guide to Combat Fleets of the World 2002–2003. Naval Institute Press, 2002.
- Basadre, Jorge, Historia de la República del Perú. Editorial Universitaria, 1983.
- "La base de Chimbote", Caretas, 855: 31 (June 17, 1985).
- Gibbs, Jay (2005). "Question 30/04: The Bolivian Navy in the War of the Pacific". Warship International. XLII (3): 242–247. ISSN 0043-0374.
- Ortiz Sotelo, Jorge, Apuntes para la historia de los submarinos peruanos. Biblioteca Nacional, 2001.
- Pixley, William & Walker, Hartley P. (2001). "Question 33/00: Peruvian Warships Loa and Victoria". Warship International. XXXVIII (3). International Naval Research Organization: 248. ISSN 0043-0374.
- Rial, Juan, Los militares tras el fin del régimen de Fujimori-Montesinos.
- "Los Programas de Renovacion y Modernizacion de la Marina de Guerra del Peru", Alejo Marchessini – Revista Fuerzas de Defensa y Seguridad (FDS) N° 430. Paginas 32 a 35.
- "Entrevista al Almirante Carlos Tejada Mera, Comandante General de la MArina de Guerra del Peru", Alejo Marchessini – Revista Fuerzas de Defensa y Seguridad (FDS) N° 430. Paginas 36 a 43.
