= General Commander of the Peruvian Navy =

General Commander of the Navy
- Comandante General de la Marina de Guerra del Perú

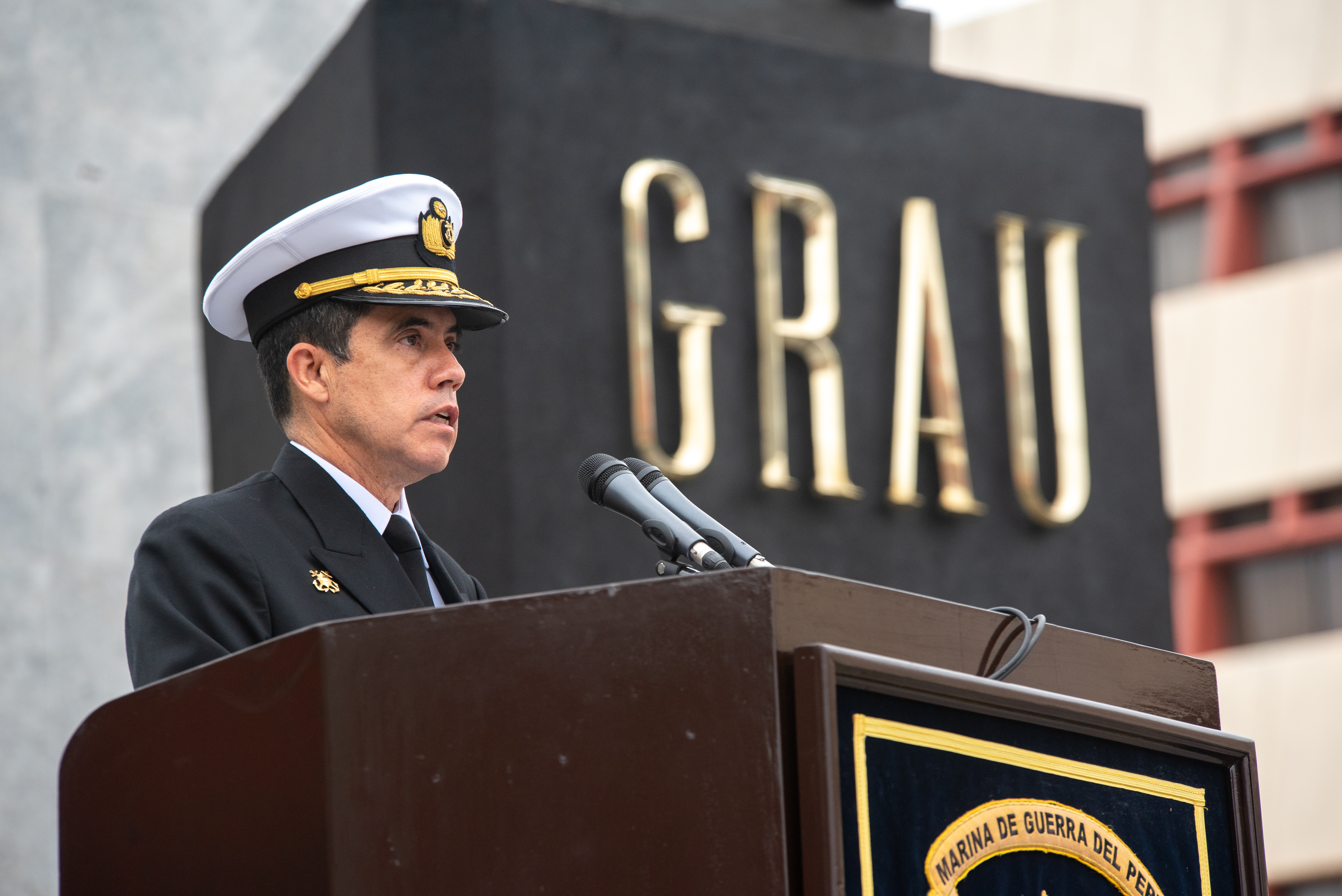
- Incumbent; Alberto Alcalá Luna since 5 August 2021
- Reports to: Chief of the Joint Command
- Constituting instrument: 10 of Law No. 28359

The General Commander of the Navy (Spanish: Comandante General de la Marina de Guerra del Perú) is the professional head of the Peruvian Navy

== List of officeholders ==
Officeholder	Rank	Start of term	End of term
Miguel Grau Seminario	Capitán de Navío	1 June 1877	13 July 1878
Antonio A. de la Haza	Contralmirante	13 July 1878	1879
Juan Francisco Torres Matos			
Fernando Lino Zamudio			
Jorge Luna Ferreccio			June 1968
Mario Castro de Mendoza		June 1968	October 1968
Raúl Ríos Pardo de Zela		3 October 1968	
Jorge Parodi Galliani		1978	1978
Carlos Tirado Alcorta		1979	1979
Juan Egúsquiza Babilonia		1980	1980
Jorge Du Bois Gervasi		1981	December 1982
Ricardo Zevallos Newton		January 1983	
Gerónimo Cafferata Marazzi		January 1985	December 1985
Víctor Nicolini del Castillo		January 1986	
Oscar Jahnsen Raygada		1989	
Alfonso Panizo Zariquiey		1989	28 July 1990
Luis Montes Lecaros		28 July 1990	December 1991
Alfredo Arnáiz Ambrosiani		December 1991	January 1996
Américo Ibárcena		January 1996	28 October 2000
Victor Ricardo Ramos Ormeño		28 October 2000	April 2001
Luis Ernesto Vargas Caballero Cooban		April 2001	14 August 2001
Alfredo Palacios Dongo		14 August 2001	13 November 2001
Ricardo Arboccó Licetti		13 November 2001	
José Luis Noriega Lores	Admiral		2004
Jorge Ampuero Trabucco		2004	2006
Eduardo Darcourt Adrianzén	Admiral	2007	1 January 2009
Carlos Gamarra Elías	Admiral	1 January 2008	1 January 2009
Rolando Navarrete Salomón	Admiral	1 January 2009	6 December 2010
Jorge de la Puente Ribeyro	Admiral	6 December 2010	1 January 2012
José Ernesto Cueto Aservi	Vice Admiral	1 January 2012	18 May 2012
Carlos Tejada Mera	Vice Admiral	18 May 2012	31 December 2014
Edmundo Deville del Campo	Vice Admiral	1 January 2015	30 December 2016
Gonzalo Nicolás Ríos Polastri	Admiral	30 December 2016	2 November 2018
Fernando Raúl Cerdán Ruiz	Admiral	2 November 2018	2 November 2020
Ricardo Menendéz Calle	Admiral	2 November 2020	3 August 2021
Alberto Alcalá Luna	Admiral	3 August 2021	
