= List of Peruvian steam frigates =

This is a list of Peruvian Steam frigates of the period 1852-1881:

Ship name	Ship type	Origin	Commissioned	Guns	Fate
Amazonas	screw frigate	United Kingdom	1852	34	Ship runs aground and lost in Punta Quilque (Chile), 1866
Apurímac	screw frigate	United Kingdom	1855	36	Ship scuttled in the Callao harbour to prevent capture, 1881
Independencia	broadside ironclad frigate	United Kingdom	1866	28	Ship collide with a submerged rock and sank during the chase of the schooner Covadonga near Iquique (Perú, now Chile), 1879
