= BAP Angamos =

Peruvian submarine

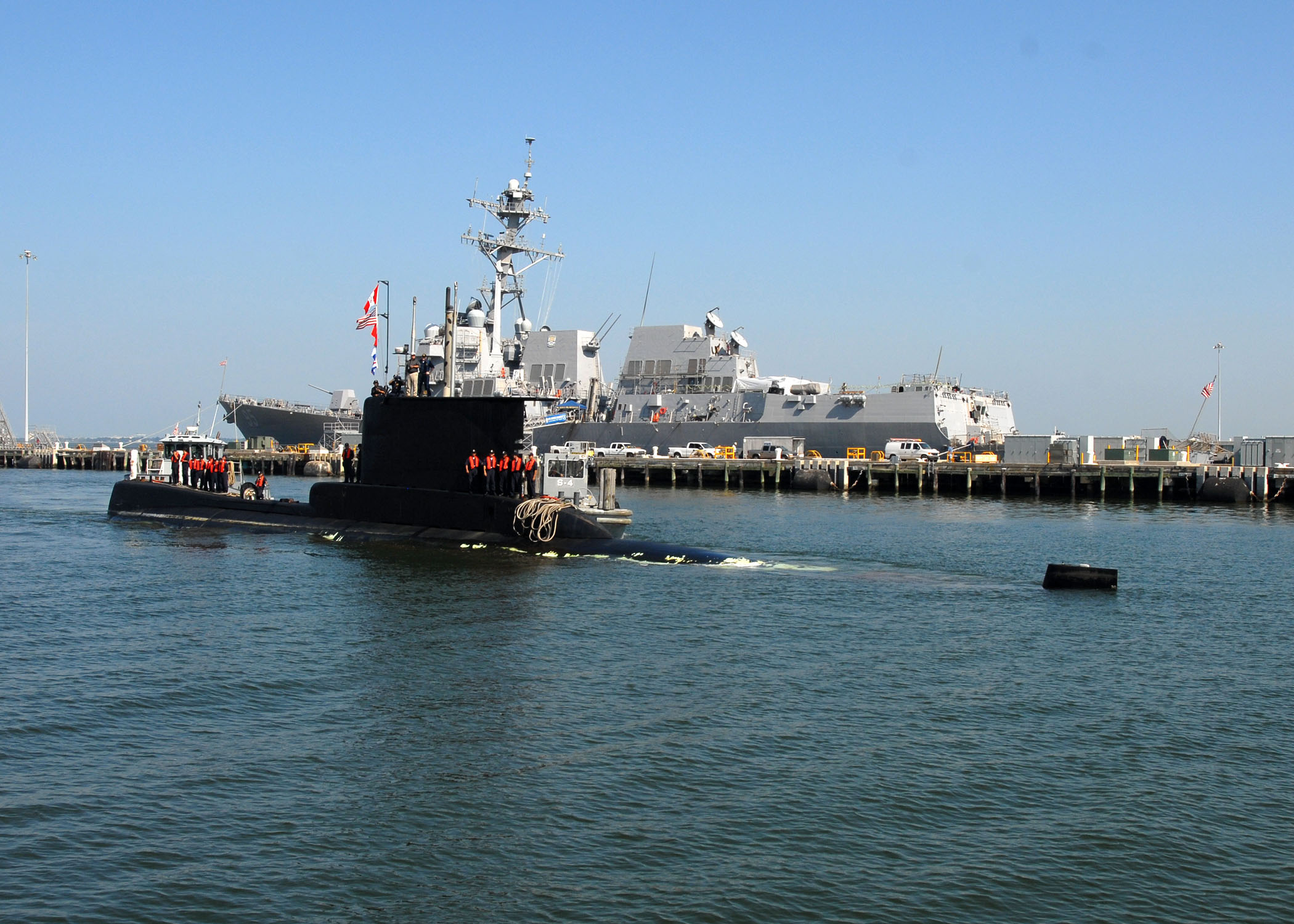
- BAP Angamos (SS-31) at Naval Station Norfolk (2010)

History

Peru
- Name: Angamos
- Ordered: August 12, 1976
- Builder: Howaldtswerke Deutsche Werft AG
- Laid down: 15 July 1977
- Launched: 31 August 1979
- Commissioned: 19 December 1980
- Home port: Callao
- Motto: Seguid su ejemplo, perseverantes y agresivos

General characteristics
- Class & type: Type 209/1200
- Displacement: 1,180 t surfaced; 1,285 t submerged
- Length: 55.9 m
- Beam: 6.4 m
- Draft: 5.9 m
- Propulsion: 4 MTU Type 12V493 AZ80 GA31L diesel engines; 1 Siemens electric motor; 1 shaft; 4,600 hp (3,400 kW)
- Speed: 11 knots surfaced; 21 knots (39 km/h) submerged
- Range: 11,300 nm surfaced at 4 knots (7.4 km/h)
- Endurance: 40 days on patrol
- Complement: 5 officers, 26 enlisted
- Armament: 8 × 21 in (533 mm) torpedo tubes; 14 SST-4 torpedoes

BAP Angamos (SS-31) is one of two Type 209/1200 submarines ordered by the Peruvian Navy on August 12, 1976. She was built by the German shipbuilder Howaldtswerke Deutsche Werft AG at its shipyard in Kiel. She was originally named Casma after a battle which took place between naval forces of Peru and Chile on January 12, 1839. Following sea trials in the North Sea, she arrived to its homeport of Callao in 1981. After a major overhaul by Servicio Industrial de la Marina at Callao SIMA in 1998, she was renamed Angamos after the battle of the same name which took place on October 8, 1879.

== Sources ==
- Baker III, Arthur D., The Naval Institute Guide to Combat Fleets of the World 2002-2003. Naval Institute Press, 2002.
- Ortiz Sotelo, Jorge, Apuntes para la historia de los submarinos peruanos. Biblioteca Nacional, 2001.
- Scheina, Robert L. & Smigelski, Adam (1995). "Peru". In Chumbley, Stephen (ed.). Conway's All the World's Fighting Ships, 1947–1995 (revised ed.). Naval Institute Press. pp. 303–307. ISBN 1-55750-132-7.
