= BAP Pisagua =

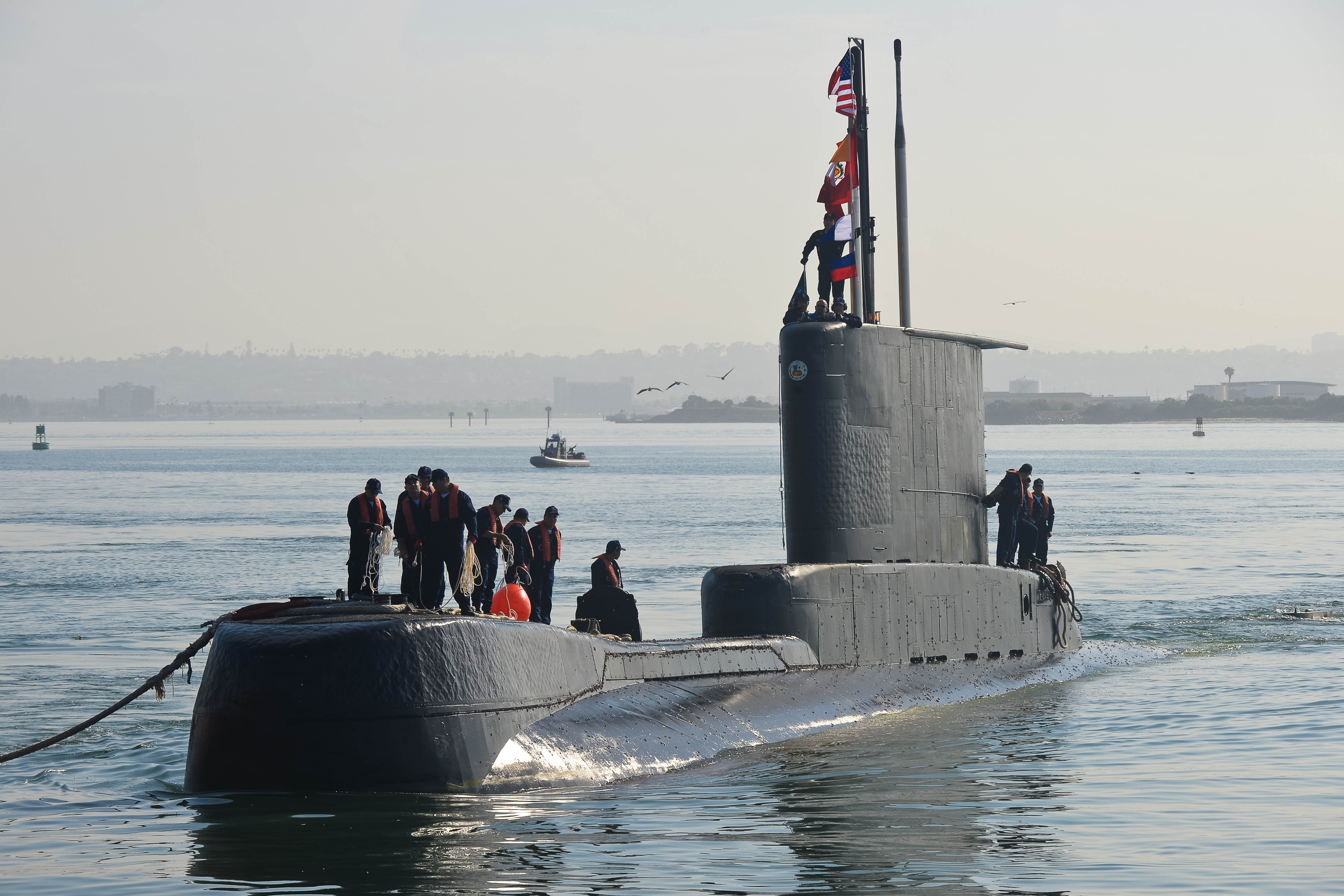
- BAP Pisagua (SS-33) in July 2017

History

Peru
- Name: Pisagua
- Laid down: 15 August 1978
- Launched: 19 October 1980
- Commissioned: 12 July 1983
- Home port: Callao
- Motto: Vencer

General characteristics
- Displacement: 1,180 t surfaced; 1,285 t submerged
- Length: 55.9 m
- Beam: 6.4 m
- Draft: 5.9 m
- Propulsion: 4 MTU Type 12V493 AZ80 GA31L diesel engines; 1 Siemens electric motor; 1 shaft; 4,600 hp (3,400 kW)
- Speed: 11 knots surfaced; 21 knots (39 km/h) submerged
- Range: 11,300 nm surfaced at 4 knots (7.4 km/h)
- Endurance: 40 days on patrol
- Complement: 5 officers, 26 enlisted
- Armament: 8 × 21 in (533 mm) torpedo tubes; 14 SST-4 torpedoes

BAP Pisagua (SS-33) is one of two Type 209/1200 submarines ordered by the Peruvian Navy on 21 March 1977. It was built by the German shipbuilder Howaldtswerke Deutsche Werft AG at its shipyard in Kiel. It is named after the battle of Pisagua which took place between Chilean warships and Peruvian coastal artillery on 2 November 1879. While undergoing sea trials in the North Sea, it collided with a Soviet ship on 8 April 1982 and suffered damage which delayed its commissioning. It eventually arrived to its homeport of Callao in 1983.

== Sources ==
- Baker III, Arthur D., The Naval Institute Guide to Combat Fleets of the World 2002-2003. Naval Institute Press, 2002.
- Ortiz Sotelo, Jorge, Apuntes para la historia de los submarinos peruanos. Biblioteca Nacional, 2001.
- Scheina, Robert L. & Smigelski, Adam (1995). "Peru". In Chumbley, Stephen (ed.). Conway's All the World's Fighting Ships, 1947–1995 (revised ed.). Naval Institute Press. pp. 303–307. ISBN 1-55750-132-7.
