= USS PC-1138 =

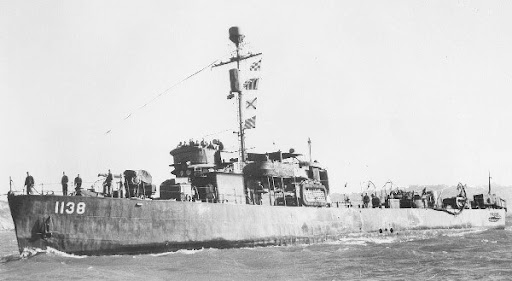
- USS PC-1138

History

United States
- Name: USS PC-1138
- Builder: Defoe Shipbuilding Company, Bay City, Michigan
- Laid down: 9 January 1943
- Launched: 19 April 1943
- Commissioned: 17 September 1943
- Decommissioned: 13 September 1946
- Renamed: Lapeer, 1 February 1956
- Namesake: Lapeer, Michigan
- Stricken: 1 April 1959
- Fate: Sold

General characteristics
- Class & type: PC-461-class submarine chaser
- Displacement: 295 long tons (300 t)
- Length: 173 ft 8 in (52.93 m)
- Beam: 23 ft (7.0 m)
- Draft: 8 ft (2.4 m)
- Speed: 20 knots (37 km/h; 23 mph)
- Complement: 66
- Armament: 1 × 3 in (76 mm)/50 cal gun; 1 × 40 mm gun; 5 × 20 mm guns; 2 × depth charge tracks; 2 × depth charge projectors; 2 × rocket launchers

USS PC-1138 was a PC-461-class submarine chaser built for the United States Navy during World War II. She was later renamed Lapeer (PC-1138) but never saw active service under that name.

== Career ==
PC-1138 was laid down at the Defoe Shipbuilding Company in Bay City, Michigan, on 9 January 1943; launched on 19 April 1943; and commissioned at New Orleans, Louisiana, on 17 September 1943. After shakedown off Florida, PC-1138 departed New Orleans on 14 November escorting a convoy of LSTs to Coco Solo, Panama Canal Zone, arriving there on 22 November. She sailed on 5 December escorting the repair ship Luzon (ARG-2) to Funafuti, then continued on to the New Hebrides on convoy escort duty. Escort runs from Funafuti continued until 1 May, when she sailed for the Solomon Islands, arriving at Florida Island on 6 May. She operated on patrol and escort duties in the Solomons, occasionally sailing to islands to the south, until departing for Ulithi, where she arrived on 14 December.

Between December 1944 and July 1945, PC-1138 provided essential escort for ship movements related to the Iwo Jima and Okinawa campaigns, sailing from Ulithi to the Palaus, Eniwetok, and Guam. She arrived at Pearl Harbor on 5 August, and operated out of there until sailing for the west coast on 20 May 1946.

After calling in San Francisco, California, she reached Astoria, Oregon, on 21 June, and was decommissioned there on 13 September 1946. While berthed in reserve in the Columbia River, she was named Lapeer on 1 February 1956, after Lapeer, Michigan. Her name was struck from the Naval Vessel Register on 1 April 1959, and she was subsequently sold.
