= BAP Antofagasta =

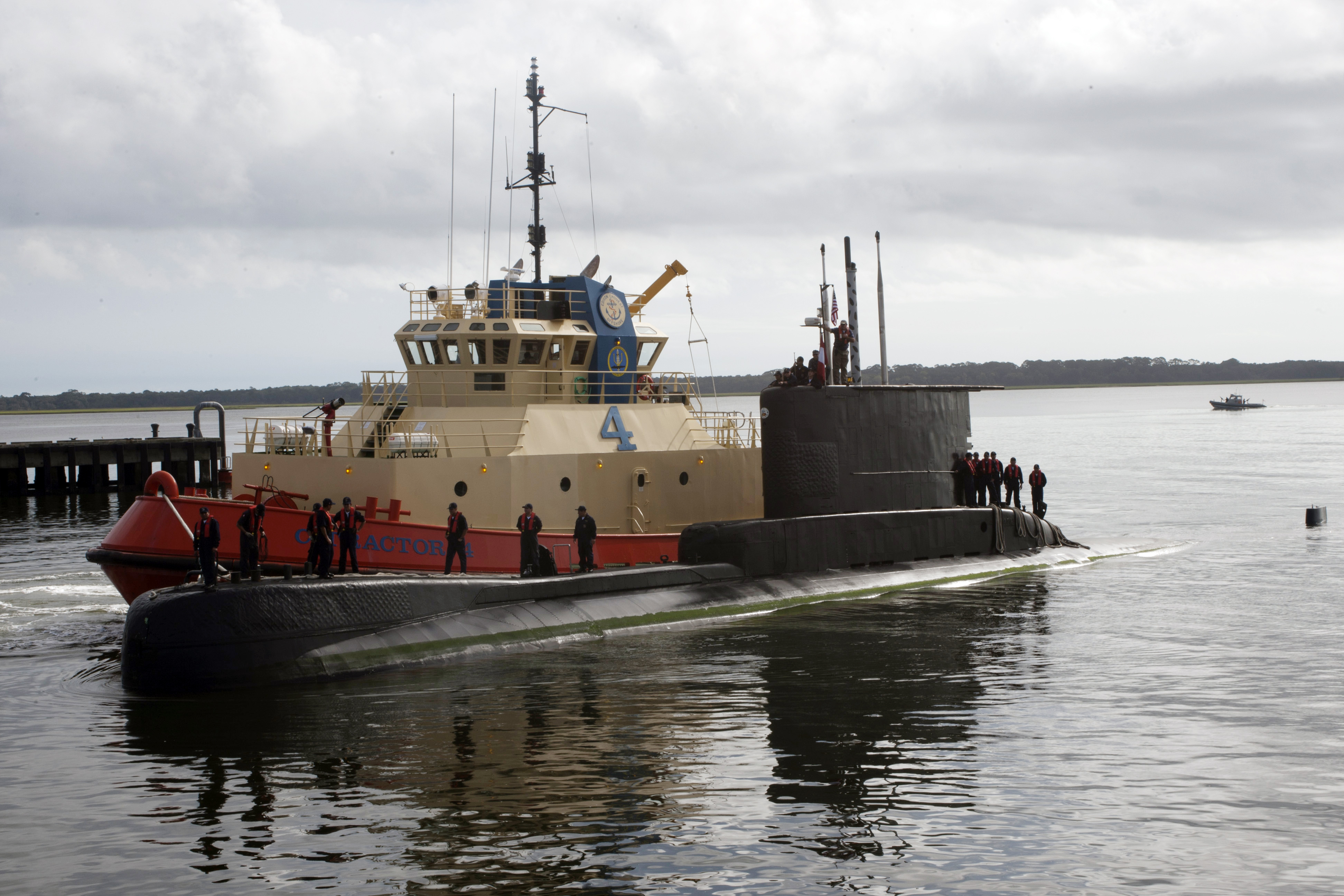
- BAP Antofagasta during a port visit to Naval Submarine Base Kings Bay in the United States in 2011

History

Peru
- Name: BAP Antofagasta
- Ordered: 12 August 1976
- Builder: Howaldtswerke Deutsche Werft AG
- Laid down: 3 December 1977
- Launched: 19 December 1979
- Commissioned: 22 May 1981
- Home port: Callao
- Identification: SS-32
- Motto: Nuestro orgullo es su vergüenza

General characteristics
- Class & type: Type 209/1200 submarine
- Displacement: 1,180 t surfaced; 1,285 t submerged
- Length: 55.9 m (183 ft)
- Beam: 6.4 m (21 ft)
- Draught: 5.9 m (19 ft)
- Propulsion: 4 MTU Type 12V493 AZ80 GA31L diesel engines; 1 Siemens electric motor; 1 shaft; 4,600 hp (3,400 kW)
- Speed: 11 kn (20 km/h) surfaced; 21 kn (39 km/h) submerged
- Range: 11,300 nmi (20,900 km; 13,000 mi) surfaced at 4 kn (7.4 km/h)
- Endurance: 40 days on patrol
- Complement: 5 officers, 26 enlisted
- Armament: 8 × 21 in (533 mm) torpedo tubes; 14 SST-4 torpedoes

BAP Antofagasta is one of two Type 209/1200 submarines ordered by the Peruvian Navy on 12 August 1976. She was built by the German shipbuilder Howaldtswerke Deutsche Werft AG at its shipyard in Kiel. She is named after the Naval Battle of Antofagasta during the War of the Pacific. Following sea trials in the North Sea, she arrived at its homeport of Callao in 1981. After several years in service she was overhauled by Servicio Industrial de la Marina (SIMA) at Callao in 1996.

== Sources ==
- Baker III, Arthur D., The Naval Institute Guide to Combat Fleets of the World 2002-2003. Naval Institute Press, 2002.
- Ortiz Sotelo, Jorge, Apuntes para la historia de los submarinos peruanos. Biblioteca Nacional, 2001.
- Scheina, Robert L. & Smigelski, Adam (1995). "Peru". In Chumbley, Stephen (ed.). Conway's All the World's Fighting Ships, 1947–1995 (revised ed.). Naval Institute Press. pp. 303–307. ISBN 1-55750-132-7.
