= ARV Almirante García =

Mariscal Sucre-class frigate

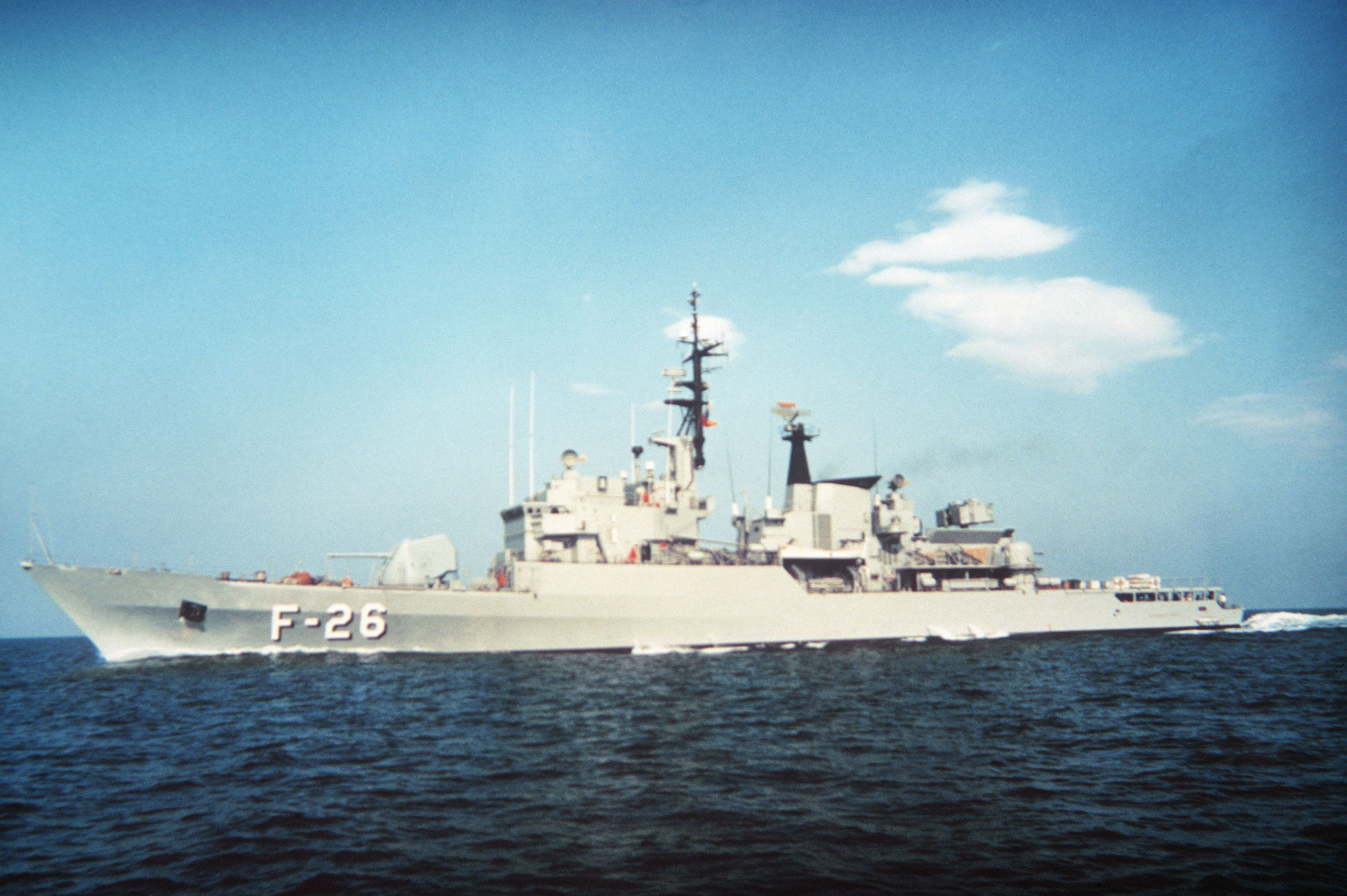
- ARV Almirante García on 1 August 1982

History

Venezuela
- Name: Almirante García
- Namesake: Almirante García
- Ordered: 1975
- Builder: Cantieri Riuniti dell'Adriatico, Riva Trigoso
- Laid down: 21 August 1979
- Launched: 4 October 1980
- Commissioned: 30 July 1982
- Renamed: from José Felix Ribas
- Home port: Puerto Cabello
- Identification: Pennant number: F-26
- Motto: Vinces Ad Patria
- Status: Decommissioned

General characteristics
- Class & type: Mariscal Sucre-class frigate
- Displacement: 2.506 t (2.466 long tons) full load
- Length: 113.2 m (371 ft) LOA
- Beam: 11.3 m (37 ft)
- Draft: 3.7 m (12 ft)
- Propulsion: - CODOG scheme; - 2 x shaft; - 2 x GE / Fiat LM2500 gas turbines 50,000 shp (37,000 kW); - 2 x diesel engines Grandi Motori Trieste GMT A230-20 diesel engines 7,800 shp (5.8 MW); - 4 x diesel engine generators Grandi Motori Trieste GMT 236SS, 3,000 kW (4,000 shp)
- Speed: 35 kn (65 km/h) with gas turbines; 21 kn (39 km/h) with diesels
- Range: 4,300 nmi (8,000 km) at 16 kn (30 km/h)
- Complement: 185 (20 officers)
- Sensors & processing systems: - Selenia SADOC 2 combat management system; - 1 x Selenia SPS-774 (RAN-10S) early warning radar; - 1 x Selenia SPQ-2F CORA OTH surface search radar; - 1 x Selenia SPS-702 (or RAN-11L/X) air/surface search radar; - 1 x Selenia SPG-70 (RTN-10X) fire control radar; - 1 x Raytheon Mk 95 fire control radar; - 2 x Selenia SPG-74 (RTN-20X) fire control radar; - 1 x GEM Elettronica AN/SPN-748 navigation radar; - Raytheon DE 1160B (SQS-56) hull sonar
- Electronic warfare & decoys: - SLR-4 ESM system; - SLQ-D ECM system; - AN/SLQ-25 Nixie torpedo decoy; - 2 x Breda SCLAR decoy launchers
- Armament: - 8 x Otomat Mk 2 SSMs; - 1 x Mk.29 octuple launcher for Sea Sparrow/Aspide SAM; - 2 x Mark 32 triple torpedo tubes; - 1 x OTO Melara 127/54 mm gun; - 2 x OTO Melara Twin 40L70 DARDO compact gun
- Aircraft carried: 1 AB-212ASW helicopter
- Aviation facilities: Flight deck: 25.2 m × 11.3 m (83 ft × 37 ft); Telescopic hangar for 1 medium helicopter.

ARV Almirante García (F-25) was the sixth ship of the Mariscal Sucre-class frigate of the Venezuelan Navy.

== Development and design ==
Venezuela ordered six Lupo-class frigates from CNR in 1975 as a replacement for older warships. These units were commissioned between 1980 and 1982. In general terms, their appearance and equipment is similar to those built for Peru, except for some differences in electronics and missiles. The first two ships, ARV Mariscal Sucre (F-21) and ARV Almirante Brión (F-22) were upgraded by Ingalls Shipbuilding over a four years period (1998–2002). The other ships in Venezuelan service were expected to undergo an austere version of this upgrade, but three ships were eventually taken out of service.

== Construction and career ==
Almirante García was laid down on 21 August 1979 and launched on 4 October 1980 by Cantieri Riuniti dell'Adriatico at Riva Trigoso. She was commissioned on 30 July 1982.

Over the years she has participated in multiple important naval exercises and has been the flagship of the multinational UNITAS exercise.

With the change of name of the Venezuelan naval force, the unit prefix changed from ARV (Armada de la República de Venezuela) to AB (Armada Bolivariana).

== Gallery ==
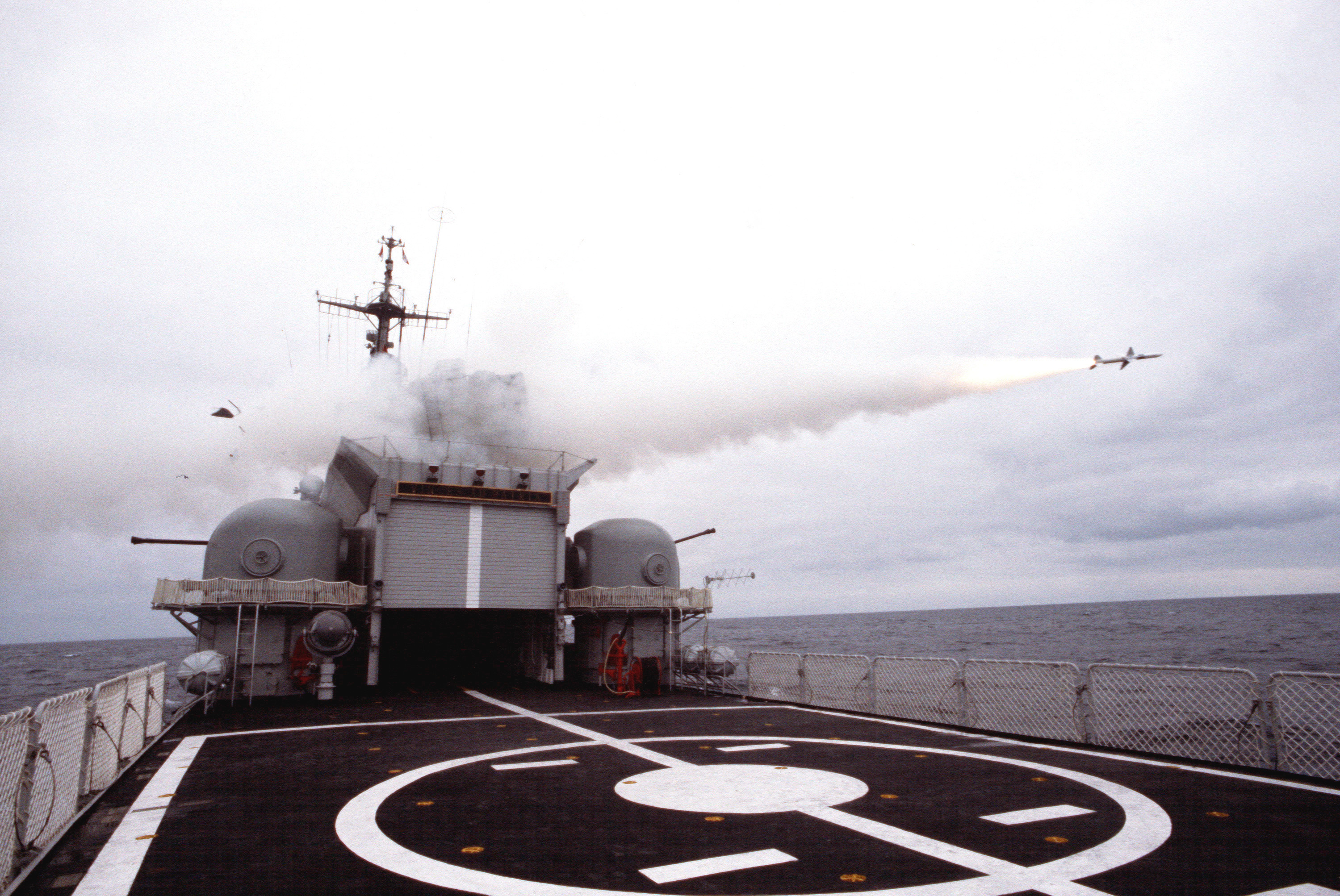
ARV Almirante García fires an Aspide missile on 1 June 1984.

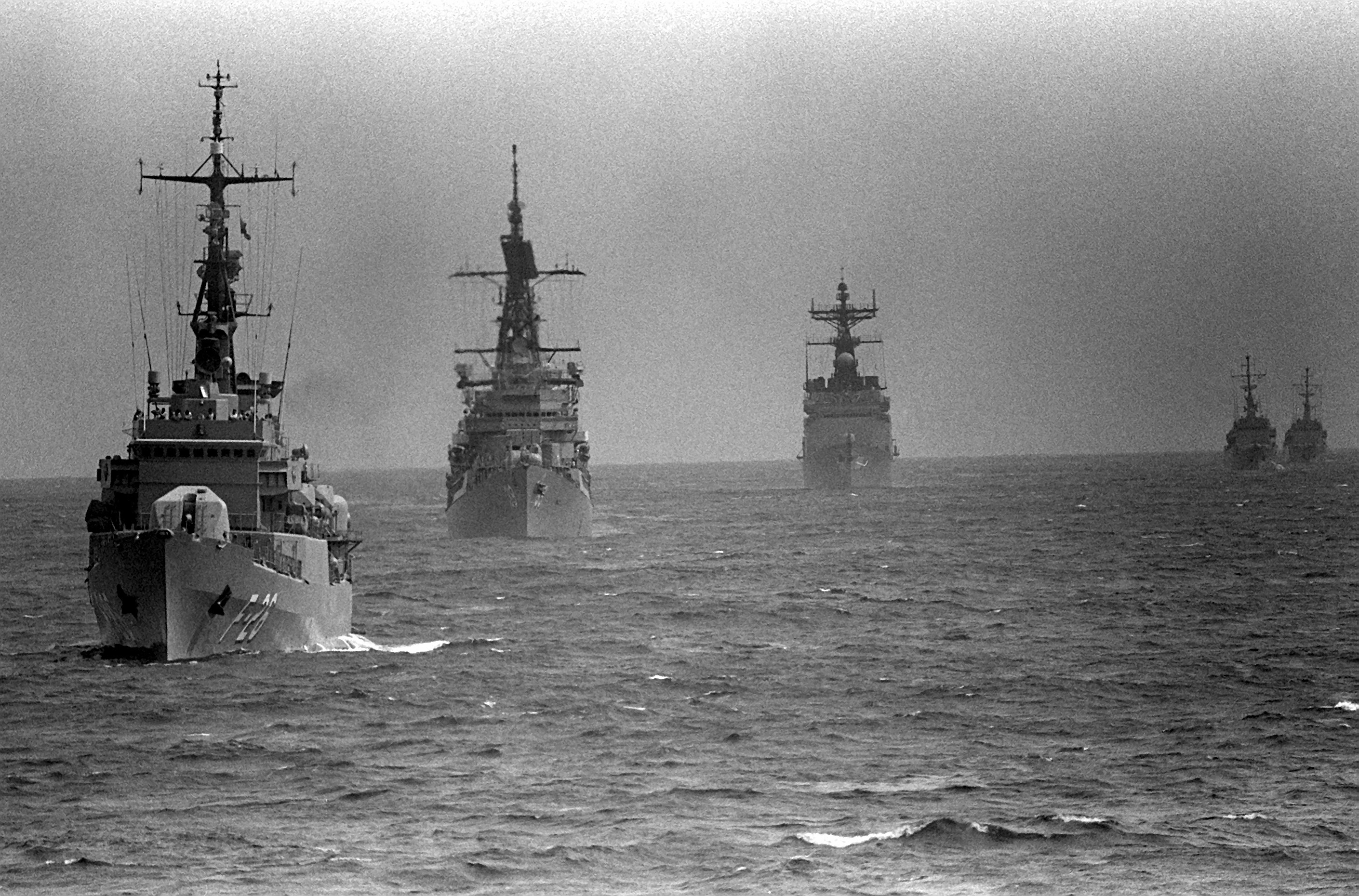
ARV Almirante García, USS MacDonough and USS Thorn on 3 July 1984.

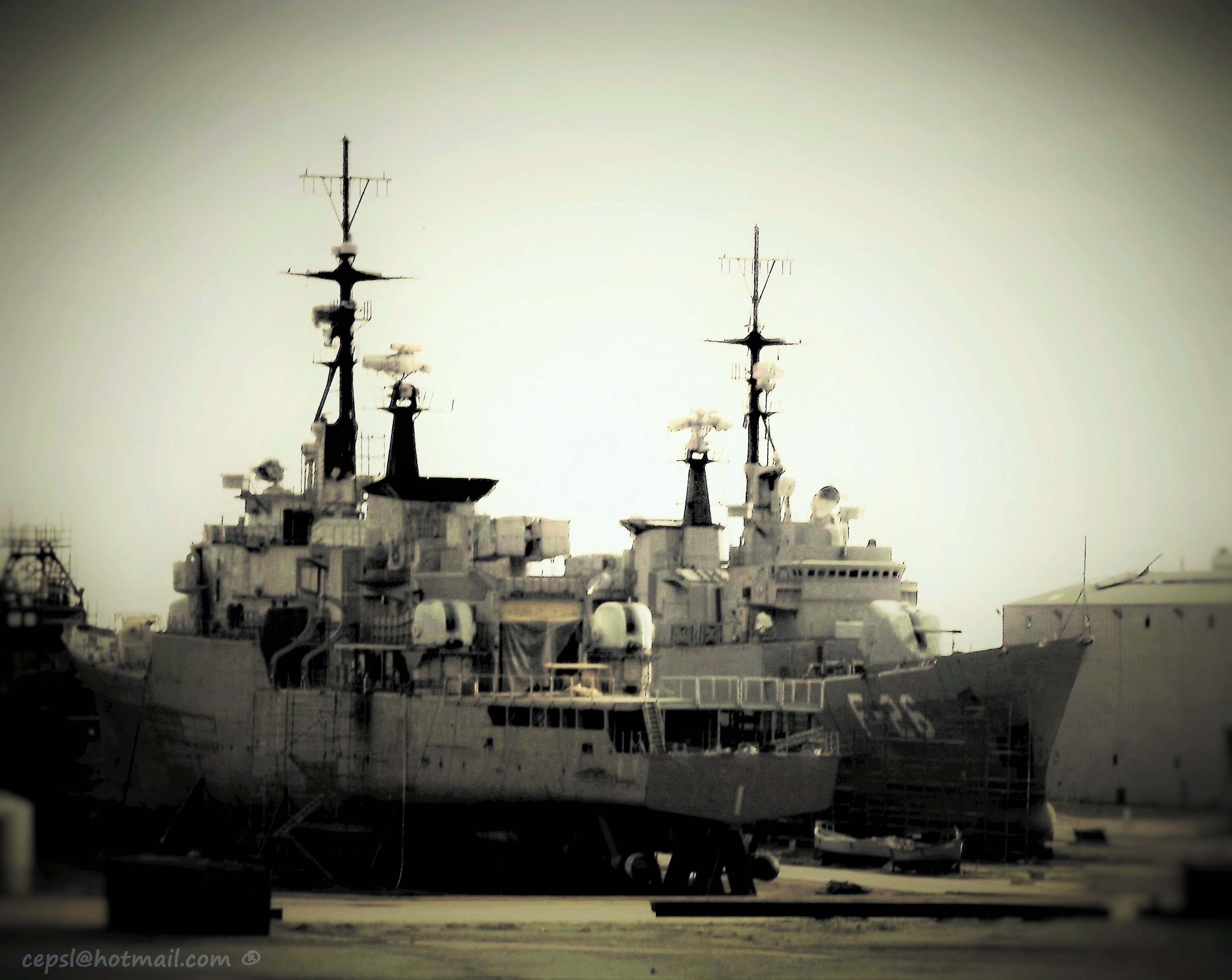
ARV Almirante García and ARV General Salóm in dry dock repair on 24 July 2012.

== Bibliography ==
- Scheina, Robert L. & Smigielski, Adam (1995). "Venezuela". In Chumbley, Stephen (ed.). Conway's All the World's Fighting Ships, 1947–1995 (revised ed.). Naval Institute Press. pp. 635–637. ISBN 1-55750-132-7.
