= F24 =

F24 may refer to:

== Vehicle ==
Aircraft

- Douglas A-24, an American carrier-based aircraft
- Fairchild 24, an American high-wing aircraft
- Fokker F.XXIV, a Dutch passenger airliner
- Supermarine Spitfire F.24, a British aircraft

Ships and boats

- ARV General Soublette (F-24), a Mariscal Sucre-class frigate of the Venezuelan Navy
- Farrier F-24, an American trimaran boat
- KD Rahmat, a frigate of the Royal Malaysian Navy
- HMS Maori (F24), a Tribal-class destroyer of the Royal Navy

== Other uses ==
- F24 camera, a British aerial reconnaissance camera
- Fluorine-24 (^{24}F), an isotope of fluorine
- France 24, an international news and current affairs television channel
