= ARV General Salóm =

Mariscal Sucre-class frigate

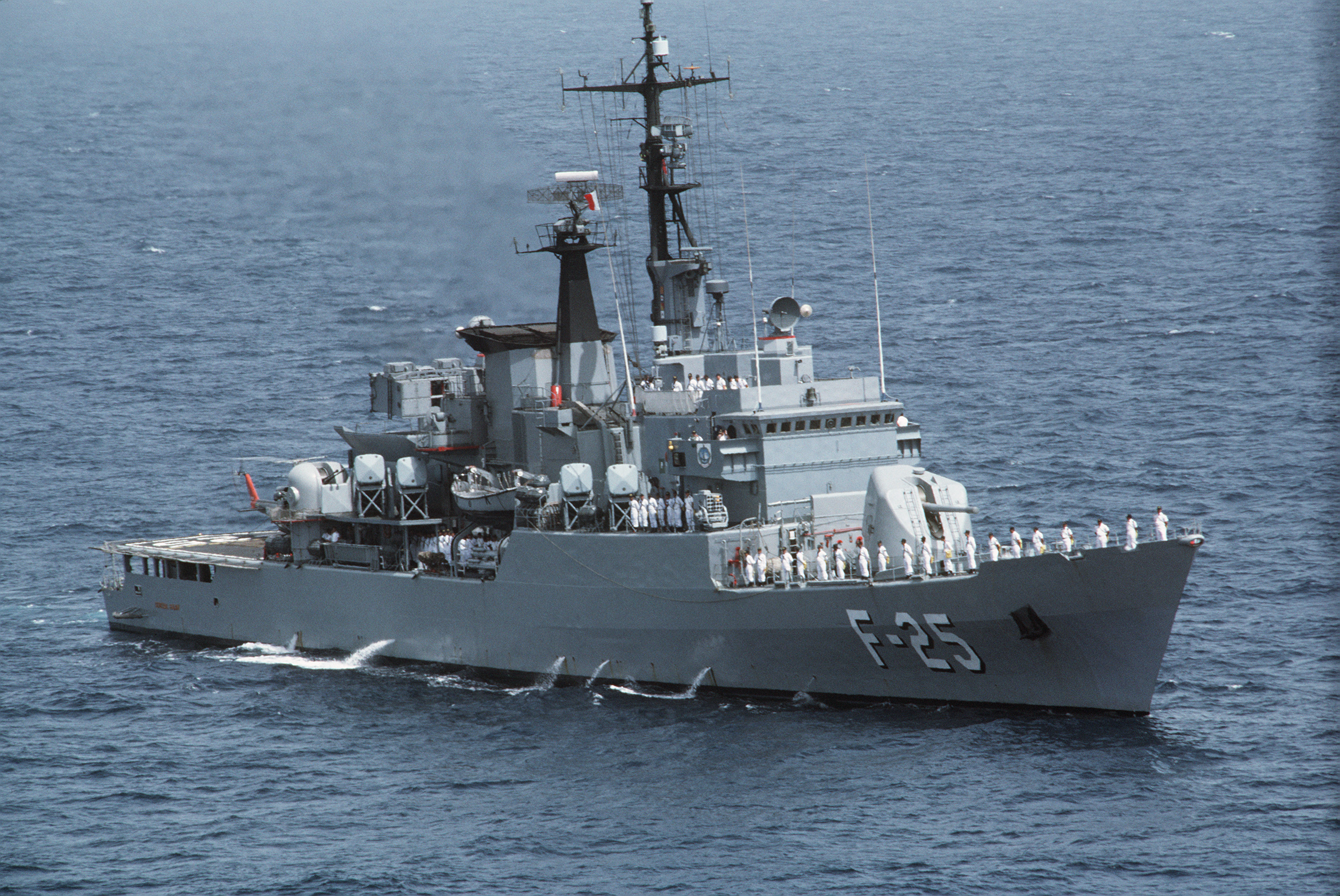
- ARV General Salóm on 12 July 1987

History

Venezuela
- Name: General Salóm
- Namesake: General Salóm
- Ordered: 1975
- Builder: Cantieri Riuniti dell'Adriatico, Ancona
- Laid down: 7 November 1978
- Launched: 13 January 1980
- Commissioned: 3 April 1982
- Home port: Puerto Cabello
- Identification: Pennant number: F-25
- Motto: No rendirse jamas; (Do not ever give up)
- Status: Decommissioned

General characteristics
- Class & type: Mariscal Sucre-class frigate
- Displacement: 2.506 t (2.466 long tons) full load
- Length: 113.2 m (371 ft) LOA
- Beam: 11.3 m (37 ft)
- Draft: 3.7 m (12 ft)
- Propulsion: - CODOG scheme; - 2 x shaft; - 2 x GE / Fiat LM2500 gas turbines 50,000 shp (37,000 kW); - 2 x diesel engines Grandi Motori Trieste GMT A230-20 diesel engines 7,800 shp (5.8 MW); - 4 x diesel engine generators Grandi Motori Trieste GMT 236SS, 3,000 kW (4,000 shp)
- Speed: 35 kn (65 km/h) with gas turbines; 21 kn (39 km/h) with diesels
- Range: 4,300 nmi (8,000 km) at 16 kn (30 km/h)
- Complement: 185 (20 officers)
- Sensors & processing systems: - Selenia SADOC 2 combat management system; - 1 x Selenia SPS-774 (RAN-10S) early warning radar; - 1 x Selenia SPQ-2F CORA OTH surface search radar; - 1 x Selenia SPS-702 (or RAN-11L/X) air/surface search radar; - 1 x Selenia SPG-70 (RTN-10X) fire control radar; - 1 x Raytheon Mk 95 fire control radar; - 2 x Selenia SPG-74 (RTN-20X) fire control radar; - 1 x GEM Elettronica AN/SPN-748 navigation radar; - Raytheon DE 1160B (SQS-56) hull sonar
- Electronic warfare & decoys: - SLR-4 ESM system; - SLQ-D ECM system; - AN/SLQ-25 Nixie torpedo decoy; - 2 x Breda SCLAR decoy launchers
- Armament: - 8 x Otomat Mk 2 SSMs; - 1 x Mk.29 octuple launcher for Sea Sparrow/Aspide SAM; - 2 x Mark 32 triple torpedo tubes; - 1 x OTO Melara 127/54 mm gun; - 2 x OTO Melara Twin 40L70 DARDO compact gun
- Aircraft carried: 1 AB-212ASW helicopter
- Aviation facilities: Flight deck: 25.2 m × 11.3 m (83 ft × 37 ft); Telescopic hangar for 1 medium helicopter.

ARV General Salóm (F-25) was the fifth ship of the Mariscal Sucre-class frigate of the Venezuelan Navy.

== Development and design ==
Venezuela ordered six Lupo-class frigates from CNR in 1975 as a replacement for older warships. These units were commissioned between 1980 and 1982. In general terms, their appearance and equipment is similar to those built for Peru, except for some differences in electronics and missiles. The first two ships, ARV Mariscal Sucre (F-21) and ARV Almirante Brión (F-22) were upgraded by Ingalls Shipbuilding over a four years period (1998–2002). The other ships in Venezuelan service were expected to undergo an austere version of this upgrade, but three ships were eventually taken out of service.

== Construction and career ==
General Salóm was laid down on 7 November 1978 and launched on 13 January 1980 by Cantieri Riuniti dell'Adriatico at Ancona. She was commissioned on 3 April 1982.

On 21 July 1987, she came alongside USS Dwight D. Eisenhower near Caracas, in the Mediterranean Sea.

Over the years she has participated in multiple important naval exercises and has been the flagship of the multinational UNITAS exercise.

With the change of name of the Venezuelan naval force, the unit prefix changed from ARV (Armada de la República de Venezuela) to AB (Armada Bolivariana).

== Gallery ==
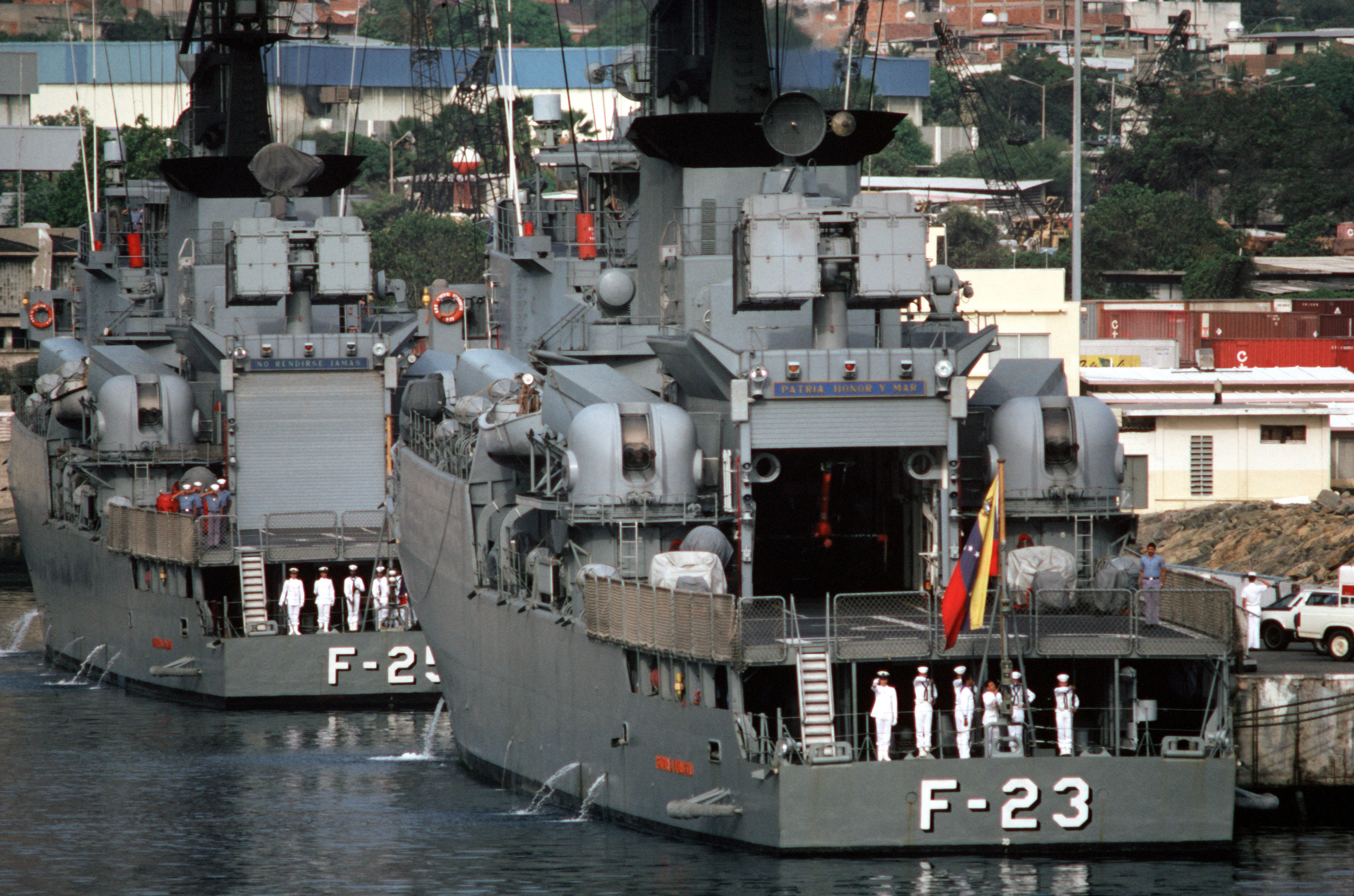
ARV General Salóm and ARV General Urdaneta on 1 June 1984.

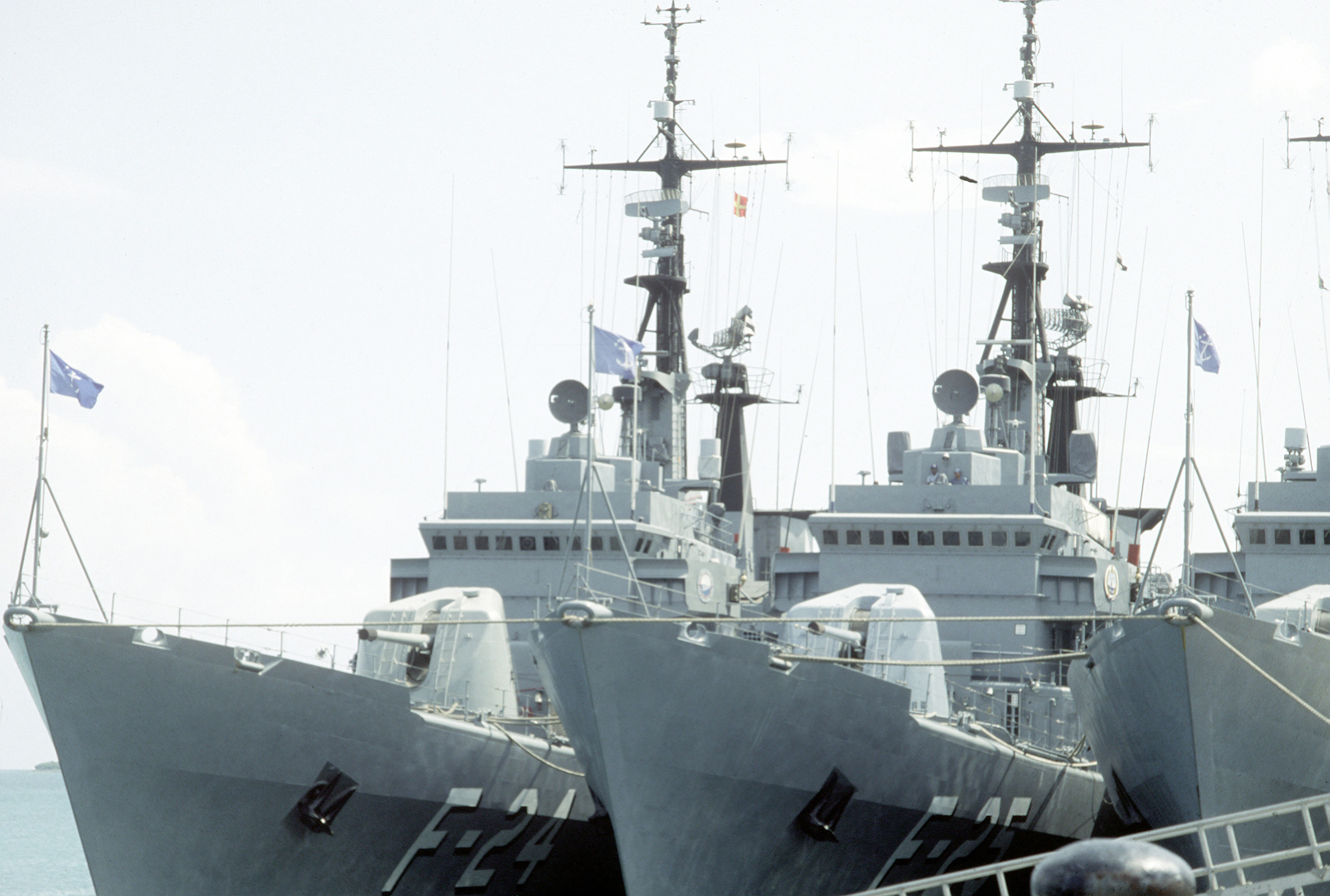
ARV General Salóm and ARV General Soublette on 1 January 1986.

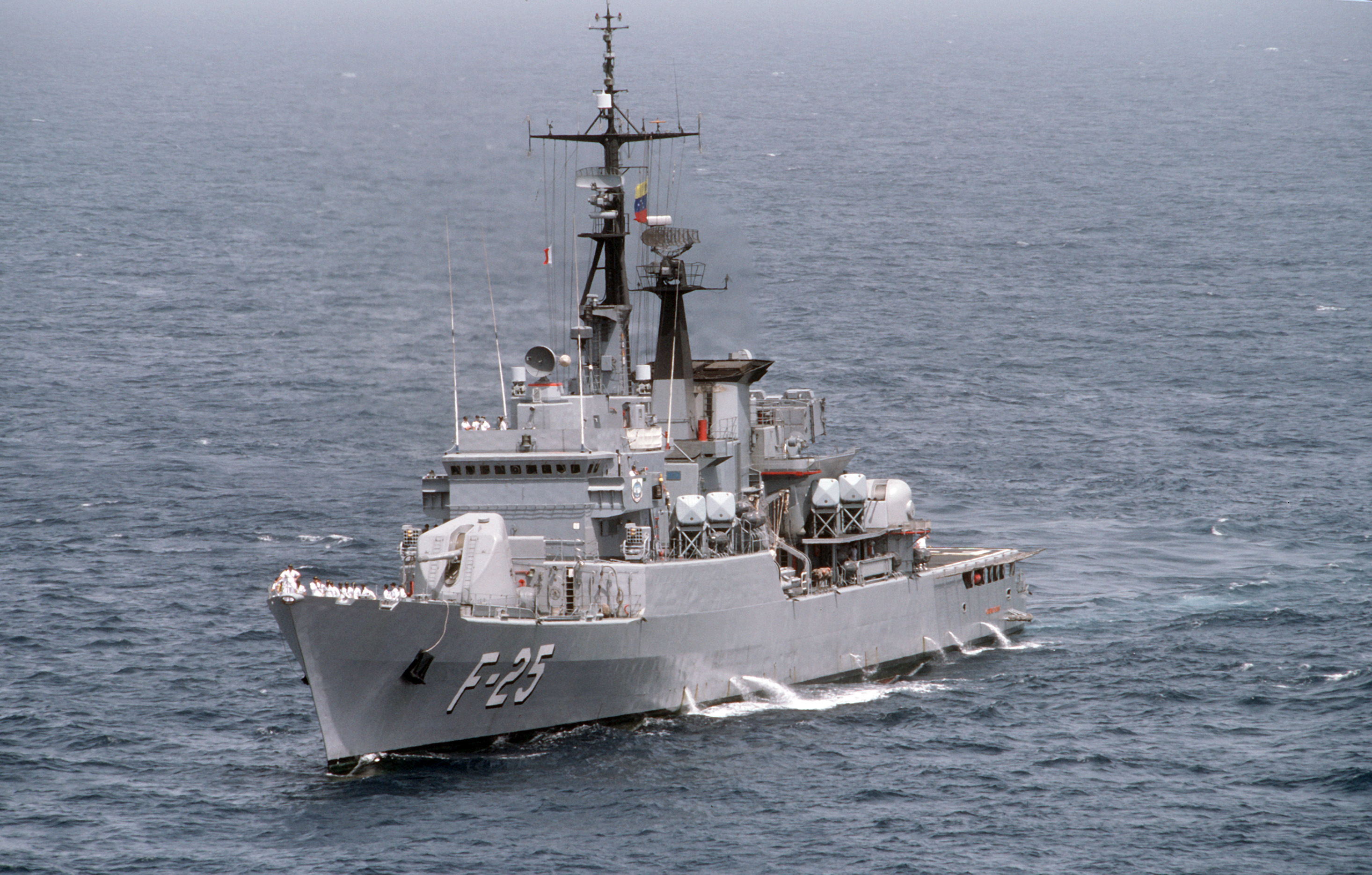
ARV General Salóm on 12 July 1987.

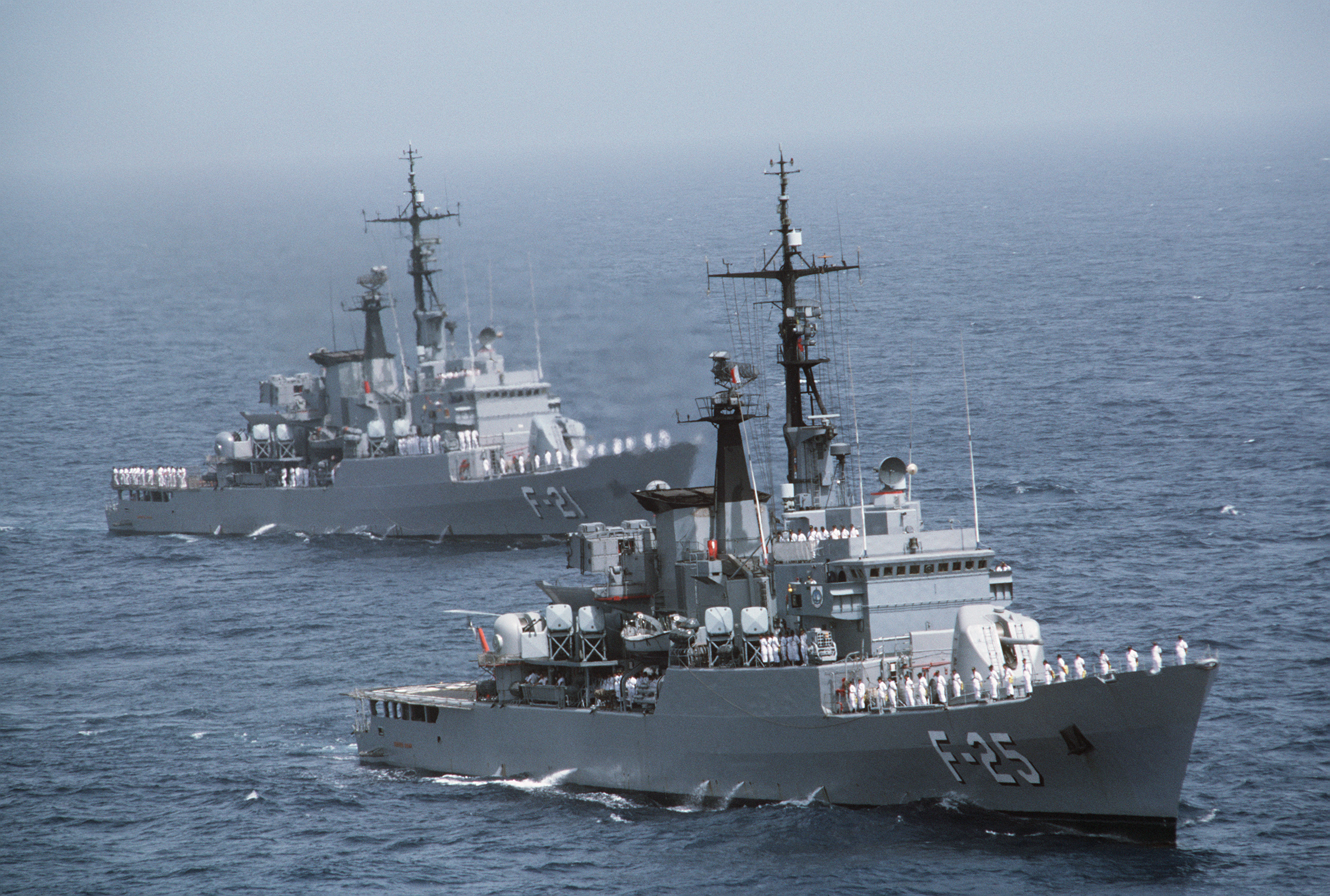
ARV General Salóm and ARV Mariscal Sucre on 12 July 1987.

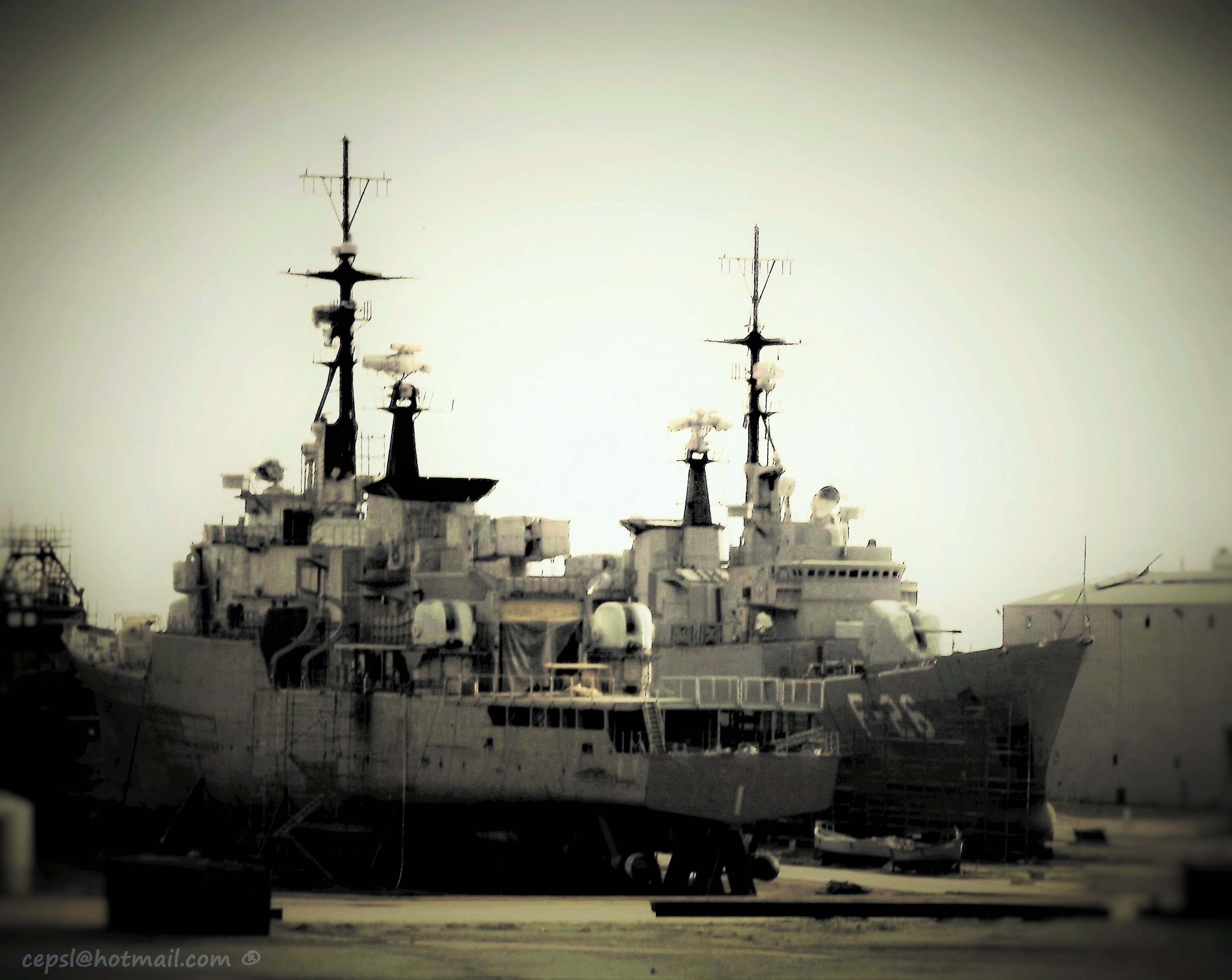
ARV General Salóm in dry dock repair on 24 July 2012.

== Bibliography ==
- Scheina, Robert L. & Smigielski, Adam (1995). "Venezuela". In Chumbley, Stephen (ed.). Conway's All the World's Fighting Ships, 1947–1995 (revised ed.). Naval Institute Press. pp. 635–637. ISBN 1-55750-132-7.
