= Fokker F.XXIV =

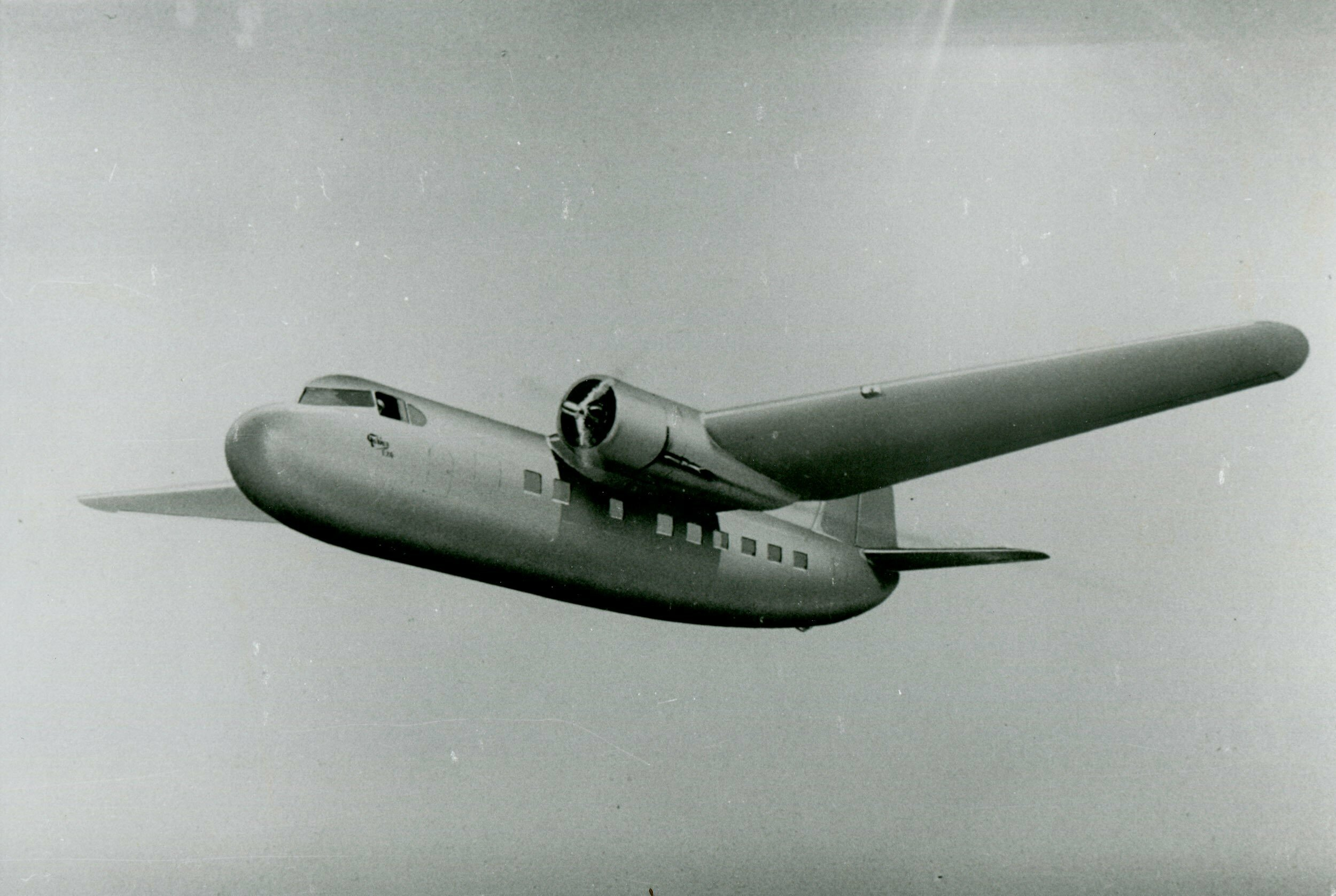
- Concept art of the F.XXIV in 1939

General information
- Type: Airliner
- Manufacturer: Fokker

The Fokker F.XXIV was a 1939 passenger airliner design by the Dutch aircraft manufacturer Fokker. It was Fokker's first all-metal airliner design.

== History ==
Due to the success of the Douglas DC-3, Fokker's role in the global market for passenger aircraft was severely diminished. Whereas KLM was historically an important customer to Fokker, even they turned to other suppliers. When in 1938 KLM ordered the Douglas DC-5 in the US and showed interest in the Douglas DC-4E, Fokker realized it had to come to terms with the new era.

The F24's origins began with Model 175, a T.IX derivative that used the T.IX's wing (although in a high-wing configuration), engines and tail, but with a fuselage for 18 passengers. This was ultimately deemed too small, and Fokker proposed Model 193 for 24 passengers, which would eventually become the F24.

Whereas KLM was state-owned, Fokker used its political influence to force a sale from KLM. Finally in October 1939, KLM ordered four F.XXIVs. This sale was part of a broader package which also included the Douglas DC-4E, the Lockheed Excalibur and another Fokker design known as Model 180.

The F24 as it was proposed, was a short-range all-metal twin-engine passenger aircraft. It was supposed to be powered by two 1,600 hp (1,200 kW) Wright R-2600 Twin Cyclone radial engines. Its fuselage was designed for 26 passengers. The single aisle cabin layout had eight rows of two abreast on the right and eight rows of a single seat on the left. A cargo hold was put between the passenger cabin and the cockpit. This cockpit had a layout for a crew of four. Two smaller cargo holds were planned for the wing center section. In the middle of the passenger cabin was a galley. At the aft side of the cabin was a toilet with another cargo bay. The underside of the fuselage was reinforced to protect the passengers in case of a wheels-up landing.

However the project never materialized as World War II broke out. During the war, design work was continued, but on a limited scale as it was hoped to deliver the F24 after WWII. After the war, Plesman needed aircraft immediately and bought them from American surplus military stock. Talks between KLM and Fokker on the F24 continued until 1946. Because the Fokker factory had been destroyed during WWII and needed to be rebuilt, Fokker had great difficulty in quoting prices and delivery times. KLM ordered Convair 240s instead, and development on the F24 was halted.

== Specifications ==
General characteristics

- Crew: 3
- Capacity: 24 passengers
- Length: 20.7 m (67 ft 11 in)
- Wingspan: 28.5 m (93 ft 6 in)
- Height: 5.2 m (17 ft 1 in)
- Empty weight: 8,500 kg (18,739 lb)
- Max takeoff weight: 13,250 kg (29,211 lb)
- Powerplant: 2 × Wright Cyclone 9-cyl. air-cooled radial piston engines, 1,193 kW (1,600 hp) each

Performance

- Cruise speed: 330 km/h (210 mph, 180 kn)
- Range: 1,200 km (750 mi, 650 nmi)

== See also ==
- Fokker F27
- Convair 240
