= ARV Almirante Brión =

Mariscal Sucre-class frigate

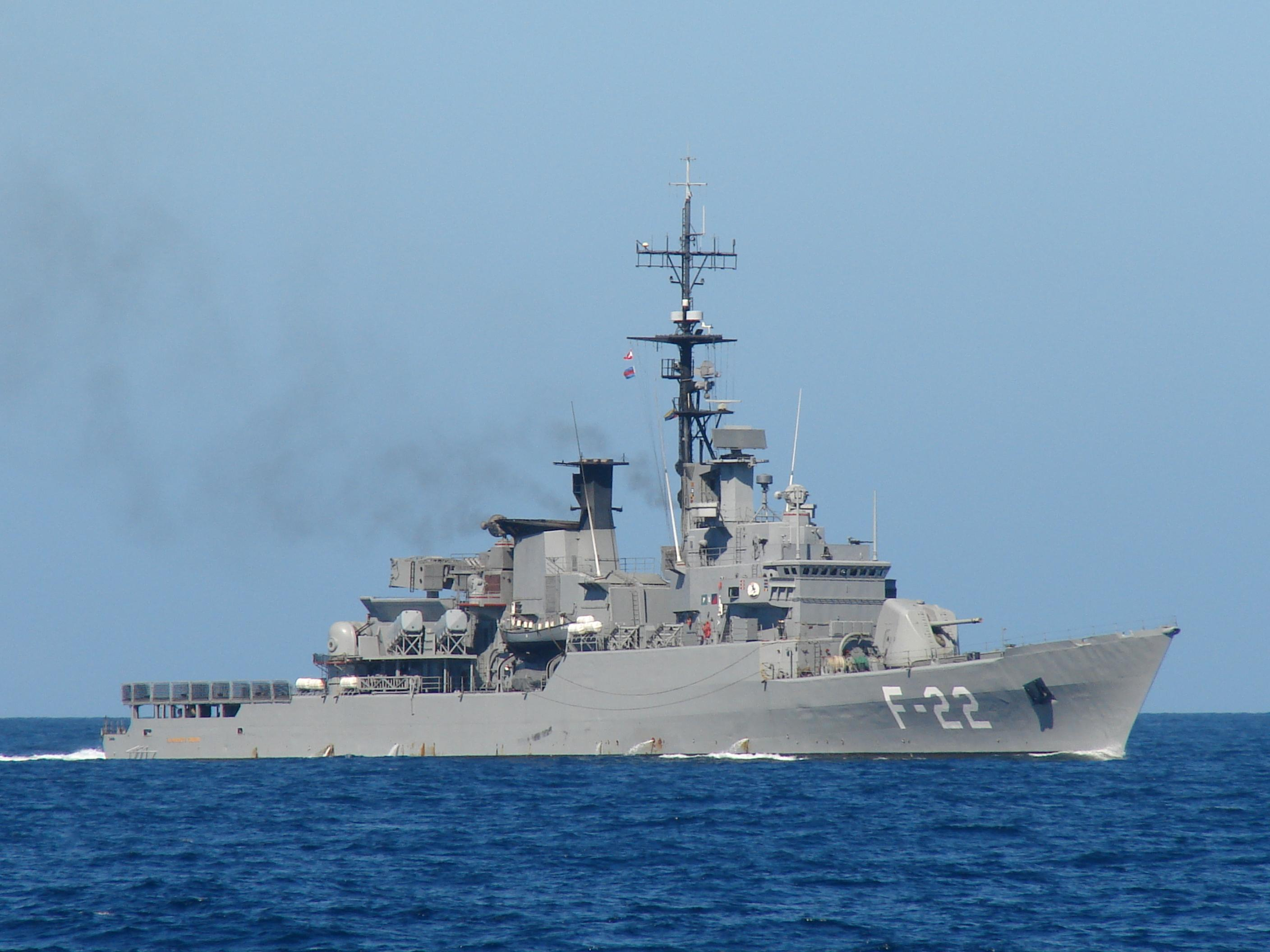
- ARV Almirante Brión on 6 May 2010

History

Venezuela
- Name: Almirante Brión
- Namesake: Almirante Brión
- Ordered: 1975
- Builder: Cantieri Navali del Tirreno e Riuniti, Riva Trigoso
- Laid down: June 1977
- Launched: 22 February 1979
- Commissioned: 7 March 1981
- Home port: Puerto Cabello
- Identification: Pennant number: F-22
- Motto: Constancia y valor; (Constancy and courage)
- Status: Active

General characteristics
- Class & type: Mariscal Sucre-class frigate
- Displacement: 2.506 t (2.466 long tons) full load
- Length: 113.2 m (371 ft) LOA
- Beam: 11.3 m (37 ft)
- Draft: 3.7 m (12 ft)
- Propulsion: - CODOG scheme; - 2 x shaft; - 2 x GE / Fiat LM2500 gas turbines 50,000 shp (37,000 kW); - 2 x diesel engines Grandi Motori Trieste GMT A230-20 diesel engines 7,800 shp (5.8 MW); - 4 x diesel engine generators Grandi Motori Trieste GMT 236SS, 3,000 kW (4,000 shp)
- Speed: 35 kn (65 km/h) with gas turbines; 21 kn (39 km/h) with diesels
- Range: 4,300 nmi (8,000 km) at 16 kn (30 km/h)
- Complement: 185 (20 officers)
- Sensors & processing systems: - Selenia SADOC 2 combat management system; - 1 x Selenia SPS-774 (RAN-10S) early warning radar; - 1 x Selenia SPQ-2F CORA OTH surface search radar; - 1 x Selenia SPS-702 (or RAN-11L/X) air/surface search radar; - 1 x Selenia SPG-70 (RTN-10X) fire control radar; - 1 x Raytheon Mk 95 fire control radar; - 2 x Selenia SPG-74 (RTN-20X) fire control radar; - 1 x GEM Elettronica AN/SPN-748 navigation radar; - Raytheon DE 1160B (SQS-56) hull sonar
- Electronic warfare & decoys: - SLR-4 ESM system; - SLQ-D ECM system; - AN/SLQ-25 Nixie torpedo decoy; - 2 x Breda SCLAR decoy launchers
- Armament: - 8 x Otomat Mk 2 SSMs; - 1 x Mk.29 octuple launcher for Sea Sparrow/Aspide SAM; - 2 x Mark 32 triple torpedo tubes; - 1 x OTO Melara 127/54 mm gun; - 2 x OTO Melara Twin 40L70 DARDO compact gun
- Aircraft carried: 1 AB-212ASW helicopter
- Aviation facilities: Flight deck: 25.2 m × 11.3 m (83 ft × 37 ft); Telescopic hangar for 1 medium helicopter.

ARV Almirante Brión (F-22) is the second ship of the Mariscal Sucre-class frigate of the Venezuelan Navy.

== Development and design ==
Venezuela ordered six Lupo-class frigates from CNR in 1975 as a replacement for older warships. These units were commissioned between 1980 and 1982. In general terms, their appearance and equipment is similar to those built for Peru, except for some differences in electronics and missiles. The first two ships, ARV Mariscal Sucre (F-21) and ARV Almirante Brión (F-22) were upgraded by Ingalls Shipbuilding over a four years period (1998–2002). The other ships in Venezuelan service were expected to undergo an austere version of this upgrade, but three ships were eventually taken out of service.

== Construction and career ==
Almirante Brión was laid down in June 1977 and launched on 22 February 1979 by Cantieri Riuniti dell'Adriatico at Riva Trigoso. She was commissioned on 7 March 1981.

Over the years she has participated in multiple important naval exercises and has been the flagship of the multinational UNITAS exercise.

In 1987, together with other units of the Venezuelan navy, she participated in the confrontation with Colombia which almost resulted in an armed conflict, known in Colombia as the ARC Caldas corvette crisis, in which a dispute relating to the territorial waters of the Gulf of Maracaibo naval forces in the area, and a significant deployment of military means at the border of the two countries.

Between 1998 and 2002, together with her sister ARV Mariscal Sucre, she underwent modernization works at the Ingalls Shipbuilding plants in Pascagoula in Mississippi. The changes involved the total overhaul of the hull, the replacement of the diesel propulsion engines, the modernization of the gas turbines, the replacement of the powertrain control system, the replacement of the generators, a new navigation radar, new sonar. to hull, new electronic systems that have modernized the command and control system, significantly improving the level of automation and allowing the crew to be reduced from 185 to 131 men. The unit was equipped with MTU 20V 1163 diesel engines, the new Elta EL / M-2238 Star 3D surveillance and air search radar, the ESM / ECM Elisra NS 9003/9005 system and of the Elbit ENTCS 2000 system for shooting control. The SCLAR launchers have been replaced by 130mm Mk 137 launchers, as well as the sonar which in the new configuration is the Northrop Grumman SQS-53C hull mounted. The ships are equipped with the Sperry marine MK 39 navigation system and the SHINCOM 2100 integrated communication system from DRS Technologies.

With the change of name of the Venezuelan naval force, the unit prefix changed from ARV (Armada de la República de Venezuela) to AB (Armada Bolivariana).

== Gallery ==
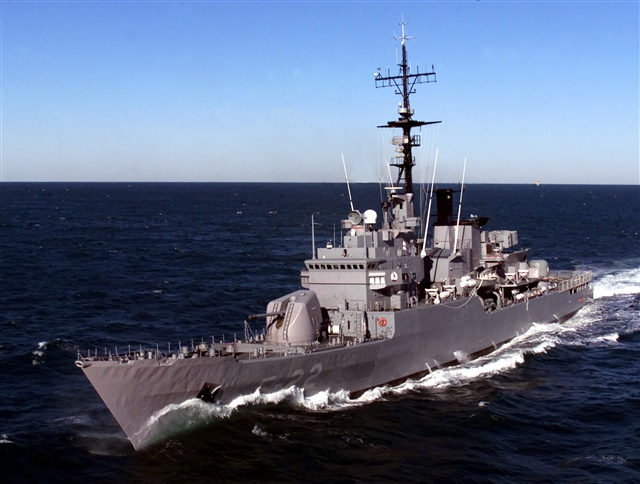
ARV Almirante Briòn on 28 January 2007.

== Bibliography ==
- Scheina, Robert L. & Smigielski, Adam (1995). "Venezuela". In Chumbley, Stephen (ed.). Conway's All the World's Fighting Ships, 1947–1995 (revised ed.). Naval Institute Press. pp. 635–637. ISBN 1-55750-132-7.
