= UNITAS =

Multi-lateral naval exercise in the Americas

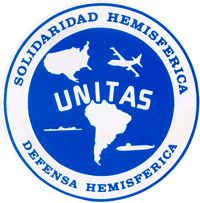
UNITAS emblem

UNITAS are sea exercises and in-port training involving several countries in North, South and Central America, conducted by the United States since 1959 in support of U.S. policy.

In 2009, the exercises were named UNITAS Gold, in recognition of the fiftieth anniversary of the first exercises in 1959.

== See also ==
- Foreign policy of the United States
- Military of the United States
