= List of active Italian Navy ships =

Naval ensign of Italy

This is a list of active Italian Navy ships. The navy maintains approximately 199 ships in service, including minor auxiliary vessels. The fleet has started a process of renewal that will see 50 ships retired by 2025 and replaced by 30 multi-mission ships. Ocean going fleet units include: 2 aircraft carriers, 3 small 8,000-tonne amphibious transport docks, 2 air-defence destroyers, 9 general-purpose frigates, 6 anti-submarine frigates, and 8 attack submarines. Patrol and littoral warfare units include 9 offshore patrol vessels. In support of the fleet there are 9 mine countermeasure vessels, 8 coastal patrol boats/special forces patrol boats and various auxiliary ships. The total displacement of the Italian Navy is approximately 369,100 tonnes.

== Submarine fleet ==
Class	In service	Picture	Type	Boat	No.	Comm.	Disp.	Notes
Attack submarines (8)
Sauro class	4		Diesel-electric / AIP, attack submarines	Salvatore Pelosi	S 522	1988	1,862 tonnes	First two SSK in Class will be replaced by two U212 NFS starting in the latter 2020s and last two will be replaced by two NFS EVO in the 2030s
Sauro class	4		Diesel-electric / AIP, attack submarines	Giuliano Prini	S 523	1989	1,862 tonnes	First two SSK in Class will be replaced by two U212 NFS starting in the latter 2020s and last two will be replaced by two NFS EVO in the 2030s
Sauro class	4		Diesel-electric / AIP, attack submarines	Primo Longobardo	S 524	1993	1,862 tonnes	First two SSK in Class will be replaced by two U212 NFS starting in the latter 2020s and last two will be replaced by two NFS EVO in the 2030s
Sauro class	4		Diesel-electric / AIP, attack submarines	Gianfranco Gazzana Priaroggia	S 525	1995	1,862 tonnes	First two SSK in Class will be replaced by two U212 NFS starting in the latter 2020s and last two will be replaced by two NFS EVO in the 2030s
Todaro class Type 212A	4		Diesel-electric / AIP, attack submarines	Salvatore Todaro	S 526	2006	1,830 tonnes	Italian family of Type 212A submarine
Todaro class Type 212A	4		Diesel-electric / AIP, attack submarines	Scirè	S 527	2007	1,830 tonnes	Italian family of Type 212A submarine
Todaro class Type 212A	4		Diesel-electric / AIP, attack submarines	Pietro Venuti	S 528	2016	1,830 tonnes	Italian family of Type 212A submarine
Todaro class Type 212A	4		Diesel-electric / AIP, attack submarines	Romeo Romei	S 529	2017	1,830 tonnes	Italian family of Type 212A submarine

== Surface warship fleet ==
Class	In service	Picture	Type	Ship	No.	Comm.	Disp.	Notes
Aircraft carriers / LHD (2)
Cavour class	1		Aircraft carrier (V/STOL)	Cavour	550	2008	30,000 tonnes	
Trieste class	1		LHD / amphibious assault	Trieste	L9890	2024	38,000 tonnes	Successor of the Italian aircraft carrier Giuseppe Garibaldi.
Amphibious warfare ships (3)
San Giorgio class	3		LPD	San Giorgio	L 9892	1988	8,000 tonnes	This class will be replaced by a new class of 16,500-ton LPD planned for 2028-30.
San Giorgio class	3		LPD	San Marco	L 9893	1988	8,000 tonnes	This class will be replaced by a new class of 16,500-ton LPD planned for 2028-30.
San Giorgio class	3		LPD	San Giusto	L 9894	1994	8,000 tonnes	This class will be replaced by a new class of 16,500-ton LPD planned for 2028-30.
Destroyers (2)
Orizzonte class	2		Air-defence destroyer	Andrea Doria	D 553	2007	7,050 tonnes	MLU ongoing, and be ready by the end of 2027 / mid-2029.
Orizzonte class	2		Air-defence destroyer	Caio Duilio	D 554	2009	7,050 tonnes	MLU ongoing, and be ready by the end of 2027 / mid-2029.
Frigates (15)
Bergamini class	4		General-purpose frigate (FREMM IT-GP)	Carlo Bergamini	F 590	2013	6,700 tonnes	10 FREMM are in service. 2 ships will be transferred to the Hellenic Navy: 2028, the Carlo Bergamini (F 590); 2029, the Virginio Fasan (F 591); They will be replaced by two FREMM Evo (contract in 2024).
Bergamini class	4		General-purpose frigate (FREMM IT-GP)	Luigi Rizzo	F 595	2017	6,700 tonnes	10 FREMM are in service. 2 ships will be transferred to the Hellenic Navy: 2028, the Carlo Bergamini (F 590); 2029, the Virginio Fasan (F 591); They will be replaced by two FREMM Evo (contract in 2024).
Bergamini class	4		General-purpose frigate (FREMM IT-GP)	Federico Martinengo	F 596	2018	6,700 tonnes	10 FREMM are in service. 2 ships will be transferred to the Hellenic Navy: 2028, the Carlo Bergamini (F 590); 2029, the Virginio Fasan (F 591); They will be replaced by two FREMM Evo (contract in 2024).
Bergamini class	4		General-purpose frigate (FREMM IT-GP)	Antonio Marceglia	F 597	2019	6,700 tonnes	10 FREMM are in service. 2 ships will be transferred to the Hellenic Navy: 2028, the Carlo Bergamini (F 590); 2029, the Virginio Fasan (F 591); They will be replaced by two FREMM Evo (contract in 2024).
Bergamini class	4		ASW frigate (FREMM IT-ASW)	Virginio Fasan	F 591	2013	6,700 tonnes	10 FREMM are in service. 2 ships will be transferred to the Hellenic Navy: 2028, the Carlo Bergamini (F 590); 2029, the Virginio Fasan (F 591); They will be replaced by two FREMM Evo (contract in 2024).
Bergamini class	4		ASW frigate (FREMM IT-ASW)	Carlo Margottini	F 592	2014	6,700 tonnes	10 FREMM are in service. 2 ships will be transferred to the Hellenic Navy: 2028, the Carlo Bergamini (F 590); 2029, the Virginio Fasan (F 591); They will be replaced by two FREMM Evo (contract in 2024).
Bergamini class	4		ASW frigate (FREMM IT-ASW)	Carabiniere	F 593	2015	6,700 tonnes	10 FREMM are in service. 2 ships will be transferred to the Hellenic Navy: 2028, the Carlo Bergamini (F 590); 2029, the Virginio Fasan (F 591); They will be replaced by two FREMM Evo (contract in 2024).
Bergamini class	4		ASW frigate (FREMM IT-ASW)	Alpino	F 594	2016	6,700 tonnes	10 FREMM are in service. 2 ships will be transferred to the Hellenic Navy: 2028, the Carlo Bergamini (F 590); 2029, the Virginio Fasan (F 591); They will be replaced by two FREMM Evo (contract in 2024).
Bergamini class	2	–	GP / ASW frigate (FREMM IT-GP-e)	Spartaco Schergat	F 598	2025	6,700 tonnes	10 FREMM are in service. 2 ships will be transferred to the Hellenic Navy: 2028, the Carlo Bergamini (F 590); 2029, the Virginio Fasan (F 591); They will be replaced by two FREMM Evo (contract in 2024).
Bergamini class	2	–	GP / ASW frigate (FREMM IT-GP-e)	Emilio Bianchi	F 599	2025	6,700 tonnes	10 FREMM are in service. 2 ships will be transferred to the Hellenic Navy: 2028, the Carlo Bergamini (F 590); 2029, the Virginio Fasan (F 591); They will be replaced by two FREMM Evo (contract in 2024).
Thaon di Revel class	2		OPV (PPA Light)	Paolo Thaon di Revel	P 430	2021	5,830 tonnes	The Italian Navy signed a contract with the OCCAR to get all of its seven PPA to the "Full" standard.
Thaon di Revel class	2		OPV (PPA Light)	Francesco Morosini	P 431	2022	5,830 tonnes	The Italian Navy signed a contract with the OCCAR to get all of its seven PPA to the "Full" standard.
Thaon di Revel class	1		OPV (PPA Light+)	Raimondo Montecuccoli	P 432	2023	5,880 tonnes	First to the PPA Light+ standard with AA" capabilities. To be modernised to the "Full" standard.
Thaon di Revel class	2 (+2 on order)		OPV (PPA Full)	Giovanni delle Bande Nere	P 434	2024	6,270 tonnes	Delivered from the start to the "PPA Full" standard.
Thaon di Revel class	2 (+2 on order)		OPV (PPA Full)	Domenico Millelire	p 436	2026	6,270 tonnes	Delivered from the start to the "PPA Full" standard.
Offshore patrol vessels (9)
Comandanti class	4		OPV+	Comandante Cigala Fulgosi	P 490	2004	1,520 tonnes	Planned to be eventually replaced by the EPC / MMPC in the 2030.
Comandanti class	4		OPV+	Comandante Borsini	P 491	2004	1,520 tonnes	Planned to be eventually replaced by the EPC / MMPC in the 2030.
Comandanti class	4		OPV+	Comandante Bettica	P 492	2004	1,520 tonnes	Planned to be eventually replaced by the EPC / MMPC in the 2030.
Comandanti class	4		OPV+	Comandante Foscari	P 493	2004	1,520 tonnes	Planned to be eventually replaced by the EPC / MMPC in the 2030.
Sirio class	2		OPV+	Sirio	P 409	2003	1,549 tonnes	To be replaced eventually with the PPX class.
Sirio class	2		OPV+	Orione	P 410	2003	1,549 tonnes	To be replaced eventually with the PPX class.
Cassiopea class	3		OPV	Cassiopea	P 401	1989	1,499 tonnes	To be replaced with the PPX class from 2027. The retirement is planned for 2028 - 2030.
Cassiopea class	3		OPV	Spica	P 403	1991	1,499 tonnes	To be replaced with the PPX class from 2027. The retirement is planned for 2028 - 2030.
Cassiopea class	3		OPV	Vega	P 404	1992	1,499 tonnes	To be replaced with the PPX class from 2027. The retirement is planned for 2028 - 2030.
Patrol boat (4)
Esploratore class	4		Patrol boat	Esploratore	P 405	1997	188 tonnes	
Esploratore class	4		Patrol boat	Sentinella	P 406	1998	188 tonnes	
Esploratore class	4		Patrol boat	Vedetta	P 407	1999	188 tonnes	
Esploratore class	4		Patrol boat	Staffetta	P 408	2005	188 tonnes	
Patrol vessel (2)
Angelo Cabrini class	2		High-speed multipurpose patrol vessel	Angelo Cabrini	P 420	2019	190 tonnes	Class also known as the UNPAV.
Angelo Cabrini class	2		High-speed multipurpose patrol vessel	Tullio Tedeschi	P 421	2020	190 tonnes	Class also known as the UNPAV.
Minehunters (9)
Lerici class	1		Minehunter	Vieste	M 5553	1985	503 tonnes	Will be replaced by CNG.
Gaeta class	8		Minehunter	Gaeta	M 5554	1992	720 tonnes	Will be replaced by CNG.
Gaeta class	8		Minehunter	Termoli	M 5555	1992	720 tonnes	Will be replaced by CNG.
Gaeta class	8		Minehunter	Alghero	M 5556	1993	720 tonnes	Will be replaced by CNG.
Gaeta class	8		Minehunter	Numana	M 5557	1993	720 tonnes	Will be replaced by CNG.
Gaeta class	8		Minehunter	Crotone	M 5558	1994	720 tonnes	Will be replaced by CNG.
Gaeta class	8		Minehunter	Viareggio	M 5559	1994	720 tonnes	Will be replaced by CNG.
Gaeta class	8		Minehunter	Chioggia	M 5560	1996	720 tonnes	Will be replaced by CNG.
Gaeta class	8		Minehunter	Rimini	M 5561	1996	720 tonnes	Will be replaced by CNG.
Signal intelligence (1)
Classe Elettra	1		ELINT / SIGINT	Elettra	A 5340	2003	3,180 tonnes	Ship based on the Alliance ship design.

== Auxiliary fleet ==
The Italian Navy keeps in service a number of auxiliary and support ships. These include:

Class	In service	Picture	Type	Ship	No.	Comm.	Disp.	Notes
Logistic support (3)
Vulcano class	2 (+2 planned)		Command & logistic support ship	Vulcano	A 5335	2021	27,200 tonnes	A total of 4 ships in this class are planned.
Vulcano class	2 (+2 planned)		Command & logistic support ship	Atlante	A 5336	2025	27,200 tonnes	A total of 4 ships in this class are planned.
Etna class	1		AOR - replenishment oiler / command & logistic support ship	Etna	A 5326	1998	13,400 tonnes	
Coastal logistic support (30)
Panarea class	4		Coastal oil tanker	Panarea	A 5370	1986	863 tonnes	Transport capacity of 550 t (1,210,000 lb).
Panarea class	4		Coastal oil tanker	Linosa	A 5371	1986	863 tonnes	Transport capacity of 550 t (1,210,000 lb).
Panarea class	4		Coastal oil tanker	Favignana	A 5372	1987	863 tonnes	Transport capacity of 550 t (1,210,000 lb).
Panarea class	4		Coastal oil tanker	Salina	A 5373	1988	863 tonnes	Transport capacity of 550 t (1,210,000 lb).
Simeto class	2	–	Water tanker	Ticino	A 5376	1994	2,027 tonnes	
Simeto class	2	–	Water tanker	Tirso	A 5377	1994	2,027 tonnes	
Gorgona class	6		Coastal transport ship	Gorgona	A 5347	1986	800 tonnes	Ship with minelaying capability. To be replaced by the MTC-F class.
Gorgona class	6		Coastal transport ship	Tremiti	A 5348	1987	800 tonnes	Ship with minelaying capability. To be replaced by the MTC-F class.
Gorgona class	6		Coastal transport ship	Caprera	A 5349	1987	800 tonnes	Ship with minelaying capability. To be replaced by the MTC-F class.
Gorgona class	6		Coastal transport ship	Pantelleria	A 5351	1987	800 tonnes	Ship with minelaying capability. To be replaced by the MTC-F class.
Gorgona class	6		Coastal transport ship	Lipari	A 5352	1987	800 tonnes	Ship with minelaying capability. To be replaced by the MTC-F class.
Gorgona class	6		Coastal transport ship	Capri	A 5353	1987	800 tonnes	Ship with minelaying capability. To be replaced by the MTC-F class.
Ponza class	5		Coastal transport ship (lighthouse and maritime signaling service)	Ponza	A 5364	1988	685 tonnes	Ship with minelaying capability. To be replaced by the MTC-F class.
Ponza class	5		Coastal transport ship (lighthouse and maritime signaling service)	Levanzo	A 5366	1989	685 tonnes	Ship with minelaying capability. To be replaced by the MTC-F class.
Ponza class	5		Coastal transport ship (lighthouse and maritime signaling service)	Tavolara	A 5367	1989	685 tonnes	Ship with minelaying capability. To be replaced by the MTC-F class.
Ponza class	5		Coastal transport ship (lighthouse and maritime signaling service)	Palmaria	A 5368	1989	685 tonnes	Ship with minelaying capability. To be replaced by the MTC-F class.
Ponza class	5		Coastal transport ship (lighthouse and maritime signaling service)	Procida	A 5383	1990	685 tonnes	Ship with minelaying capability. To be replaced by the MTC-F class.
GGS 1012 class	13	–	Harbour tanker	–	GGS1012	–	500 tonnes	GGS-1018 launched in December 2012. The GGS-1019 & GGS-2020 were launched by Cantiere Navale Tringali in 2001 and 2002.
GGS 1012 class	13	–	Harbour tanker	–	GGS1013	–	500 tonnes	GGS-1018 launched in December 2012. The GGS-1019 & GGS-2020 were launched by Cantiere Navale Tringali in 2001 and 2002.
GGS 1012 class	13	–	Harbour tanker	–	GGS1014	–	500 tonnes	GGS-1018 launched in December 2012. The GGS-1019 & GGS-2020 were launched by Cantiere Navale Tringali in 2001 and 2002.
GGS 1012 class	13	–	Harbour tanker	–	GGS1015	–	500 tonnes	GGS-1018 launched in December 2012. The GGS-1019 & GGS-2020 were launched by Cantiere Navale Tringali in 2001 and 2002.
GGS 1012 class	13	–	Harbour tanker	–	GGS1016	–	500 tonnes	GGS-1018 launched in December 2012. The GGS-1019 & GGS-2020 were launched by Cantiere Navale Tringali in 2001 and 2002.
GGS 1012 class	13	–	Harbour tanker	–	GGS1017	–	500 tonnes	GGS-1018 launched in December 2012. The GGS-1019 & GGS-2020 were launched by Cantiere Navale Tringali in 2001 and 2002.
GGS 1012 class	13	–	Harbour tanker	–	GGS1018	–	500 tonnes	GGS-1018 launched in December 2012. The GGS-1019 & GGS-2020 were launched by Cantiere Navale Tringali in 2001 and 2002.
GGS 1012 class	13	–	Harbour tanker	–	GGS1019	–	500 tonnes	GGS-1018 launched in December 2012. The GGS-1019 & GGS-2020 were launched by Cantiere Navale Tringali in 2001 and 2002.
GGS 1012 class	13	–	Harbour tanker	–	GGS1020	–	500 tonnes	GGS-1018 launched in December 2012. The GGS-1019 & GGS-2020 were launched by Cantiere Navale Tringali in 2001 and 2002.
GGS 1012 class	13	–	Harbour tanker	–	GRS/G 1010	–	500 tonnes	GGS-1018 launched in December 2012. The GGS-1019 & GGS-2020 were launched by Cantiere Navale Tringali in 2001 and 2002.
GGS 1012 class	13	–	Harbour tanker	–	GRS/G 1011	–	500 tonnes	GGS-1018 launched in December 2012. The GGS-1019 & GGS-2020 were launched by Cantiere Navale Tringali in 2001 and 2002.
GGS 1012 class	13	–	Harbour tanker	–	GRS/G 1012	–	500 tonnes	GGS-1018 launched in December 2012. The GGS-1019 & GGS-2020 were launched by Cantiere Navale Tringali in 2001 and 2002.
GGS 1012 class	13	–	Harbour tanker	–	GRS/G 1013	–	500 tonnes	GGS-1018 launched in December 2012. The GGS-1019 & GGS-2020 were launched by Cantiere Navale Tringali in 2001 and 2002.
Landing crafts (41)
LC23 class	4 (+6 planned)	–	LCM	–	–	–	200 tonnes	Landing crafts used with the Italian aircraft carrier Trieste. Six additional landing crafts are planned to be purchased for use with the Nuova Unità Anfibia - LXD.
LC23 class	4 (+6 planned)	–	LCM	–	–	–	200 tonnes	Landing crafts used with the Italian aircraft carrier Trieste. Six additional landing crafts are planned to be purchased for use with the Nuova Unità Anfibia - LXD.
LC23 class	4 (+6 planned)	–	LCM	–	–	–	200 tonnes	Landing crafts used with the Italian aircraft carrier Trieste. Six additional landing crafts are planned to be purchased for use with the Nuova Unità Anfibia - LXD.
LC23 class	4 (+6 planned)	–	LCM	–	–	–	200 tonnes	Landing crafts used with the Italian aircraft carrier Trieste. Six additional landing crafts are planned to be purchased for use with the Nuova Unità Anfibia - LXD.
LCM62 class MTM C828	9		LCM	–	LCM 62	2012	76 tonnes	Vessels used with the San Giorgio landing platform dock. Orders: 4 in 2007; 1 in 2009; 4 in 2010
LCM62 class MTM C828	9		LCM	–	LCM 63	2012	76 tonnes	Vessels used with the San Giorgio landing platform dock. Orders: 4 in 2007; 1 in 2009; 4 in 2010
LCM62 class MTM C828	9		LCM	–	LCM 64	2012	76 tonnes	Vessels used with the San Giorgio landing platform dock. Orders: 4 in 2007; 1 in 2009; 4 in 2010
LCM62 class MTM C828	9		LCM	–	LCM 65	2012	76 tonnes	Vessels used with the San Giorgio landing platform dock. Orders: 4 in 2007; 1 in 2009; 4 in 2010
LCM62 class MTM C828	9		LCM	–	LCM 66	2012	76 tonnes	Vessels used with the San Giorgio landing platform dock. Orders: 4 in 2007; 1 in 2009; 4 in 2010
LCM62 class MTM C828	9		LCM	–	LCM 67	2012	76 tonnes	Vessels used with the San Giorgio landing platform dock. Orders: 4 in 2007; 1 in 2009; 4 in 2010
LCM62 class MTM C828	9		LCM	–	LCM 68	2012	76 tonnes	Vessels used with the San Giorgio landing platform dock. Orders: 4 in 2007; 1 in 2009; 4 in 2010
LCM62 class MTM C828	9		LCM	–	LCM 69	2012	76 tonnes	Vessels used with the San Giorgio landing platform dock. Orders: 4 in 2007; 1 in 2009; 4 in 2010
LCM62 class MTM C828	9		LCM	–	LCM 70	2012	76 tonnes	Vessels used with the San Giorgio landing platform dock. Orders: 4 in 2007; 1 in 2009; 4 in 2010
MTM217 class	8	–	LCM	–	MTM 217	1968	65 tonnes	Vessels used with the San Giorgio landing platform dock.
MTM217 class	8	–	LCM	–	MTM 218	1968	65 tonnes	Vessels used with the San Giorgio landing platform dock.
MTM217 class	8	–	LCM	–	MTM 219	1968	65 tonnes	Vessels used with the San Giorgio landing platform dock.
MTM217 class	8	–	LCM	–	MTM 220	1968	65 tonnes	Vessels used with the San Giorgio landing platform dock.
MTM217 class	8	–	LCM	–	MTM 221	1968	65 tonnes	Vessels used with the San Giorgio landing platform dock.
MTM217 class	8	–	LCM	–	MTM 222	1968	65 tonnes	Vessels used with the San Giorgio landing platform dock.
MTM217 class	8	–	LCM	–	MTM 227	1968	65 tonnes	Vessels used with the San Giorgio landing platform dock.
MTM217 class	8	–	LCM	–	MTM 228	1968	65 tonnes	Vessels used with the San Giorgio landing platform dock.
MTP96 class	20		LCVP	–	MDN 94	1990s	14 tonnes	Vessels used with the San Giorgio landing platform dock.
MTP96 class	20		LCVP	–	MDN 95	1990s	14 tonnes	Vessels used with the San Giorgio landing platform dock.
MTP96 class	20		LCVP	–	MDN 96	1990s	14 tonnes	Vessels used with the San Giorgio landing platform dock.
MTP96 class	20		LCVP	–	MDN 97	1990s	14 tonnes	Vessels used with the San Giorgio landing platform dock.
MTP96 class	20		LCVP	–	MDN 98	1990s	14 tonnes	Vessels used with the San Giorgio landing platform dock.
MTP96 class	20		LCVP	–	MDN 99	1990s	14 tonnes	Vessels used with the San Giorgio landing platform dock.
MTP96 class	20		LCVP	–	MDN 100	1990s	14 tonnes	Vessels used with the San Giorgio landing platform dock.
MTP96 class	20		LCVP	–	MDN 101	1990s	14 tonnes	Vessels used with the San Giorgio landing platform dock.
MTP96 class	20		LCVP	–	MDN 102	1990s	14 tonnes	Vessels used with the San Giorgio landing platform dock.
MTP96 class	20		LCVP	–	MDN 103	1990s	14 tonnes	Vessels used with the San Giorgio landing platform dock.
MTP96 class	20		LCVP	–	MDN 104	1990s	14 tonnes	Vessels used with the San Giorgio landing platform dock.
MTP96 class	20		LCVP	–	MDN 108	1990s	14 tonnes	Vessels used with the San Giorgio landing platform dock.
MTP96 class	20		LCVP	–	MDN 109	1990s	14 tonnes	Vessels used with the San Giorgio landing platform dock.
MTP96 class	20		LCVP	–	MDN 114	1990s	14 tonnes	Vessels used with the San Giorgio landing platform dock.
MTP96 class	20		LCVP	–	MDN 115	1990s	14 tonnes	Vessels used with the San Giorgio landing platform dock.
MTP96 class	20		LCVP	–	MDN 116	1990s	14 tonnes	Vessels used with the San Giorgio landing platform dock.
MTP96 class	20		LCVP	–	MDN 117	1990s	14 tonnes	Vessels used with the San Giorgio landing platform dock.
MTP96 class	20		LCVP	–	MDN 118	1990s	14 tonnes	Vessels used with the San Giorgio landing platform dock.
MTP96 class	20		LCVP	–	MDN 119	1990s	14 tonnes	Vessels used with the San Giorgio landing platform dock.
MTP96 class	20		LCVP	–	MDN 120	1990s	14 tonnes	Vessels used with the San Giorgio landing platform dock.
Light boats (~72)
FFC 15 class	2	–	Fast assault craft	–	–	2023	20 tonnes	Craft produced by Baglietto. Entered service in May 2019, it will equip the Italian aircraft carrier Trieste. Length: 15.86 m (52.0 ft)
FFC 15 class	2	–	Fast assault craft	–	–	2023	20 tonnes	Craft produced by Baglietto. Entered service in May 2019, it will equip the Italian aircraft carrier Trieste. Length: 15.86 m (52.0 ft)
RHIB (various models)	≥ 70		RHIB	–	–	–	–	Some of the models include: Zodiac Hurricane: Hurricane 935; Hurricane 753; Hurricane 733 II; STENMAR; STENMAR 6.70; STENMAR 6.90; STENMAR 9.20; ARIMAR; ARIMAR 710 Pro; ARIMAR 920 PRO; CABI Cattaneo 11m
Underwater support vessels (4)
Tritone class	1		MROSS	Tritone	A 5341	2026	6,650 tonnes	Civilian ship acquired and transformed into a MROSS. It is also used in seabed warfare.
Anteo class	1		Submarine rescue ship	Anteo	A 5309	1980	3,874 tonnes	Vessel equipped with a DRASS SRV-300, a deep-submergence rescue vehicle. The system is being replaced by the SDO-SuRS (Olterra - A5321).
Marino class	2	–	Diving support vessels	Mario Marino	Y 498	1985	97 tonnes	The vessels are used by Comando Subacquei Incursori (COMSUBIN) for training and operational duties.
Marino class	2	–	Diving support vessels	Alcide Pedretti	Y 499	1984	97 tonnes	The vessels are used by Comando Subacquei Incursori (COMSUBIN) for training and operational duties.
Research and multi-purpose support ships (4)
–	1		Research vessel	Alliance	A 5345	(1988); 2016	2,920 tonnes	Vessel operated by the Italian Navy, but owned by the CMRE (a NATO institute).
–	1		Coastal research vessel	Leonardo	A 5301	(2002); 2009	433 tonnes	Vessel operated by the Italian Navy from La Spezia, but owned by the CMRE (a NATO institute).
Rossetti class	2		Coastal research vessel	Raffaele Rossetti	A 5315	1986	324 tonnes	
Rossetti class	2		Coastal research vessel	Vincenzo Martellotta	A 5320	1989	324 tonnes	
Hydrographic survey (3)
–	1		Hydrographic survey vessel	Ammiraglio Magnaghi	A 5303	1975	1,744 tonnes	Being replaced by the NIOM class (Quirinale).
Ninfe class	2		Hydrographic survey vessel	Aretusa	A 5304	2002	415 tonnes	
Ninfe class	2		Hydrographic survey vessel	Galatea	A 5308	2002	415 tonnes	
Miscellaneous boats (1)
–	1	–	Ferry-boat	Cheradi	Y 402	1992	180 tonnes	
Tugboats (44)
Ciclope class	6		Deep sea tugboat	Ciclope	A 5319	–	660 tonnes	
Ciclope class	6		Deep sea tugboat	Titano	A 5324	–	660 tonnes	
Ciclope class	6		Deep sea tugboat	Polifemo	A 5325	–	660 tonnes	
Ciclope class	6		Deep sea tugboat	Gigante	A 5328	–	660 tonnes	
Ciclope class	6		Deep sea tugboat	Saturno	A 5330	–	660 tonnes	
Ciclope class	6		Deep sea tugboat	Tenace	A 5365	–	660 tonnes	
Damen Azimuth Stern Drive Tug 2810 class	1	–	Coastal tugboat	Ercole	Y 430	2014	540 tonnes	Launched in 2002 by Damen shipyards.
Porto class	6		Coastal tugboat	Porto Torres	Y 416	–	412 tonnes	Ships in this class already decommissioned: Porto Fossone (Y 415); Portoferraio (Y 425); Portovenere (Y 426); Portofino (Y 436); Riva Trigoso (Y 443)
Porto class	6		Coastal tugboat	Porto Corsini	Y 417	–	412 tonnes	Ships in this class already decommissioned: Porto Fossone (Y 415); Portoferraio (Y 425); Portovenere (Y 426); Portofino (Y 436); Riva Trigoso (Y 443)
Porto class	6		Coastal tugboat	Porto Empedocle	Y 421	–	412 tonnes	Ships in this class already decommissioned: Porto Fossone (Y 415); Portoferraio (Y 425); Portovenere (Y 426); Portofino (Y 436); Riva Trigoso (Y 443)
Porto class	6		Coastal tugboat	Porto Pisano	Y 422	–	412 tonnes	Ships in this class already decommissioned: Porto Fossone (Y 415); Portoferraio (Y 425); Portovenere (Y 426); Portofino (Y 436); Riva Trigoso (Y 443)
Porto class	6		Coastal tugboat	Porto Conte	Y 423	–	412 tonnes	Ships in this class already decommissioned: Porto Fossone (Y 415); Portoferraio (Y 425); Portovenere (Y 426); Portofino (Y 436); Riva Trigoso (Y 443)
Porto class	6		Coastal tugboat	Porto Salvo	Y 428	–	412 tonnes	Ships in this class already decommissioned: Porto Fossone (Y 415); Portoferraio (Y 425); Portovenere (Y 426); Portofino (Y 436); Riva Trigoso (Y 443)
RP 101 class	10	–	Harbour tugboats	RP 101	Y 403	–	85 tonnes	Batch 1 of harbour tugboats
RP 101 class	10	–	Harbour tugboats	RP 102	Y 404	–		Batch 1 of harbour tugboats
RP 101 class	10	–	Harbour tugboats	RP 104	Y 407	–		Batch 1 of harbour tugboats
RP 101 class	10	–	Harbour tugboats	RP 106	Y 410	–		Batch 1 of harbour tugboats
RP 101 class	10	–	Harbour tugboats	RP 107	Y 413	–		Batch 1 of harbour tugboats
RP 101 class	10	–	Harbour tugboats	RP 108	Y 452	–		Batch 1 of harbour tugboats
RP 101 class	10	–	Harbour tugboats	RP 109	Y 456	–		Batch 1 of harbour tugboats
RP 101 class	10	–	Harbour tugboats	RP 110	Y 458	–		Batch 1 of harbour tugboats
RP 101 class	10	–	Harbour tugboats	RP 111	Y 460	–		Batch 1 of harbour tugboats
RP 101 class	10	–	Harbour tugboats	RP 112	Y 462	–		Batch 1 of harbour tugboats
RP 113 class	2	–	Harbour tugboats	RP 113	Y 463	–	120 tonnes	Batch 2 of harbour tugboats
RP 113 class	2	–	Harbour tugboats	RP 116	Y 466	–	120 tonnes	Batch 2 of harbour tugboats
RP 118 class	6	–	Harbour tugboats	RP 118	Y 468	–	85 tonnes	Batch 3 of harbour tugboats
RP 118 class	6	–	Harbour tugboats	RP 119	Y 470	–	85 tonnes	Batch 3 of harbour tugboats
RP 118 class	6	–	Harbour tugboats	RP 120	Y 471	–	85 tonnes	Batch 3 of harbour tugboats
RP 118 class	6	–	Harbour tugboats	RP 122	Y 473	–	85 tonnes	Batch 3 of harbour tugboats
RP 118 class	6	–	Harbour tugboats	RP 123	Y 476	–	85 tonnes	Batch 3 of harbour tugboats
RP 118 class	6	–	Harbour tugboats	RP 124	Y 477	–	85 tonnes	Batch 3 of harbour tugboats
RP 125 class	10	–	Harbour tugboats	RP 125	Y 478	–	76.4 tonnes	Batch 4 of harbour tugboats
RP 125 class	10	–	Harbour tugboats	RP 126	Y 479	–	76.4 tonnes	Batch 4 of harbour tugboats
RP 125 class	10	–	Harbour tugboats	RP 127	Y 480	–	76.4 tonnes	Batch 4 of harbour tugboats
RP 125 class	10	–	Harbour tugboats	RP 128	Y 481	–	76.4 tonnes	Batch 4 of harbour tugboats
RP 125 class	10	–	Harbour tugboats	RP 129	Y 482	–	76.4 tonnes	Batch 4 of harbour tugboats
RP 125 class	10	–	Harbour tugboats	RP 130	Y 483	–	76.4 tonnes	Batch 4 of harbour tugboats
RP 125 class	10	–	Harbour tugboats	RP 131	Y 484	–	76.4 tonnes	Batch 4 of harbour tugboats
RP 125 class	10	–	Harbour tugboats	RP 132	Y 487	–	76.4 tonnes	Batch 4 of harbour tugboats
RP 125 class	10	–	Harbour tugboats	RP 133	Y 485	–	76.4 tonnes	Batch 4 of harbour tugboats
RP 125 class	10	–	Harbour tugboats	RP 134	Y 486	–	76.4 tonnes	Batch 4 of harbour tugboats

=== Floating docks ===
Class	In service	Type	No.	Comm.	Disp.	Notes
GO 52 class	3	Floating dock	GO 52	1988 - 1993	6,000 tonnes	GO 53 based in Augusta as of 2018.
GO 52 class	3	Floating dock	GO 53	1988 - 1993	6,000 tonnes	GO 53 based in Augusta as of 2018.
GO 52 class	3	Floating dock	GO 54	1988 - 1993	6,000 tonnes	GO 53 based in Augusta as of 2018.
–	1	Floating dock	GO 11	1920	2,700 tonnes	
–	1	Floating dock	GO 51	1971	2,000 tonnes	Deployed in La Maddalena (Olbia). Length: 80 m (260 ft)
–	1	Floating dock	GO 58	1996	2,000 tonnes	
–	1	Floating dock	GO 20	1935	1,600 tonnes	
–	1	Floating dock	GO 1	1942	1,000 tonnes	
GO 22 class	1	Floating dock	GO 23	1935	1,000 tonnes	
–	1	Floating dock	GO 59	2014	1,000 tonnes	
–	1	Floating dock	GO 60	2018	1,000 tonnes	Based in La Spezia, also used at the Megaride dockyards in Napoli. Capacity: Length: 60 m (200 ft); Width: 13 m (43 ft)
GO 55 class	3	Floating dock	GO 55	1995 - 1996	850 tonnes	
GO 55 class	3	Floating dock	GO 56	1995 - 1996	850 tonnes	
GO 55 class	3	Floating dock	GO 57	1995 - 1996	850 tonnes	
–	1	Floating dock	GO 18A	2015	800 tonnes	Based at the Brindisi Naval Station.
–	1	Floating dock	GO 188	1920	600 tonnes	
–	1	Floating dock	GO 5	1893	100 tonnes	

=== Sail ships ===
Ship	In service	Picture	Type	No.	Comm.	Disp.	Notes
Sail training tall ships (3)
Amerigo Vespucci	1		Tall ship	A 5312	1931	4,300 tonnes	Last heavy update in 2013 - 2016.
Palinuro	1		Full-rigged ship	A 5311	(1934); 1955	1,341 tonnes	
Italia	1		Brigantine	A 5314	(1993); 2007	404 tonnes	
Sail training vessel (8)
Orsa Maggiore	1		Sail training vessel	A 5323	1995	80 tonnes	Length: 28.3 m (93 ft)
Stella Polare	1		Sail training vessel	A 5313	1965	48 tonnes	Length: 21.47 m (70.4 ft)
Corsaro II	1		Sail training vessel	A 5316	1961	47 tonnes	Length: 20.9 m (69 ft)
Caroly	1	–	Sail training vessel	A 5302	(1948); 1982	56 tonnes	Length: 23.66 m (77.6 ft)
Capricia	1	–	Sail training vessel	A 5322	(1963); 1993	55 tonnes	Length: 22.5 m (74 ft)
Quadrante	1	–	Sail training vessel	–	–	–	
Tara	1	–	Sail training vessel	–	–	–	
Ussaro	1	–	Sail training vessel	–	–	–	
SVMM (27)
Albatros	1	–	Sailing boat cruise	–	–	–	
Andromeda	1	–	Sailing boat cruise	–	–	–	
Antares	1	–	Sailing boat cruise	–	–	–	
Aquarius	1	–	Sailing boat cruise	–	–	–	
Aquilante	1	–	Sailing boat cruise	IEN 026	–	–	
Aquilone	1	–	Sailing boat cruise	–	–	–	
Artica II	1	–	Sailing boat cruise	–	–	7 tonnes	Length: 12.9 m (42 ft)
Bellatrix	1	–	Sailing boat cruise	–	–	–	
Calypso	1	–	Sailing boat cruise	–	–	–	
Canopus	1	–	Sailing boat cruise	IEN 033	–	–	
Chaplin	1	–	Sailing boat cruise	–	1974 (2008)	15 tonnes	Length: 16.75 m (55.0 ft)
Cignus	1	–	Sailing boat cruise	–	–	–	
Cobalt	1	–	Sailing boat cruise	–	–	–	
Deneb	1	–	Sailing boat cruise	–	–	–	
Dragone	1	–	Sailing boat cruise	–	–	–	
Fomalhaut	1	–	Sailing boat cruise	–	–	–	
Gabbiano	1	–	Sailing boat cruise	–	–	–	
Gemini	1	–	Sailing boat cruise	–	–	–	
Grifone bianco	1	–	Sailing boat cruise	–	–	–	
Nausica	1	–	Sailing boat cruise	–	–	–	
Pegaso	1	–	Sailing boat cruise	ITA 883	–	–	Class Mini 650
Pellicano	1	–	Sailing boat cruise	–	–	–	
Penelope	1	–	Sailing boat cruise	–	1965	–	
Sagittario	1	–	Sailing boat cruise	–	–	11 tonnes	Length: 15.7 m (52 ft)
Scorpione	1	–	Sailing boat cruise	–	–	–	
Sestante	1	–	Sailing boat cruise	IEN 029	–	–	
Seven seas	1	–	Sailing boat cruise	IEN 038	–	–	

== See also ==
- List of decommissioned ships of the Italian Navy

Other maritime organisations of Italy:

- List of Guardia di Finanza vessels
- List of Italian Coast Guard vessels
