= Qatari amphibious transport dock Al Fulk =

Warship under construction

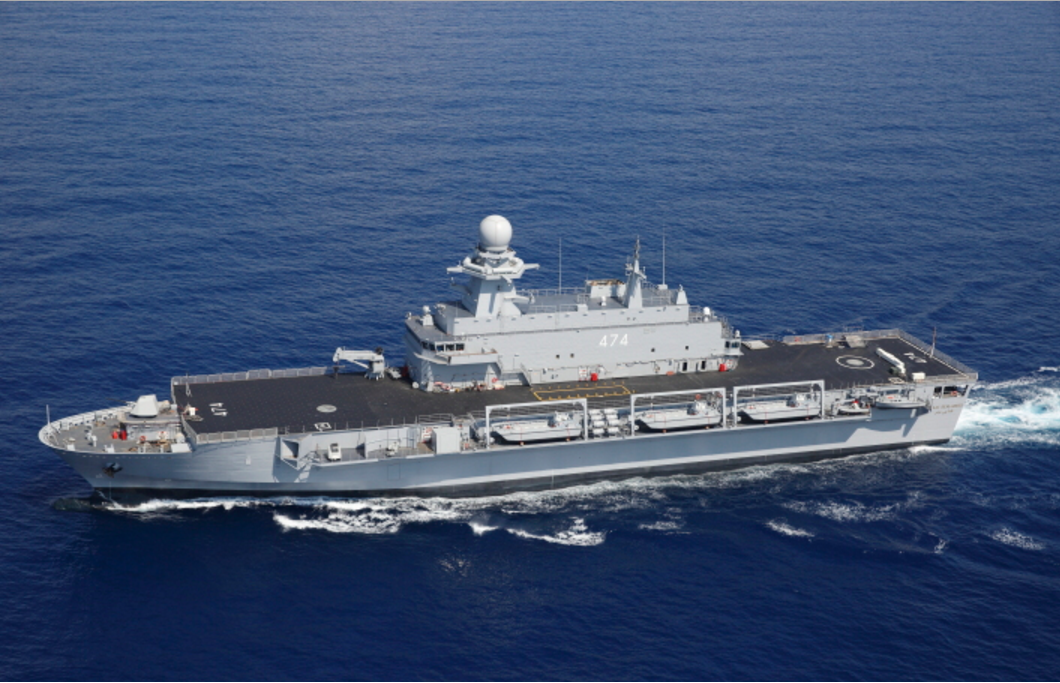
- Al Fulk's sister ship, Kalaat Béni Abbès

History

Qatar
- Name: Al Fulk
- Ordered: 2016
- Builder: Fincantieri at Palermo shipyard
- Laid down: 5 June 2021
- Launched: 24 January 2023
- Acquired: 29 November 2024
- Identification: Pennant number: L141
- Status: Fitting out

General characteristics
- Type: Ballistic missile defense amphibious transport dock
- Displacement: 8,800 t (8,700 long tons)
- Length: 142.9 m (468 ft 10 in) LOA; 127.6 m (418 ft 8 in) LPP
- Beam: 21.5 m (70 ft 6 in)
- Draught: 5.3 m (17 ft 5 in)
- Propulsion: 2 × diesel engines Everllence 12V32/44CR 12,000 kW (16,000 hp)
- Speed: 20 knots (37 km/h; 23 mph)
- Range: 7,000 nmi (13,000 km; 8,100 mi) at 15 knots (28 km/h; 17 mph)
- Troops: 440 soldiers
- Crew: 150
- Sensors & processing systems: 1 × Leonardo Kronos Power Shield, AESA LRR L-band radar; 2 × Navigation radar
- Armament: 1 × OTO Melara 76 mm/62 SR Super Rapido; 4 × OTO Melara 30 mm Marlin WS rapid fire gun; 2 × 8-cell SYLVER A50 VLS for Aster 15&30 missiles; Lacroix Defense Sylena Mk2 decoy launchers
- Aircraft carried: 3 × NHIndustries NH90
- Aviation facilities: Hangar

Al Fulk (L141) is an amphibious transport dock of the Qatari Emiri Navy.

== Development ==
The ship was built by the Italian firm Fincantieri as an enlarged and improved version of the San Giorgio class similar to the Algerian Kalaat Béni Abbès. The ship measures 143 metres (469 ft 2 in) long and 21.5 metres (70 ft 6 in) wide.

Al Fulk has a continuous flight deck with two deck-landing spots for helicopters at the bow and stern. Besides its role as an amphibious transport dock, Al Fulk is also tasked with ballistic missile defense. The ship took part in missile defense engagement in the Iran War in March 2026.

== Construction and career ==
Al Fulk was ordered in 2016, with her keel being laid in 2021. Her launch took place on 24 January 2023. Her sea trials started in May 2024.

On 29 November 2024, she was finally delivered to the Qatari Navy.
