= LCM62-class landing craft =

Ship series used by the Italian Navy

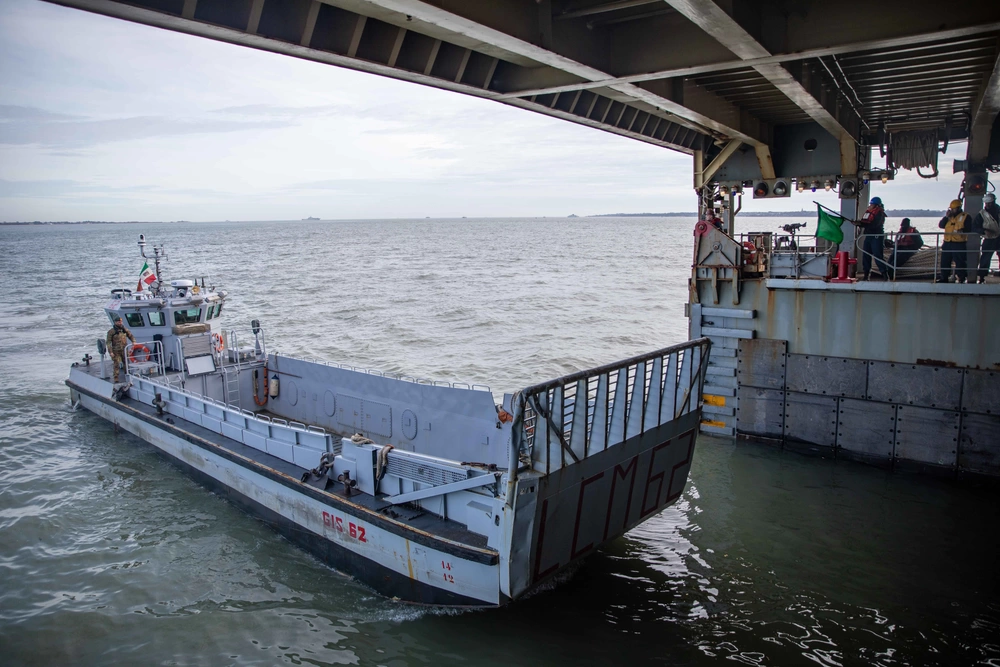

Class overview
- Name: LCM62 class
- Builders: Cantieri Navali Vittoria, Adria (Rovigo).
- Operators: Italian Navy; Algerian National Navy
- Preceded by: MTM217 class
- Cost: €998,000 (2007) per unit
- In service: 2010
- Planned: 12
- Active: 12

General characteristics
- Type: Landing craft mechanized
- Displacement: - 76 t (75 long tons) full load; - 65 t (64 long tons) light
- Length: 19.58 m (64 ft 3 in) LOA
- Beam: 5.1 m (16 ft 9 in) over all
- Draft: 3.8 m (12 ft 6 in)
- Propulsion: - 2 × shaft; - 2 × diesel engines Iveco Cursor 500 C13, 368 kW (493 bhp) each; - 2 × gearbox ZF550V
- Speed: 11 knots (20 km/h) loaded; 15 knots (28 km/h) light
- Range: 190 nmi (350 km; 220 mi) at 9 knots (17 km/h; 10 mph)
- Capacity: - 90 troops or; - 30 t (30 long tons) of cargo; - size cargo, 13.9 m (45 ft 7 in) X 3.9 m (12 ft 10 in)
- Complement: 3
- Sensors & processing systems: Navigation radar, GSM, VHF
- Notes: tank capacities: - fuel oil, 2,450 L (540 imp gal; 650 US gal); - fresh water, 240 L (53 imp gal; 63 US gal)

The LCM62 class is a series of landing craft mechanized used by the Italian Navy.

== History ==
The first four hulls were ordered by the Italian Ministry of Defense (NAVARM) on 21 December 2007, for €3,992,000. The fifth hull was ordered by NAVARM on 9 November 2009. The last four hulls were ordered by NAVARM on 21 December 2010.

The LCM62 class is designated by Vittoria Shipyards as the C828 class and is a vehicle crafted to support amphibious military action. The boats were designed for the transport of troops and ground vehicles, as part of landing operations on the coasts. These models are required and employed by all major navy forces, for their versatility and safety features guaranteed by the ballistic protection of the cabin. The hull and superstructure construction material is steel AH36. The closed and air-conditioned wheelhouse can accommodate up to three sailors. The wheelhouse and the front ramp door are equipped with ballistic protection against NATO 7.62×51mm A.P. bullets.

The MTM (Motozattera Trasporto Mezzi)-class landing crafts LCM62 have been developed by Studio Fast Service and Vittoria Shipyard for the Italian Navy. Nine of these crafts are operated aboard the three San Giorgio-class ships and are used by the San Marco Marine Brigade at Brindisi Naval Station homeport.

== Export ==
=== Algerian Navy ===
In July 2011 the Algerian Navy placed an order with Fincantieri for an improved version of the San Giorgio-class amphibious transport ships classified as "Bâtiment de Débarquement et de Soutien Logistique" (BDSL), and named Kalaat Béni Abbès The BDSL can accommodate three C828 landing craft mechanized, built in Ecrn (Etablissement de Construction et Réparation Navales) Shipyard of Mers-El-Kebir (Algeria), under license by Cantieri Vittoria

== Ships in class ==
Name	Pennant number	Hull number	Launched	Commissioned	Notes
LCM62 (MTM C.828) class construction data
LCM62	GIS62	C.828	4 December 2009	January 2010	
LCM63	GIS63	C.829	4 December 2009	January 2010	
LCM64	GIS64	C.830	4 December 2009	January 2010	
LCM65	GIS65	C.831	4 December 2009	January 2010	
LCM66	GIS66	C.833	16 March 2010	December 2010	
LCM67	GIS67	C.836	23 November 2011	2012	
LCM68	GIS68	C.837	23 November 2011	2012	
LCM69	GIS69	C.838	23 November 2011	2012	
LCM70	GIS70	C.839	23 November 2011	2012	
MTM C.828 class construction data
				2014	built in Algeria
				2014	built in Algeria
				2014	built in Algeria
