= Da Wu-class rescue and salvage ship =

Class of Taiwanese naval ships

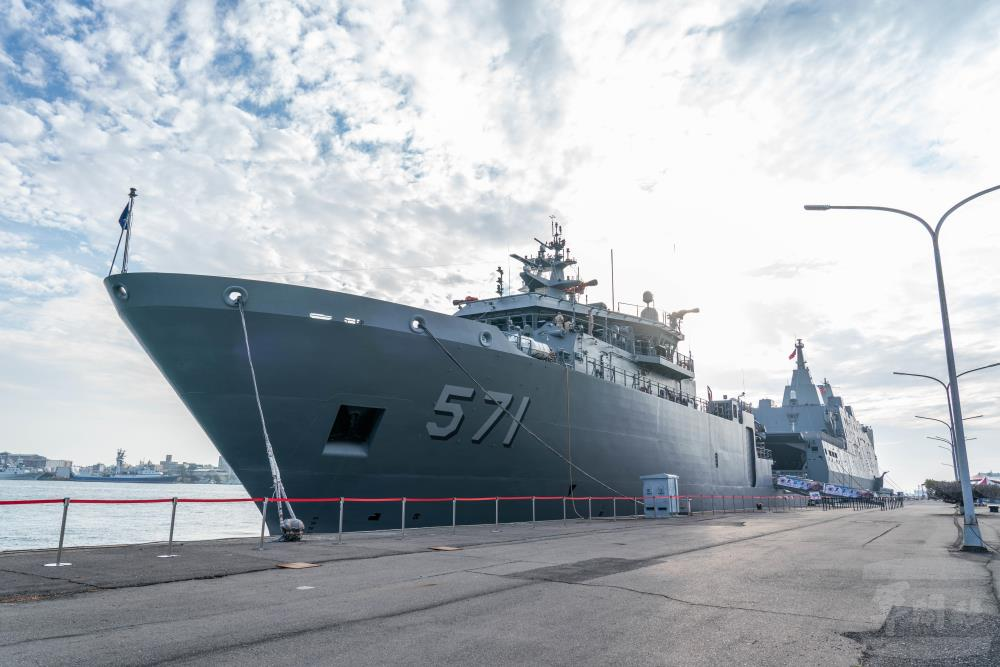
- Da Wu (ARS-571)

Class overview
- Builders: CSBC Corporation, Taiwan
- Built: 2021–present
- Planned: 6
- On order: 5
- Completed: 1

General characteristics
- Type: Rescue and salvage ship
- Displacement: 3,250 t (3,200 long tons)
- Length: 87 m (285 ft 5 in)
- Beam: 15.5 m (50 ft 10 in)
- Speed: 18 knots (33 km/h; 21 mph)

The Da Wu class are a class of Taiwanese naval rescue and salvage ships. The lead vessel, Da Wu (大武, ARS-571), was delivered to the Republic of China Navy (ROCN) in 2024.

== History ==
Construction began in 2021 and the keel of the lead vessel, Da Wu (大武, ARS-571), was laid in 2022. Da Wu was delivered by CSBC Corporation, Taiwan in 2024.

== Description ==
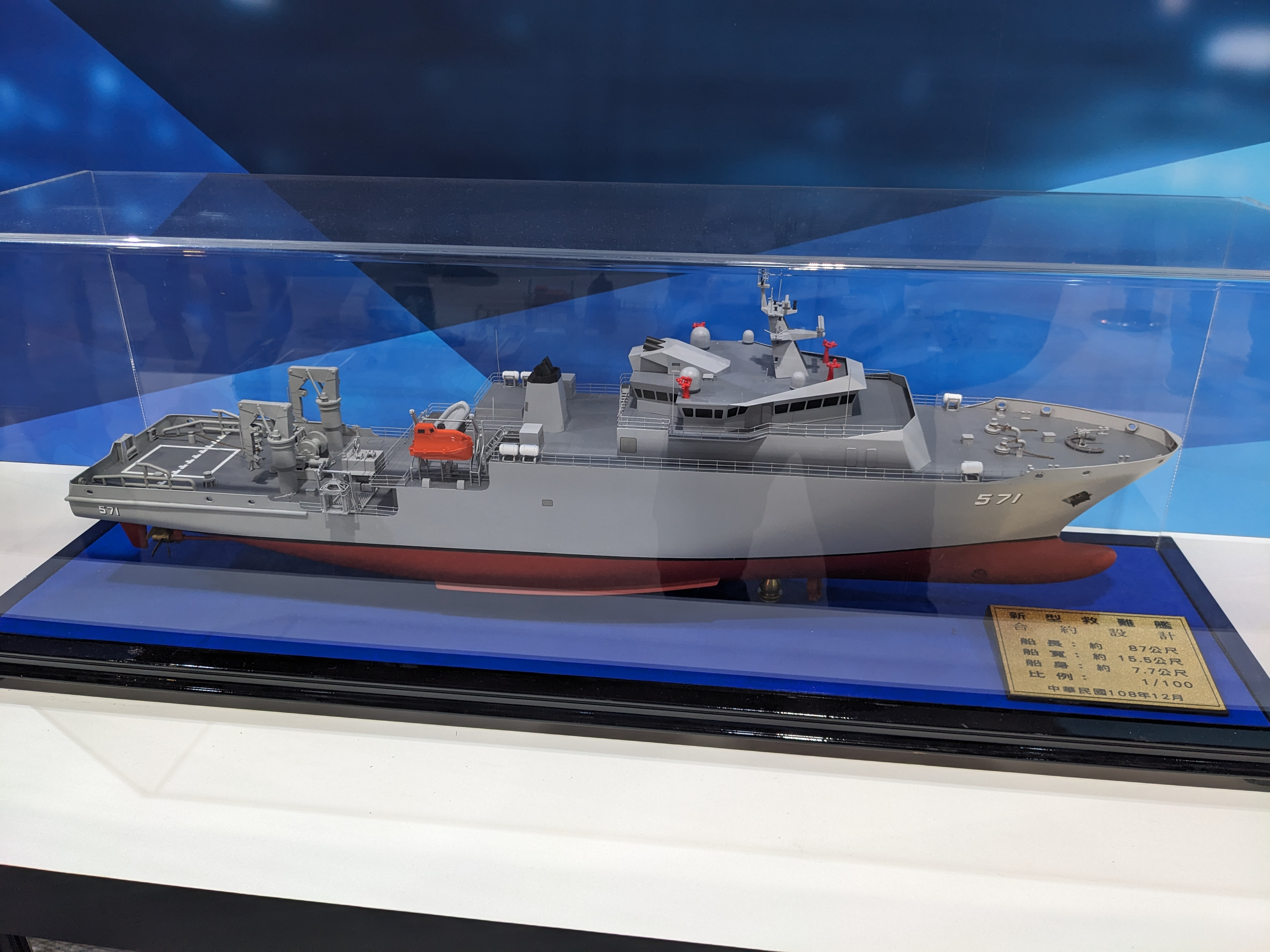
Model of the Da Wu

Vessels of the class are equipped with a diving bell capable of operating at 100 meters (330 ft). They also have a remote operated vehicle capable of operating at 500 meters (1,600 ft).

The Da Wu is 87 meters (285 ft 5 in) long, 15.5 meters (50 ft 10 in) wide and displaces 3,250 metric tons (3,200 long tons).

== Ships of class ==
Pennant Number	Name	Builder	Launched	Commissioned	Status	Note
ARS-571	Da Wu	CSBC Corporation, Taiwan	23 October 2024	31 October 2025	Active

== See also ==
- Safeguard-class rescue and salvage ship
- Geo Barents
- ERV Nene Hatun
- ROCS Ta Kuan
