= ROCS Ta Kuan =

Taiwanese Navy research vessel

ROCS Ta Kuan (AGS-1601)
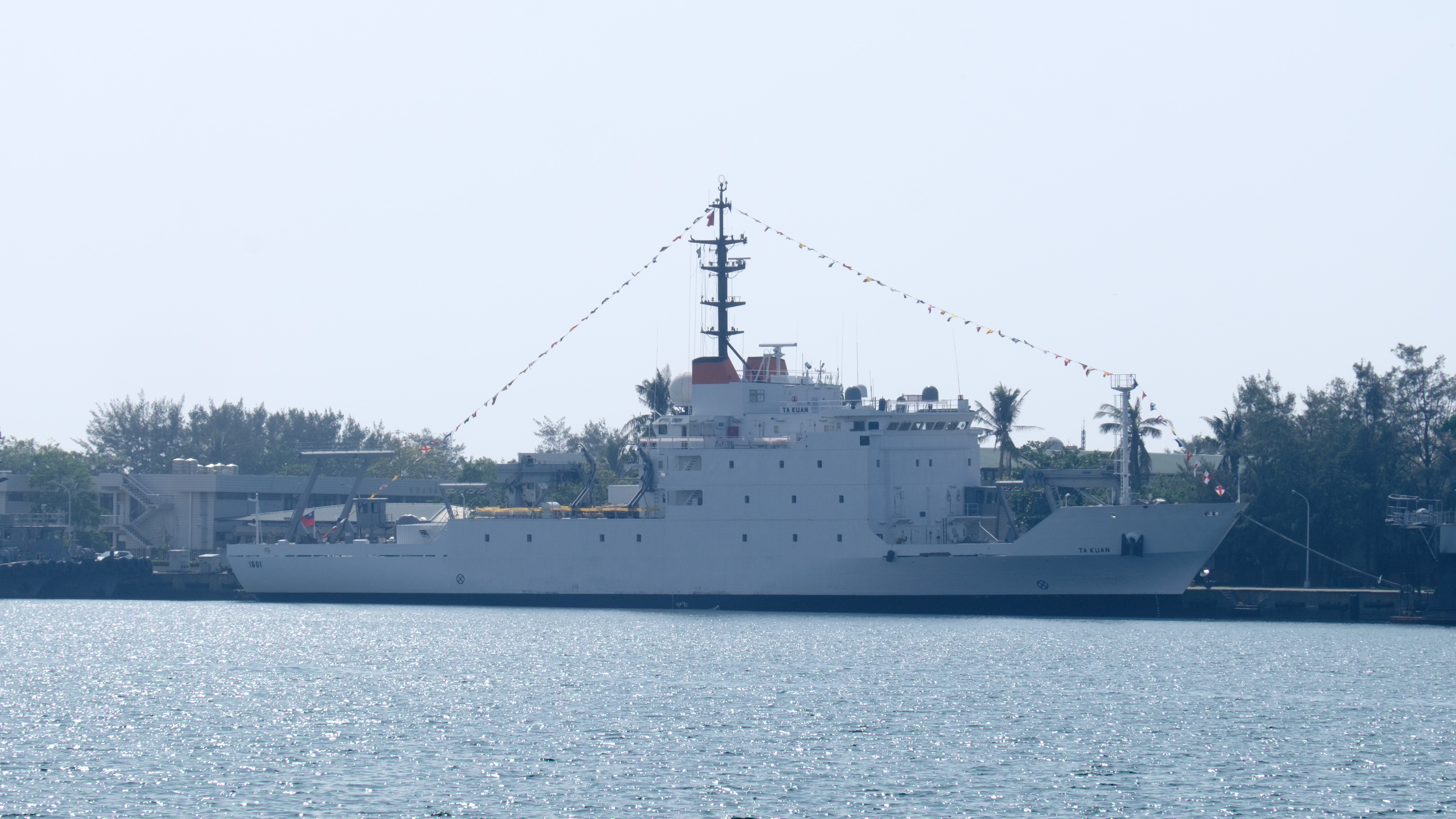
- ROCS Ta Kuan (AGS-1601) at Zuoying Naval Base

History

Taiwan
- Name: Ta Kuan
- Builder: Fincantieri
- Launched: 1995
- Commissioned: 1995
- Identification: Pennant number: (AGS-1601)
- Status: Active

General characteristics
- Class & type: Alliance-class research ship
- Propulsion: diesel engines, generators (wartsila, MAN ?)

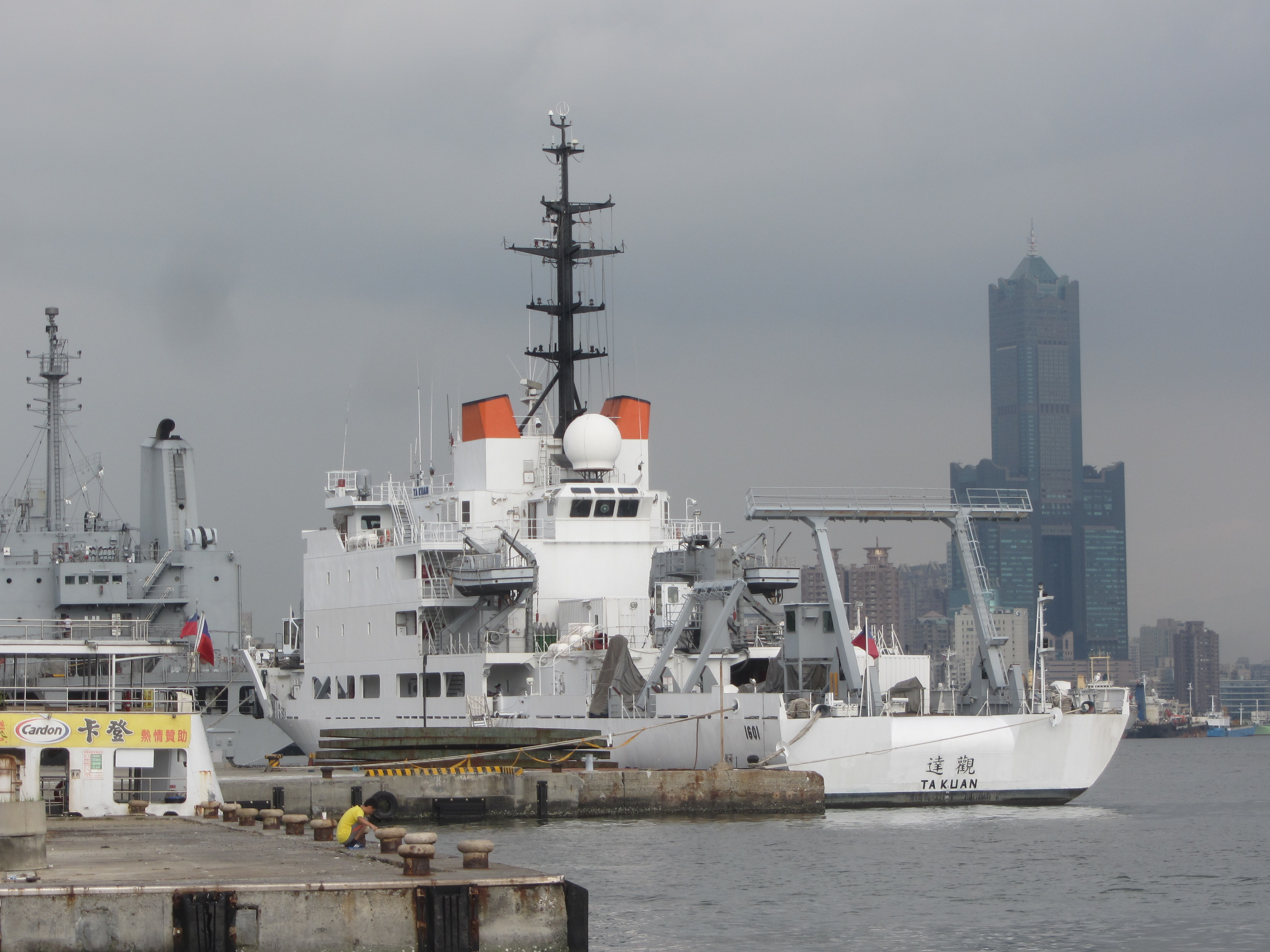
Ta Kuan at the Port of Kaohsiung

ROCS Ta Kuan (AGS-1601) is a Taiwanese Navy research vessel. Designed to carry out oceanographic and hydrographic research, as well as surveillance activities, the vessel's platform was developed from the Italian ship Alliance built for NATO.

== Design ==
She is a sister ship of Alliance and Elettra, built in between the two.

== History ==
Ta Kuan was built at La Spezia, Italy by Fincantieri and was launched in 1995. In 2015 she received a full upgrade from L3 Technologies.

== See also ==
- Italy-Taiwan relations
- Da Wu-class rescue and salvage ship
