= MTM217-class landing craft =

Landing Craft designed for carrying vehicles Of Italian Navy

Class overview
- Name: MTM217 class
- Builders: Cantiere Campanella (Savona)
- Operators: Italian Navy
- Preceded by: MTM544 class
- Succeeded by: LCM62 class
- In service: 1987–present
- Completed: 9
- Active: 9

General characteristics
- Type: Landing craft mechanized
- Displacement: 65 t (64 long tons) full load
- Length: 18.5 m (60 ft 8 in)
- Beam: 5.1 m (16 ft 9 in)
- Draught: 0.9 m (2 ft 11 in)
- Propulsion: 2 × shaft; 2 × Fiat-AIFO 8280 diesel engines, 412 kW (553 bhp)
- Speed: 9 knots (17 km/h; 10 mph) max
- Range: 300 nmi (560 km; 350 mi) at 9 kn (17 km/h; 10 mph)
- Capacity: 30 t (30 long tons)
- Complement: 3

The MTM217 class is a series of nine landing craft mechanized in service with the Italian Navy. The nine ships of the class were constructed in three waves to complement the three San Giorgio-class amphibious transport docks. The first three landing craft entered service in 1983, with successive waves of three in 1988 and 1993.

== Background ==
The MTM217 class is a landing craft designed to support amphibious military action. The vessels were designed for the transport of troops, light ground vehicles, or supplies from the San Giorgio-class amphibious transport docks, as part of landing operations along coasts. The San Giorgio class were designed to offer different functions for the Italian Navy and as such, the landing craft reflect that mission variability, able to transport up to 30 tonnes (30 long tons; 33 short tons) of cargo from ship to shore, launching from the San Giorgio-class ships via their well deck. MTM is short for Mototransorti Medi.

The hull construction material is glass-reinforced plastic and the landing craft have a standard displacement of 60 tonnes (59 long tons) and 65 tonnes (64 long tons) at full load. The MTM217 class measure 18.5 metres (60 ft 8 in) in length, with a beam of 5.1 metres (16 ft 9 in) and a draught of 0.9 metres (2 ft 11 in). The vessels are powered by two Fiat-AIFO 8280 diesel engines turning two shafts, creating 420 kilowatts (560 bhp) and giving them a maximum speed of 9 knots (17 km/h; 10 mph). They have a maximum range of 300 nautical miles (560 km; 350 mi) at 9 knots and a crew of three.

== Construction and career ==
The first three ships of the class were ordered for use aboard San Giorgio and were completed in 1987. The second batch of three were for San Marco and completed in 1988. Three more were ordered in March 1991 and completed in 1993 for San Giusto. Eight of these craft are used as reserve craft by San Marco Marine Brigade at Brindisi Naval Station homeport.

== Landing craft ==
Construction data for the MTM217 class
Name	Pennant number	Builder	Completed	Notes
MTM217	MEN217	Fincantieri, Muggiero, La Spezia	9 October 1987	LCM17
MTM218	MEN218	Fincantieri, Muggiero, La Spezia	9 October 1987	LCM18
MTM219	MEN219	Fincantieri, Muggiero, La Spezia	9 October 1987	LCM19
MTM220	MEN220	Fincantieri, Muggiero, La Spezia	8 March 1988	LCM20
MTM221	MEN221	Fincantieri, Muggiero, La Spezia	8 March 1988	LCM21
MTM222	MEN222	Fincantieri, Muggiero, La Spezia	8 March 1988	LCM22
MTM227	MEN227	Balzano shipyard	1993	LCM23
MTM228	MEN228	Balzano shipyard	1993	LCM24
MTM551	MEN551	Balzano shipyard	1993	
