= GO 20 =

History

Italy
- Name: GO 20
- Builder: Cantiere Navale di Castellammare di Stabia (Naples)
- Launched: 1935
- Commissioned: 1935
- In service: 1
- Home port: Brindisi
- Notes: Hull number, 211

General characteristics
- Type: Floating dry dock
- Notes: lifting capability 1.600 t (1.575 long tons)

GO 20 is a Floating dry dock of the Marina Militare.

== History ==
On 1992 based to Brindisi Naval Station
