= GO 11 =

History

Italy
- Name: GO 11
- Builder: Cantiere Navale di Castellammare di Stabia (Naples)
- Launched: August 1919
- Commissioned: 1920
- Home port: Taranto
- Notes: Hull number, 151

General characteristics
- Type: Floating dry dock
- Tonnage: 272 tonnes
- Length: 106.00 m (347 ft 9 in) LOA
- Notes: - lifting capability 2.700 t (2.657 long tons); - gross tonnage 272 t (268 long tons)

GO 11 is a floating dry dock of the Marina Militare.

== History ==
Based at Taranto Naval Station, in 2012.
