= RP 118-class tugboat =

Class overview
- Name: RP 118 class
- Builders: Cantiere Navale Nettuno di Baia, Bacoli (Naples)
- Operators: Italian Navy
- In commission: 1980/1984
- Building: 7
- Completed: 7
- Active: 6
- Retired: 1

General characteristics
- Type: Harbour tugboat
- Displacement: 85 t (84 long tons) full load
- Length: 19.8 m (65 ft) LOA
- Beam: 4.5 m (15 ft)
- Draught: 2.1 m (6.9 ft)
- Propulsion: - 1 x diesel engine FIAT AIFO 828-SM, 270 kW (360 hp); - 1 x diesel engine generator; - 1 x shaft; - 1 x (ducted) propeller
- Speed: 9.5 knots (17.6 km/h; 10.9 mph)
- Range: 400 nautical miles (740 km; 460 mi) at 9.5 knots (17.6 km/h; 10.9 mph)
- Crew: 3

The RP-118 class of Harbour tugboats consists of 7 units (the third batch) built for the Marina Militare, named as Rimorchiatore Portuale

== Ships ==
Italian Navy – RP 118 class / III batch
Name	Pennant number	Laid down	Launched	Commissioned	Decommissioned	Note
RP 118	Y 468	1980		1984		
RP 119	Y 470	1980		1984		
RP 120	Y 471	1980		1984		
RP 121	Y 472	1980		1984	Retired	
RP 122	Y 473	1980		1984		
RP 123	Y 476	1980		1984		
RP 124	Y 477	1980		1984		
