= Italian training vessel Stella Polare =

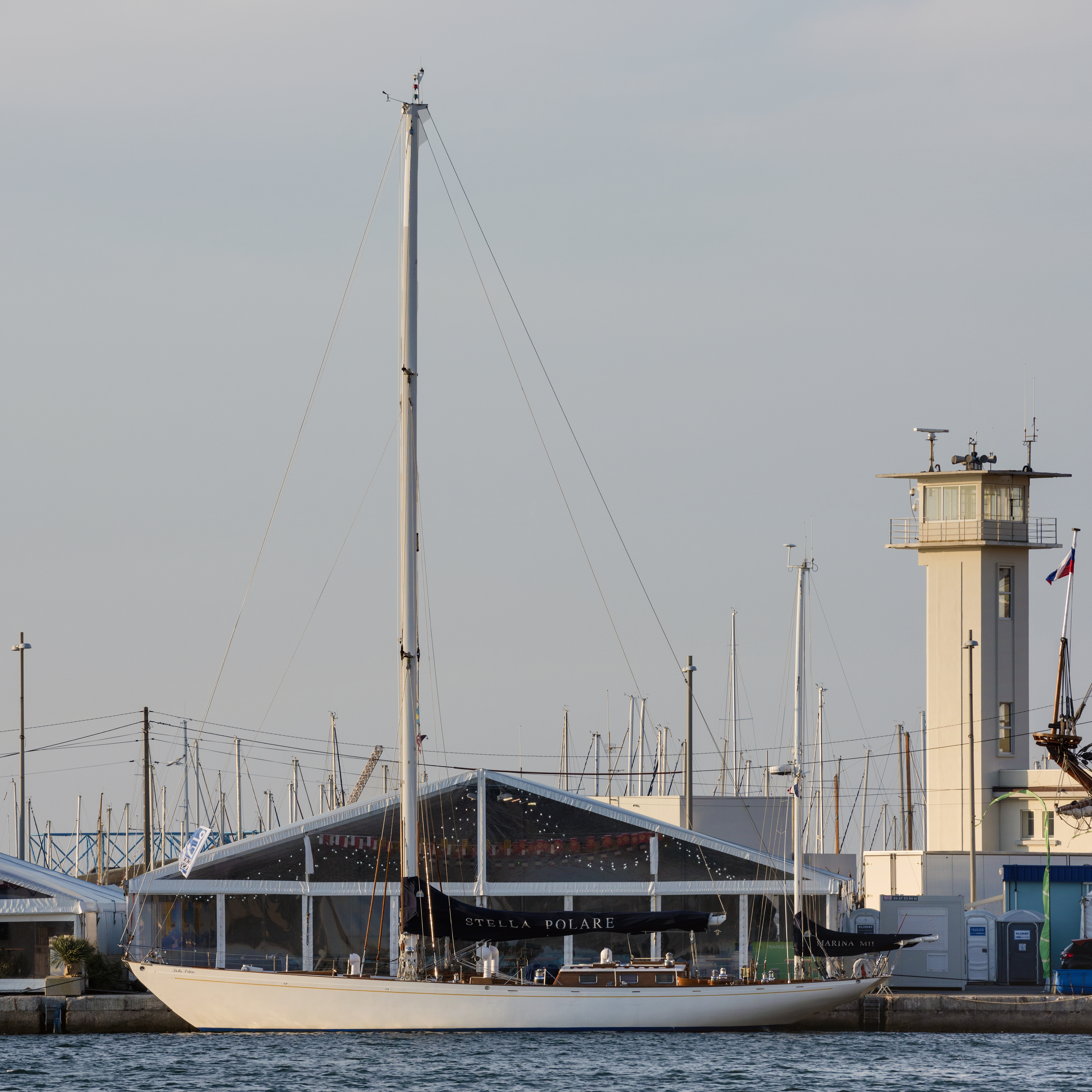
- Stella Polare at Sète, Hérault, France in 2016

History

Italy
- Name: Stella Polare
- Namesake: Stella Polare (Pole star ship)
- Builder: Cantiere Sangermani, Chiavari (Genova)
- Laid down: 1964
- Launched: 15 September 1965
- Commissioned: 8 October 1965
- Home port: La Spezia
- Identification: MMSI number: 912471184; Pennant number A 5313
- Status: In service

General characteristics
- Type: Yawl
- Tonnage: 48 t (47 long tons) full load
- Length: 21.47 m (70 ft 5 in) LOA; 15.24 m (50 ft 0 in) LPP
- Beam: 4.89 m (16 ft 1 in)
- Height: 24.08 m (79 ft 0 in) mainmast; 12.76 m (41 ft 10 in) mizzen mast
- Draught: 3.01 m (9 ft 11 in)
- Propulsion: 1 × diesel engine Fiat Aifo 101.4 kW (136.0 bhp); 1 x shaft; 1 x engine generator Onan 7 kW (9.4 bhp)
- Sail plan: Sail surface upwind: 205 m^{2} (2,210 sq ft); Sail surface: 488 m^{2} (5,250 sq ft)
- Speed: 7 knots (13 km/h; 8.1 mph) by engine prop
- Range: 500 nmi (930 km; 580 mi) at 7 knots (13 km/h; 8.1 mph) (on engine prop)
- Complement: 16

Stella Polare (A 5313) is a yawl, active as a sails training vessel for the Italian Navy (Marina Militare).

== History ==
Designed by Sparkman & Stephens Designs, New York, United States as project 1505.1, Stella Polare was built for the Royal Ocean Racing Club as a first class a Bermuda-rigged yawl, built in wood. The vessel is the sister ship of Corsaro II, and was commissioned by Italian Navy to be used as a training ship for the students of the Italian Naval Academy in Livorno.

The original engine, a General Motors 471 rated at 200 brake horsepower (150 kW) was replaced by a Fiat Aifo engine. The original Arona generator was replaced by an Onan model. Stella Polare is a training vessel for cadets of the Italian Naval Academy in Livorno, spending regular periods aboard. Each year she embarks on a training cruise which often includes calls to various classic sailing rallies and regattas.
