= Panarea-class tanker =

Marine Vessel

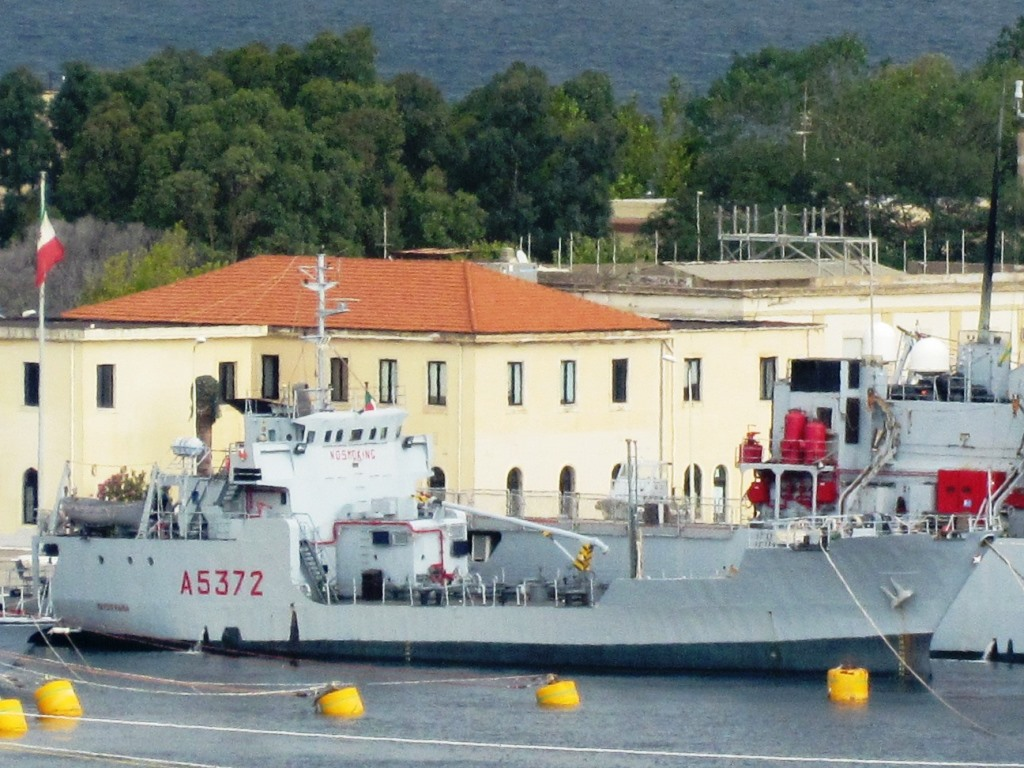
- Coastal oil tanker Favignana (A 5372), Messina, 2015

Class overview
- Name: Panarea class
- Builders: Cantieri Navali Ferrari (La Spezia)
- Operators: Italian Navy
- Planned: 4
- Building: 4
- Completed: 4
- Active: 4

General characteristics
- Type: Coastal oil tanker
- Displacement: 292 t (287 long tons), empty; 863 t (849 long tons), full load
- Length: 50.00 m (164 ft 1 in) LOA; 47.25 m (155 ft 0 in) LPP
- Beam: 10.00 m (32 ft 10 in)
- Draught: Favignana: 3.80 m (12 ft 6 in); Linosa, Panarea and Salina; 3.20 m (10 ft 6 in)
- Propulsion: 2 x shaft; Favignana: 2 x diesel engines Caterpillar C18, 484.71 kW (650.01 bhp) each; 2 x diesel generators ANSALDO mod. M2BM 315 SA/4; Linosa, Panarea and Salina: 2 x diesel engines Isotta Fraschini ID-36-SS-6V, 587 kW (787 bhp) each; 2 x diesel generators Isotta Fraschini VM1312-MH-14
- Speed: Favignana: 11 knots (20 km/h; 13 mph); Linosa, Panarea and Salina: 12 knots (22 km/h; 14 mph)
- Range: 1,500 nmi (2,800 km; 1,700 mi)
- Capacity: 570 m^{3} (20,000 cu ft) NATO F76 (diesel fuel marine); or 581 m^{3} (20,500 cu ft) NATO F44/JP5 (aviation fuel); equivalent to 550 t (540 long tons)
- Crew: 16
- Sensors & processing systems: 2 × GEM Elettronica MM/SPN-753 navigation radar

The Panarea class is a series of four coastal oil tankers of the Italian Navy designated as Moto Cisterna Costiera, MCC (NATO YOG). Since 5 October 2005 all vessels carry the motto Prompti ad Agendum.

== Ships ==
Italian Navy - Panarea class
Ship	Pennant number	Laid down	Launched	Commissioned	Notes	Initial number	Wikimedia Commons
Favignana	A 5372	10 July 1985	8 February 1986	17 May 1987	for NATO; F44/JP5 aviation fuel	MCC-1103	
Linosa	A 5371		16 November 1985	6 December 1986	for NATO; F76 marine oil	MCC-1102	
Panarea	A 5370		26 October 1985	26 August 1986	for NATO; F76 marine oil	MCC-1101	
Salina	A 5373	1987	14 November 1987	20 May 1988	for NATO; F44/JP5 aviation fuel	MCC-1104	
