= Rossetti-class research vessel =

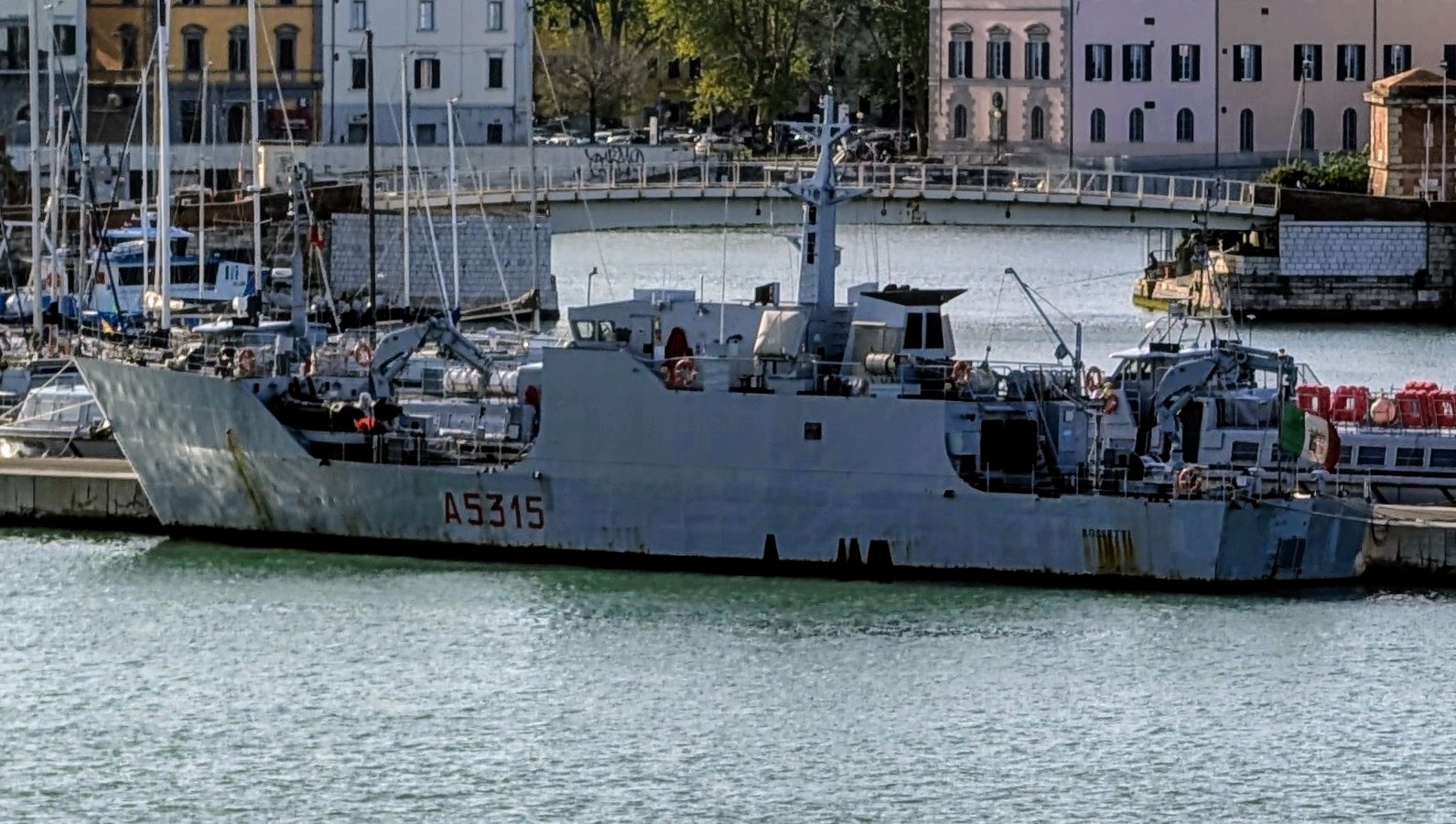

Class overview
- Name: Rossetti class
- Builders: Cantiere Navale Picchiotti, Viareggio (Livorno)
- Operators: Italian Navy
- In commission: 1986–1989
- Planned: 2
- Completed: 2
- Active: 2

General characteristics
- Type: Coastal research vessel
- Displacement: 324/330 tonnes, full load
- Length: 44.6 m (146 ft)
- Beam: 7.9 m (26 ft)
- Draught: 2.0 m (6.6 ft)
- Propulsion: - 2 x Diesel engines Isotta Fraschini ID-36-SS-16V (440 kW (590 hp) each); - 2 x Diesel engines generators Isotta Fraschini ID-36-N-6V with alternator Ansaldo M5R; - Vincenzo Martellotta added another diesel engine generator silenced with alternator Magneti Marelli MKM 250
- Speed: 12 knots (22 km/h; 14 mph)
- Range: 1,700 nautical miles (3,100 km; 2,000 mi)
- Crew: - 17, of which: - 2 officials; - 15 sailors
- Sensors & processing systems: 2 x GEM Elettronica SPN-753 navigation radar, X band

The Rossetti class of coastal research vessels consists of two units operated by the Italian Navy and named as "Nave Esperienze" (experiences ship). The vessels are used by Centro Supporto Sperimentazioni Navali (Naval Experimentation Support Centre) for technology research and development trials on anti-submarine weapons.

== Features ==
Specifically designed for experiments, new technologies tests in relation to weapon and platform systems, the unit is mainly operated by the Permanent Commission for Experiments on War Materials at La Spezia.

- Raffaele Rossetti (A 5315) is fitted with WASS 533 mm torpedo launcher.
- Vincenzo Martellotta (A 5320) is fitted with WASS B515/3 324 mm torpedo launcher.

== Ships ==
Italian Navy - Rossetti class
Name	Pennant number	Displacement full load	Laid down	Launched	Commissioned	Motto
Raffaele; Rossetti	A 5315	324 tonnes		12 July 1986	20 December 1986	Fortior in asperis
Vincenzo; Martellotta	A 5320	330 tonnes	1987	1988	December 1989	Rerum cognoscere causas
