= Italian ship Cheradi =

History

Italy
- Name: Cheradi
- Namesake: Cheradi
- Builder: Ortona Navi International Ortona (Chieti)
- Laid down: 1991
- Commissioned: 1992
- In service: 1
- Home port: Taranto
- Identification: Pennant number: Y 402
- Status: Active
- Notes: Hull number, 28/90

General characteristics
- Type: Ferry-boat
- Displacement: 180 t (180 long tons) full load
- Length: 50 m (164 ft 1 in) LOA.
- Notes: fitted with Pellegrini crane GN 1.5/7

Cheradi (Y 402) is a Ferry-boat of the Italian Navy in service in Taranto Naval Base area
