= RP 113-class tugboat =

Class overview
- Name: RP 113 class
- Builders: Cantiere Navale Vittoria Adria (Rovigo)
- Operators: Italian Navy
- Planned: 4
- Building: 4
- Completed: 4
- Active: 2
- Retired: 2

General characteristics
- Type: Harbour tugboat
- Displacement: 120 t (120 long tons) full load
- Length: 19.8 m (65 ft) LOA
- Beam: 5.2 m (17 ft)
- Draught: 2.4 m (7.9 ft)
- Propulsion: - 1 x diesel engine FIAT AIFO 828-SM, 270 kW (360 hp); - 1 x diesel engine generator; - 1 x shaft; - 1 x (ducted) propeller
- Speed: 9.5 knots (17.6 km/h; 10.9 mph)
- Range: 400 nautical miles (740 km; 460 mi) at 9.5 knots (17.6 km/h; 10.9 mph)
- Crew: 3

The RP-113 class of Harbour tugboats consists of 4 units (II batch) built for the Marina Militare, named as Rimorchiatore Portuale

== Ships ==
Italian Navy – RP 113 class / II batch
Name	Pennant number	Laid down	Launched	Commissioned	Decommissioned	Note
RP 113	Y 463		1980	14 April 1980		
RP 114	Y 464		1980	14 April 1980	31 December 2012	
RP 115	Y 465		1980	1980	Retired	
RP 116	Y 466		1980	1980		
