= Italian training ship Orsa Maggiore =

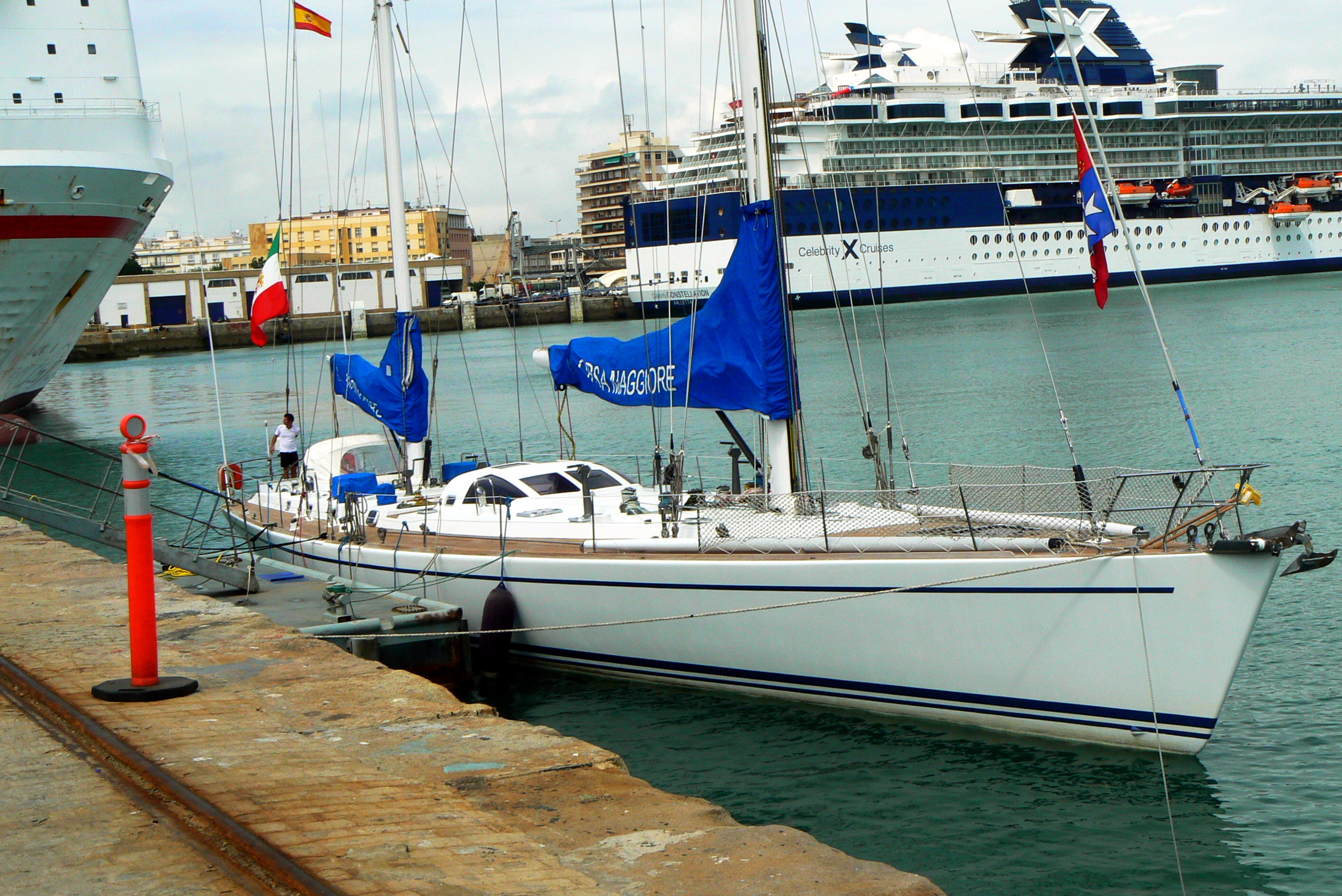
- Orsa Maggiore at Cádiz, Spain in 2008

History

Italy
- Name: Orsa Maggiore
- Operator: Italian Navy
- Builder: Cantiere Navale Tencara Porto Marghera, Venice, Italy
- Laid down: November 1993
- Launched: November 1994
- Commissioned: 28 November 1995
- In service: 1
- Home port: La Spezia
- Identification: MMSI number: 247938000; Callsign: IAOM; Pennant number A5323
- Motto: Ad maiora duco
- Status: in service

General characteristics
- Type: ketch
- Tonnage: 80 t (79 long tons) full load
- Length: 28.3 m (92 ft 10 in) LOA
- Beam: 6.5 m (21 ft 4 in)
- Draught: 4.5 m (14 ft 9 in)
- Propulsion: - 1 x diesel engine Fiat Aifo 8361, 268.45 kW (360.00 bhp); - 1 x shaft; - 1 x diesel engine generator, 13.5 kW (18.1 bhp)
- Sail plan: - Sail surface 802 square metres (8,630 square feet); - Sail surface upwind 387 square metres (4,170 square feet)
- Speed: 8.0 knots (14.8 km/h; 9.2 mph)
- Endurance: 2,200 nmi (4,100 km; 2,500 mi) on 7.0 knots (13.0 km/h; 8.1 mph) (with engine prop)
- Complement: 22
- Sensors & processing systems: navigation radar, GPS, Inmarsat

Orsa Maggiore is an ocean ketch, serving as a sail training vessel for the Italian Navy. It is an oceanic yacht racing armed as ketch of the Italian Navy's sail section.

== History ==
Designed by Andrea Vallicelli, it was built using composite of carbon sandwich, kevlar and fiberglass, which made the structure of the hull lighter and simultaneously much more resistant than older wooden hulls. The design was considered innovative for its time.

The ship has been commissioned directly by the Italian Navy in order to have a hull that would give preference all the features to ensure maximum safety at sea in all global weather and sea conditions.
