= Italian training ship Caroly =

History
- Name: Caroly
- Namesake: Carolina (name)
- Operator: Italian Navy
- Builder: Cantiere Navale Baglietto, Varazze, La Spezia, Italy
- Launched: 18 July 1948
- Recommissioned: 1983
- In service: 1
- Status: in service
- Notes: Pennant number A5302

General characteristics
- Type: Yawl
- Tonnage: 56 t (55 long tons) full load
- Length: 23.66 m (77 ft 7 in) LOA; 17.67 m (58.0 ft) LPP
- Beam: 4.80 m (15 ft 9 in)
- Draught: 2.80 m (9 ft 2 in)
- Propulsion: 1 x diesel engine FIAT AIFO 8061M, 82.03 kW (110.00 bhp); 1 x shaft; 1 x engine generator Onan Marine 120 MDKAD
- Sail plan: 210 m^{2} (2,300 sq ft)
- Speed: - 9.0 knots (16.7 km/h; 10.4 mph) by sailing; - 8.0 knots (14.8 km/h; 9.2 mph) by engine prop
- Range: 550 nmi (1,020 km; 630 mi) at 8.0 knots (14.8 km/h; 9.2 mph) (on engine prop)
- Complement: - 14, of which: - 5 crew; - 9 guests

Caroly is a yawl, active as a sail training vessel for the Italian Navy.

== History ==
Designed by Vincenzo Vittorio Baglietto, Caroly is a Bermudan-rig yawl, built in wood, commissioned by Riccardo Preve in 1948 and named after his wife Carolina. The Ligurian family continued to own Caroly up until 1982, where she was then donated to the Marina Militare to be used as a training ship for the students of the Italian Naval Academy of Livorno. In restored years 1998/1999.
