= GGS 1012-class tanker =

Class overview
- Name: GGS 1012
- Builders: Cantiere Navale De Poli Pellestrina (Venezia)
- Operators: Italian Navy
- In commission: 1990/1991
- Planned: 7
- Completed: 7
- Active: 7

General characteristics
- Type: Harbour Transport ship
- Displacement: 500 t (490 long tons) full load
- Length: 39.1 m (128 ft 3 in) LOA
- Beam: 8.5 m (27 ft 11 in)
- Draught: 3.10 m (10 ft 2 in)
- Installed power: 500 kW (670 bhp)
- Propulsion: 2 x diesel engines
- Speed: 11 knots (20 km/h; 13 mph)
- Sensors & processing systems: 1 x navigation radar

The GGS-1012 class is a series of seven harbour oil and water Transport ships of the Italian Navy.

== Ships ==
Italian Navy - GGS 1012 class
Name Pennant number	Hull number	Launched	Commissioned	Notes
GGS 1012	131	1988	1990/1991	water tanker
GGS 1013	132	1988	1990/1991	water tanker
GGS 1014	133	1988	1990/1991	water tanker
GRS/G 1010	134	1988	1990/1991	gasoline tanker
GRS/G 1011	135	1988	1990/1991	gasoline tanker
GRS/G 1012	136	1988	1990/1991	gasoline tanker
GRS/J 1013	137	1988	1990/1991	oil tanker
