= Italian training ship Capricia =

Italian Navy training vessel

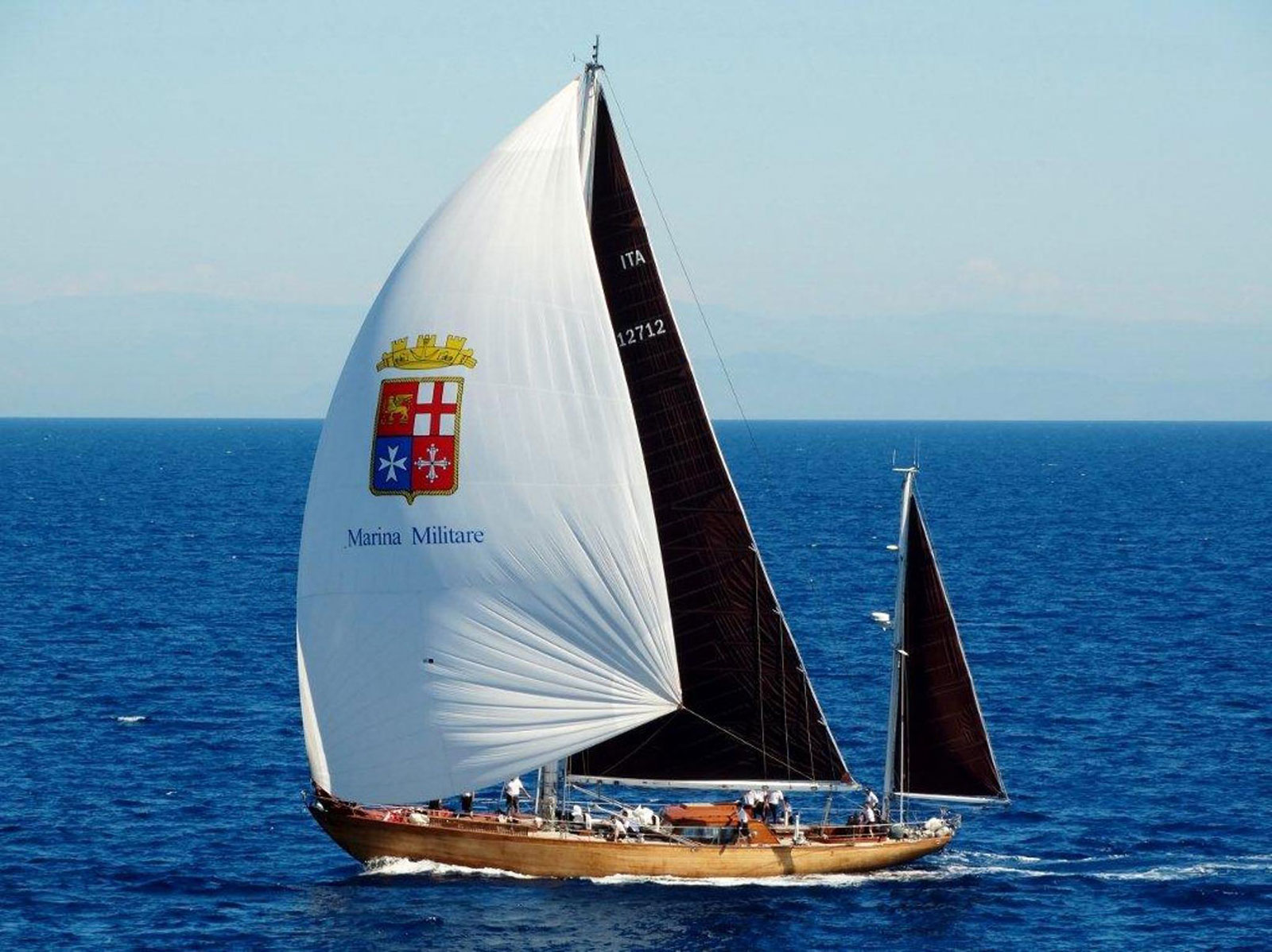
- Capricia in 2007

History
- Name: Capricia
- Operator: Italian Navy
- Builder: Bengt Plym on A/B Neglinge-Varvet shipyard of Saltsjöbaden, Sweden
- Launched: October 1963
- Commissioned: 1963
- Recommissioned: January 1993
- In service: 1
- Home port: La Spezia
- Identification: ITA 12712
- Motto: Nulla nos via tardat eunte
- Status: in service
- Notes: Pennant number A5322

General characteristics
- Type: Yawl
- Tonnage: 55 t (54 long tons) full load
- Length: - 22.55 m (74 ft 0 in) LOA; - 16.46 m (54.0 ft) LPP
- Beam: 5.06 m (16 ft 7 in)
- Draught: 3.14 m (10 ft 4 in)
- Propulsion: 1 x diesel engine General Motors 120.0 kW (160.9 bhp); 1 shaft; 1 x engine generator
- Sail plan: 254 m^{2} (2,730 sq ft)
- Speed: 6.0 knots (11.1 km/h; 6.9 mph) by engine prop
- Range: 1.000 nmi (1.852 km; 1.151 mi) at 6.0 knots (11.1 km/h; 6.9 mph) (on engine prop)
- Complement: - 14, of which: - 5 crew; - 9 guests

Capricia is a yawl, active as a sail training vessel for the Italian Navy

== History ==
The Bermudian yawl Capricia was built by Bengt Plym shipyard in Sweden, on a project by Sparkman & Stephens New York City (United States) (number 1645), the world-famous yacht design firm.

The vessel is entirely made of wood: white oak for the structure, mahogany for the planking, teak for the deck, Canadian spruce for the masts.

The original owner was Einar Hansen, Malmö, Sweden.

Capricia has a copal-varnished hull and brick red sails that make her instantly recognisable. Having won the Fastnet in 1965, she was purchased by Fiat boss Gianni Agnelli who held on to her until 1993 when he donated her to the Italian Navy.

The Agnelli family bought it in 1971 and the boat went through a thorough renovation of the interior, which included the creation of an unusual bathroom with a large bathtub. The latter used Capricia as a training vessel, with cadets from the Italian Naval Academy in Livorno spending regular periods aboard. Each year she embarks on a training cruise which often includes calls to various classic sailing rallies and regattas.
