= RP 125-class tugboat =

Class overview
- Name: RP 125 class
- Builders: - Cantiere Navale Vittoria Adria (Rovigo); - Cantiere Navale Ferrari La Spezia; - Cantiere Navale CINET Molfetta (Bari)
- Operators: Italian Navy
- In commission: 1983/1984
- Building: 10
- Completed: 10
- Active: 10

General characteristics
- Type: Harbour tugboat
- Displacement: 76.4 t (75.2 long tons) full load
- Length: 19.9 m (65 ft) LOA
- Beam: 5.2 m (17 ft)
- Draught: 2.4 m (7.9 ft)
- Propulsion: - 1 x diesel engine FIAT AIFO 828-SM, 270 kW (360 hp); - 1 x diesel engine generator; - 1 x shaft; - 1 x (ducted) propeller
- Speed: 9.5 knots (17.6 km/h; 10.9 mph)
- Range: 400 nautical miles (740 km; 460 mi) at 9.5 knots (17.6 km/h; 10.9 mph)
- Crew: 3

The RP-125 class of Harbour tugboats consists of 10 units (the fourth batch) built for the Marina Militare, named as Rimorchiatore Portuale

== Ships ==
Italian Navy - RP 125 class / IV batch
Name	Pennant number	Shipyard	Laid down	Launched	Commissioned	Decommissioned	Note
RP 125	Y 478	Cantiere Navale Vittoria Adria (Rovigo)			1983		
RP 126	Y 479	Cantiere Navale Vittoria Adria (Rovigo)			1983		
RP 127	Y 480	Cantiere Navale Ferrari La Spezia			1984		
RP 128	Y 481	Cantiere Navale Ferrari La Spezia			1984		
RP 129	Y 482	Cantiere Navale Ferrari La Spezia			1984		
RP 130	Y 483	Cantiere Navale Ferrari La Spezia			1984		
RP 131	Y 484	Cantiere Navale Ferrari La Spezia			1984		
RP 134	Y 487	Cantiere Navale Ferrari La Spezia			1984		
RP 132	Y 485	Cantiere Navale CINET Molfetta (Bari)			1984		
RP 133	Y 486	Cantiere Navale CINET Molfetta (Bari)			1984		
