= GO 22-class floating dock =

Class overview
- Name: GO 22
- Operators: Italian Navy
- In commission: 1935
- Planned: 2
- Building: 2
- Completed: 2
- Active: 1

General characteristics
- Type: Floating dry dock
- Length: 90.0 m (295 ft 3 in)
- Beam: 12 m (39 ft 4 in)
- Propulsion: - none; - 1 x diesel engine generator
- Notes: lifting capacity 1.000 t (0.984 long tons)

The GO 22 class is a series of two Floating dry docks of the Marina Militare.

== Ships ==
Italian Navy – GO 22 class
Pennant number	Hull number	Laid down	Launched	Commissioned	Decommissioned	Notes
GO 22				1935	2011	assigned to Augusta Naval station
GO 23				1935		assigned to Augusta Naval station
