= GO 55-class floating dock =

Class overview
- Name: GO 55
- Builders: Cantiere Navale Giacalone Mazara del Vallo (Trapani)
- Operators: Italian Navy
- In commission: 1996
- Planned: 3
- Building: 3
- Completed: 3
- Active: 3

General characteristics
- Type: Floating dry dock
- Length: 70.0 m (229 ft 8 in)
- Beam: 13.7 m (44 ft 11 in)
- Notes: lifting capacity 850 t (840 long tons)

The GO 55 class is a series of three floating dry docks of the Marina Militare.
It's fitted with Pellegrini crane GP 3/12/T/H (3.000 kg to 12 m).

== Ships ==
Italian Navy - GO 55 class
| Pennant number | Hull number | Laid down | Launched | Commissioned | Notes |
|---|---|---|---|---|---|
| GO 55 | 80 | 1994 | 1995 | 1996 | Messina |
| GO 56 | 90 | 1994 | | 1996 | Brindisi |
| GO 57 | 91 | 1994 | | 1996 | La Spezia |
