= Italian ship Alliance =

NATO research ship built in 1988

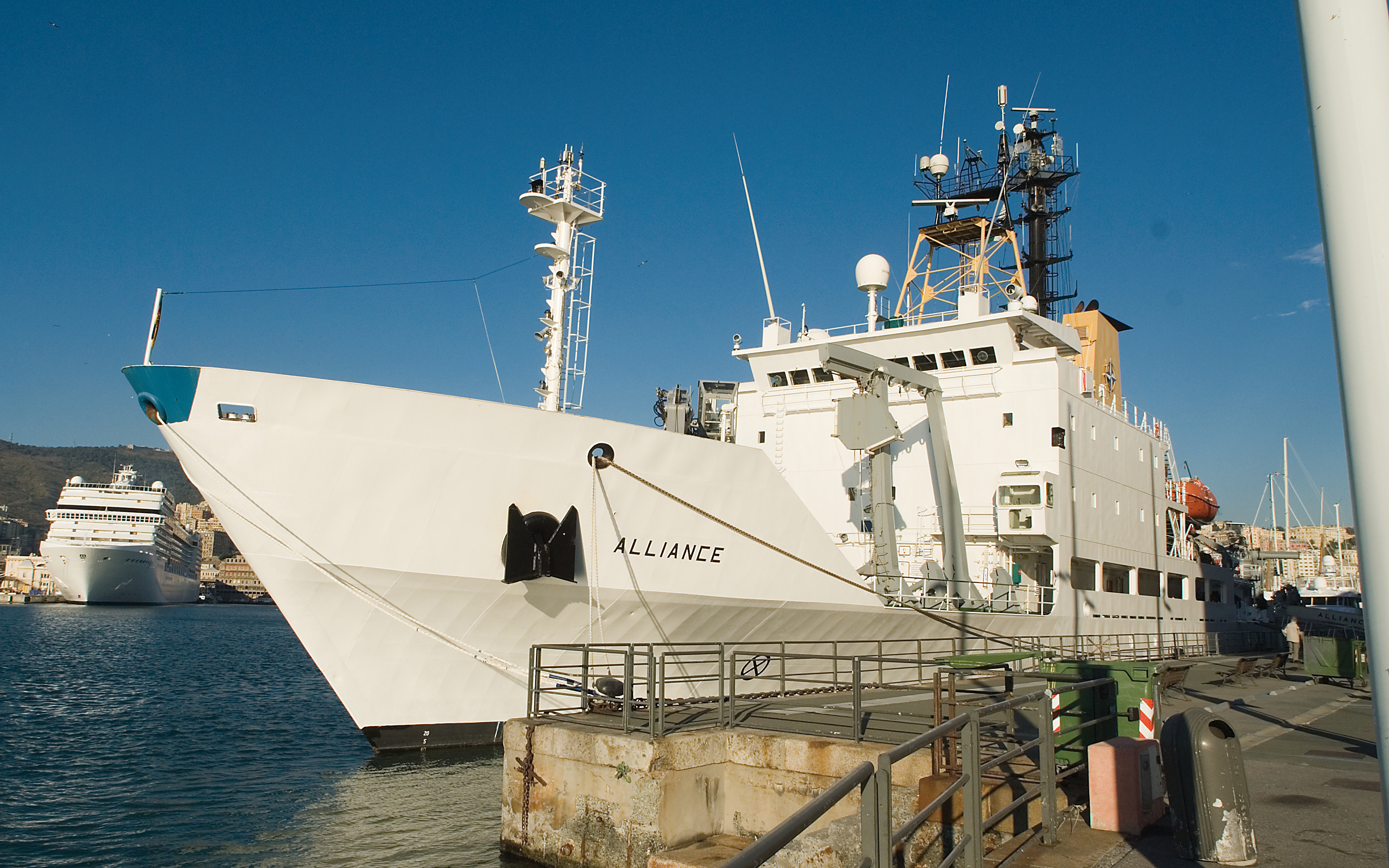
- Alliance at La Spezia

History

Italy
- Name: Alliance
- Owner: NATO
- Builder: Fincantieri – Cantiere Navale del Muggiano (La Spezia)
- Laid down: 18 June 1984
- Launched: 9 July 1986
- Commissioned: 15 April 1988 Germany; 31 March 2016 Italy
- Home port: La Spezia
- Identification: Pennant number: A 5345; Hull number: 921; MMSI number: 247366500; Callsign: IALL
- Status: Active

General characteristics
- Type: Research vessel
- Tonnage: 3,180 GT; 960 NT
- Displacement: 2.920 t (2.874 long tons) full load; 2.466 t (2.427 long tons) standard
- Length: 93 m (305 ft 1 in) LOA; 82 m (269 ft 0 in) LPP
- Beam: 15.2 m (49 ft 10 in) (molded)
- Draught: 6.2 m (20 ft 4 in) full load
- Propulsion: Main diesel driven propulsion generators, 1,800 kW (2,400 bhp); auxiliary gas turbine driven propulsion generator, 967 kW (1,297 bhp)/400 kW (540 bhp); main generators: 2 x diesel engines Grandi Motori Trieste GMT B-230.12, silenced, 1,890 kW (2,530 bhp) each; 2 x main generators [AEG] Type DKBL 634/06 1,799 kW (2,412 bhp); auxiliary generators: 1 x TAG Kongsberg KG2-3C, 1,430 kW (1,920 bhp); 1 x auxiliary generator AEG Type DKBH 4504/04, dual rated 967 kW (1,297 bhp)/400 kW (540 bhp); electric propulsion engines: 2 x electric engines MEP SAM Electronic (ex-AEG) GC312/128/8 KZ 90/24, 1,470 kW (1,970 bhp); ship service engines: 3 x diesel engine generators Isotta Fraschini ID36-SS-6V (silenced), 480 kW (640 bhp) each; 2 x propeller; 1 x bow thruster
- Speed: 16.3 knots (30.2 km/h; 18.8 mph) (sustained speed)
- Range: 9,450 nmi (17,500 km; 10,870 mi) at 11.5 knots (21.3 km/h; 13.2 mph) (Fuel consumption = approx. 8 tons per 24 hours of economical steaming at 16.3 knots (30.2 km/h; 18.8 mph). 5 tons per 24 hours of low speed scientific operations)
- Endurance: 30 days, port to port
- Complement: 69, of which: 44 crew, of which 5 officials (accommodations in 5 single suites, 1 single cabin and 19 double cabins); 25 scientists (accommodations in 1 single suite, 16 single cabins and 4 double cabins)
- Sensors & processing systems: 2 x navigation radar Kelvin Hughes Nucleus 6000 (X and S band); Kongsberg K-Bridge INBS; Kongsberg MDM 400 Marine Data Management system; [ELAC SONAR] Echo sounder LAZ5100
- Notes: fuel capacity: 315 m3; fresh water capacity: 100 t (98 long tons); 4 x cranes: 2 each of 5t SWL with 13m outreach, 2 each of 2t SWL of 10m outreach; 2 x ‘A-frames, 1 forward 16t SWL, 1 aft 10t SWL (50t snap load); 2 x towing winches – 20t @ 12 knots; 2 x diesel jet drive rigid inflatable workboats (RHIB): Delta/Yanmar TD 730 hp (540 kW) and MST/Volvo Delta TD 190 hp (140 kW)

Alliance (A5345) is a research vessel owned by NATO and operated by the Marina Militare as a NATO research vessel and owned by the CMRE – Centre for Maritime Research and Experimentation, in La Spezia, Italy. Alliance has the status of an auxiliary ship of the Marina Militare.

The function of the Alliance is to conduct a wide range of acoustic, oceanographic research and engineering technology tasks on behalf of NATO, Marina Militare and third party organizations when 'on hire' for charters in global waters. The design and construction of the vessel was done to create a versatile research platform that is adaptable to the Centre's needs and reduce noise output to the lowest possible level in order to minimize interference with research work.

== History ==
Commissioned on 15 April 1988 to SACLANT (Undersea Research Centre – SACLANTCEN, then named NATO Underwater Research Centre – NURC and now CMRE – Centre for Maritime Research and Experimentation) of La Spezia, under the German flag.

Alliance was transferred to the Italian naval flag on 9 April 2016. The vessel is crewed and operated on behalf of NATO by the Marina Militare under a Memorandum of Understanding signed on 22 December 2015.

It took part in Nordic Recognized Environmental Picture research mission, a multi-year oceanographic research project that started in 2017 and has been conducted in different parts of the Arctic Ocean. The mission assess the impact of climate change in the Arctic, in particular, how the transformation of the Arctic affects sonar performance.

== General information ==
- primary working area (aft): 200 m^{2} (2,200 sq ft)
- secondary working area (forward): 200 m^{2} (2,200 sq ft)
- maintenance, support and all Labs: 370 m^{2} (4,000 sq ft)
- scientific storage areas: 500 m3
- capacity to embark up to 5 standard ISO1C, 20 ft (6.1 m), and up to 3 standard ISO 1D, 10 ft (3.0 m), containers

== Sensing devices ==
- multibeam echo sounder Kongsberg SIMRAD EM-302, 30 kHz
- echo sounder Atlas Deso 30, 33 kHz
- echo sounder Atlas deso 25, 210 kHz
- echo sounder FWC, 100 kHz
- SMS Sound Velocity Probe C Sonde SVP 10
- acoustic tracking system
- E.M. Speed Log Skipper DL850, 270 kHz
- Acoustic Range and Bearing Indicator, 9–11 kHz
- Acoustic Doppler Current Profiler (ADCP) RDI, 75 kHz
- Conductivity/temperature sensor Sea Bird, 8–12 kHz
- Underwater telephone ELAC LAZ5100, 8-11.5 kHz

== Communication systems ==
There are two independent systems for ship communications and for scientific trials (with some overlap). The ship system, which uses radios complying with SOLAS and GMDSS rules, includes Inmarsat systems (e-mail, fax and phone).

- 2 x Elmer ST-1075, 1000 watt HF transmitter
- 2 x Elmer ST-675, 600 watt HF transmitter
- 2 x Elmer SRT-619, UHF transceiver
- Sailor RT144C, VHF transceiver
- Furuno FM-2510, VHF transceiver
- Kelvin Hughes Band V-Sat SATCOM, Satellite Communication System

== See also ==
- Italian ship Elettra (A 5340)
- ROCS Ta Kuan (AGS-1601)
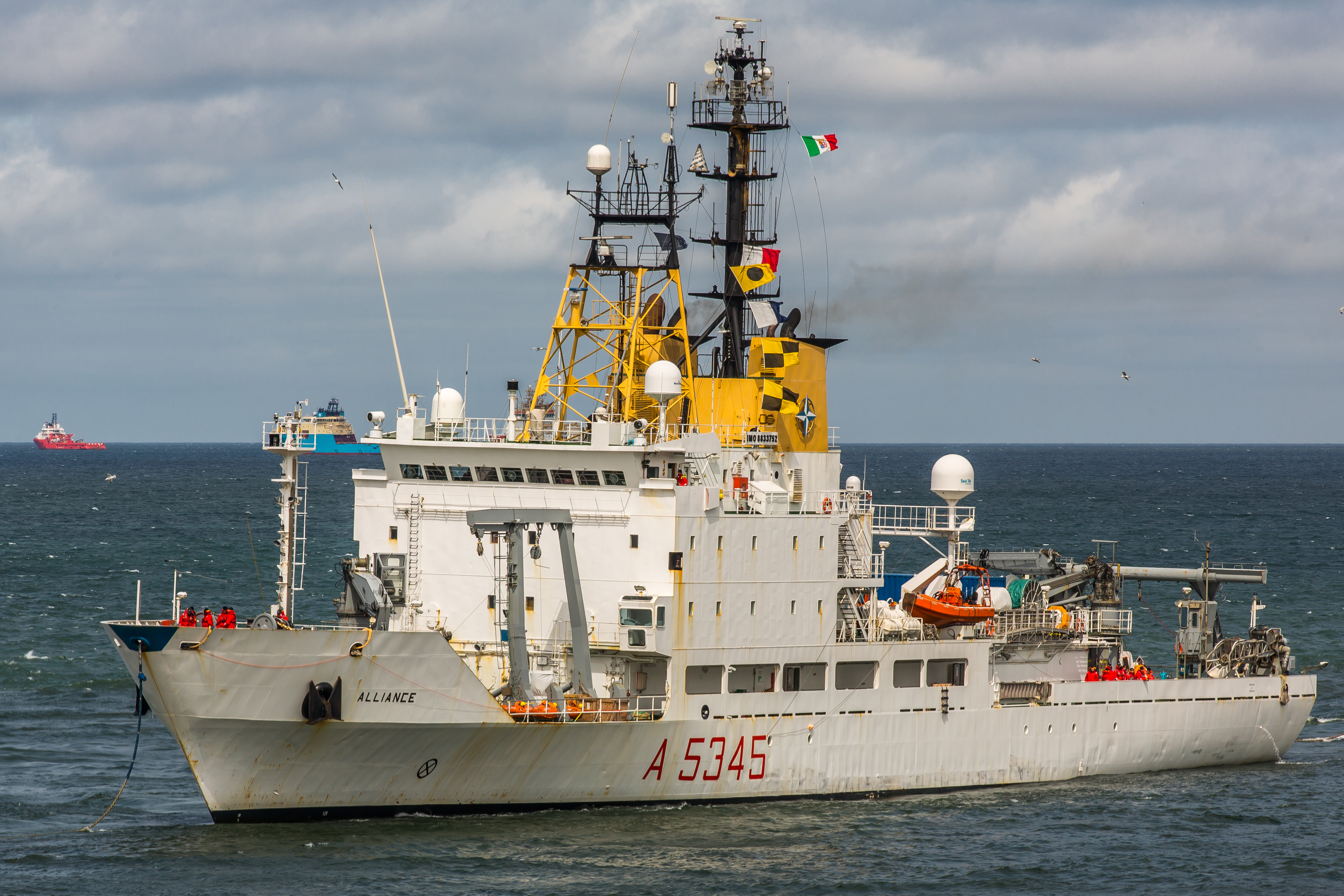
Research vessel Alliance operated by Marina Militare
