= LxD-class amphibious warfare ship =

Italian amphibious warfare vessel

Class overview
- Builders: Fincantieri
- Operators: Italian Navy
- Preceded by: San Giorgio class
- Cost: €1.2 billion (2023) for 2 ships
- Planned: 2 (+1)

General characteristics
- Type: Amphibious warfare ship
- Displacement: 16,500 t (16,200 long tons) full load
- Length: 160 m (524 ft 11 in)
- Beam: 29 m (95 ft 2 in)
- Speed: 20 knots (37 km/h; 23 mph)
- Range: 7,000 nautical miles (13,000 km; 8,100 mi)
- Boats & landing craft carried: 2* LC23-class landing craft
- Troops: 360
- Crew: 200
- Sensors & processing systems: 1 x Leonardo Kronos Power Shield, AESA LRR L-band radar
- Aircraft carried: NH90 or EH-101

The LxD is an initiative by the Italian Navy to procure a series of two amphibious warfare ships (with the option for a third vessel) as a replacement for the aging San Giorgio class.

== History ==
The Italian Navy received the approval in 2010 to procure two 20,000-ton 190-metre (623 ft 4 in) long amphibious assault ships (landing helicopter dock), with the possibility of a third ship, configured with extensive aviation facilities (landing helicopter assault).

In more recent designs the ships are shown as 16,500-ton 160-metre (520 ft) landing platform docks with two helicopter landing spots on the aft deck. The first two ships are expected to enter service from 2028 to 2030. If the option is taken, the third ship will enter service after 2031.
