= GO 52-class floating dock =

Class overview
- Name: GO 52
- Builders: Cantiere Navale Ferrari La Spezia
- Operators: Italian Navy
- In commission: 1988/1993
- Planned: 3
- Building: 3
- Completed: 3
- Active: 3

General characteristics
- Type: Floating dry dock
- Length: - 152.40 m (500 ft 0 in) LOA; - working length = 140.40 m (460 ft 8 in)
- Beam: - 29.6 m (97 ft 1 in); - working beam = 21.6 m (70 ft 10 in)
- Height: 12.40 m (40 ft 8 in)
- Draft: 14.70 m (48 ft 3 in) (max)
- Notes: lifting capacity 6.000 t (5.905 long tons)

The GO 52 class is a series of three floating dry docks of the Marina Militare.

== Ships ==
Italian Navy - GO 52 class
Pennant number	Hull number	Laid down	Launched	Commissioned	Notes
GO 52				1990	Taranto
GO 53	75	1989		1989/1993	Augusta
GO 54	105	1990		1993	Taranto
