= Italian ship Elettra =

Naval signals intelligence vessel

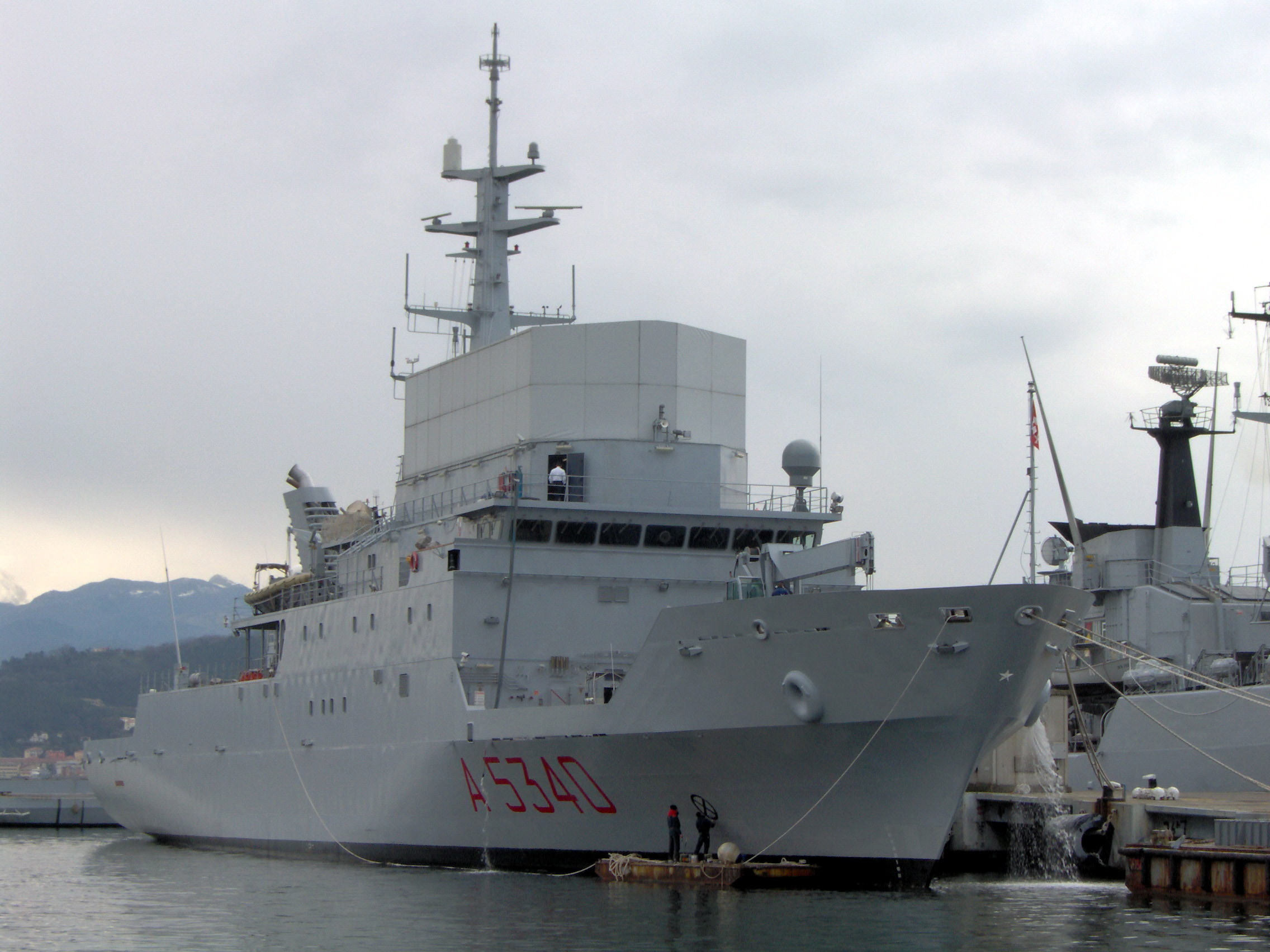
- Elettra A 5340, October 2013, La Spezia

History

Italy
- Name: Elettra
- Ordered: 1999
- Builder: Fincantieri - Cantiere Navale del Muggiano (La Spezia)
- Cost: € (EUR) 139 million (2006)
- Laid down: 20 January 2001
- Launched: 24 July 2002
- Commissioned: 2 April 2003
- Home port: La Spezia
- Identification: Pennant number: A 5340
- Motto: Anima i silenzi aerei
- Status: Active as of 2018

General characteristics
- Type: Auxiliary ship
- Displacement: 3,180 tonnes (full-load).; 2,466 tonnes (empty)
- Length: 93.5 m (306 ft 9 in)
- Beam: 15.5 m (50 ft 10 in)
- Draught: 4.83 m (15 ft 10 in)
- Propulsion: 2 x diesel-generators engines GMT-Wärtsilä CW 12V200 (2.200 kW each); 2 x permanent magnetic electric engines ABB (1.500 kW each); 2 x diesel-generators auxiliary engines Isotta Fraschini IF V1708T2 (770 kW each); 1 x emergency diesel-generator; 2 x propeller; 1 x bow thruster
- Speed: 16.5 knots (30.6 km/h; 19.0 mph)
- Range: 8,000 nmi (15,000 km; 9,200 mi) at 12 knots (22 km/h; 14 mph)
- Complement: 30 crew; 65 electronic technicians
- Sensors & processing systems: 2 x navigation radar Kelvin Hughes Nucleus 6000 (X band); EM Ship log; 3-band satellite terminal
- Armament: 2 × OTO Melara KBA 25/80 mm
- Notes: flight deck only for RPV; FLUME Passive stabilisation plant; 1 x 180 t/m crane; 1 x 55 t/m crane; 2 x cranes for service boats

Elettra (A 5340) is an Italian Navy SIGINT vessel designated as 'Nuova Unità Polivalente di Supporto (NUPS). Designed to carry out research and surveillance activities, the vessel's platform was developed from the RV Alliance built for NATO. Her propulsion system, based on two permanent magnet electric engines, constitutes a technological breakthrough and she is the first surface vessel in the world to be powered by this type of engine. The main characteristics of this propulsion system are: high reliability, high efficiency, low maintenance and low underwater radiated noise

== Characteristics ==
The vessel is fitted with:

- advanced electronic intelligence gear, including 27 various electronic and acoustic reconnaissance systems
- submersible ROV, which can operate at a maximum depth of 1,000 meters
- an echo sounder
- a rear flight deck can deploy unmanned aerial vehicles
- 1 x compression chamber DRASS Galeazzi for 8 persons

== Ships ==
	Pennant number	Hull number	Owner	Laid Down	Launched	Commissioned	Motto	Note
Italian ship Alliance (A 5345)	A 5345	921	NATO operated by Italian Navy	18 July 1984	9 July 1986	6 May 1988		about 50 Billion Lire contract
Ta Kuan	AGS-1601	5942	Taiwan Navy	October 1993	17 December 1994	26 September 1995		about 100 Billion Lire contract
Italian ship Elettra (A 5340)	A 5340	6080	Italian Navy	March 2000	24 July 2002	2 April 2003	Anima i silenzi aerei	About 139 Billion Lire contract
