= Algerian amphibious transport dock Kalaat Béni Abbès =

Active warship of the Algerian National Navy

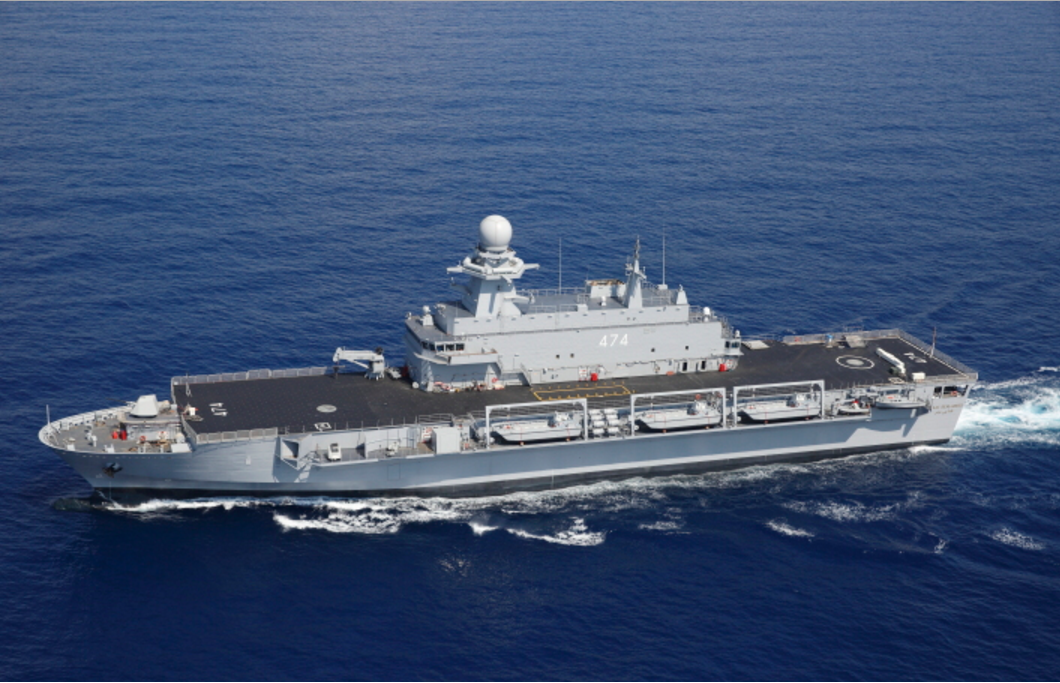
- Kalaat Béni Abbès underway

History

Algeria
- Name: Kalaat Béni Abbès
- Namesake: Kalâa Ait Abbas
- Ordered: August 2011
- Builder: Fincantieri
- Launched: 8 January 2014
- Commissioned: 4 September 2014
- Identification: MMSI number: 605126919; Callsign: 7TLK
- Status: Active

General characteristics
- Type: Amphibious transport dock
- Displacement: 8,800 t (8,700 long tons)
- Length: - 142.9 m (469 ft) LOA; - 127.6 m (419 ft) LPP
- Beam: 21.5 m (71 ft)
- Draught: 5.3 m (17 ft)
- Propulsion: 2 × diesel engines Wärtsilä 12V32 12,000 kW (16,000 hp)
- Speed: 20 knots (37 km/h; 23 mph)
- Range: 7,000 nautical miles (13,000 km; 8,100 mi) at 15 knots (28 km/h; 17 mph)
- Complement: 152 petty officers, quartermasters and sailors; 438+12 marines
- Sensors & processing systems: 1 × Leonardo-Finmeccanica MFRA 3D AESA radar; - 2 × navigation radar; - 1 × helo deck radar
- Armament: 1 OTO Melara 76 mm/62 SR Super Rapido; 2 × OTO Melara Oerlikon KBA 25 mm/80; 8-cell SYLVER A50 VLS for 8 Aster 15&30 missiles (1x8 more A50 VLS FFBNW)
- Aircraft carried: 3 AW101 transport helicopters or 5 Super Lynx helicopters type
- Aviation facilities: Hangar for recovery of Super Lynx helicopters type

Kalaat Beni Abbes (L-474) (Arabic: (474) قلعة بني عباس) is an amphibious transport dock of the Algerian National Navy. The ship built by the Italian firm Fincantieri as an enlarged and improved version of the San Giorgio class. The ship measures 143 metres (469 ft) long and 21.5 metres (71 ft) wide.

The ship has a continuous flight deck with two deck-landing spots for helicopters at the bow and stern.

Ordered in 2011, the ship was commissioned by the Algerian National Navy on 4 September 2014. The first official docking - and commissioning ceremony - was on 28 March 2015 in the presence of the Chief of Staff of the ANP and the High Command of the Algerian National Navy.

== Capabilities ==
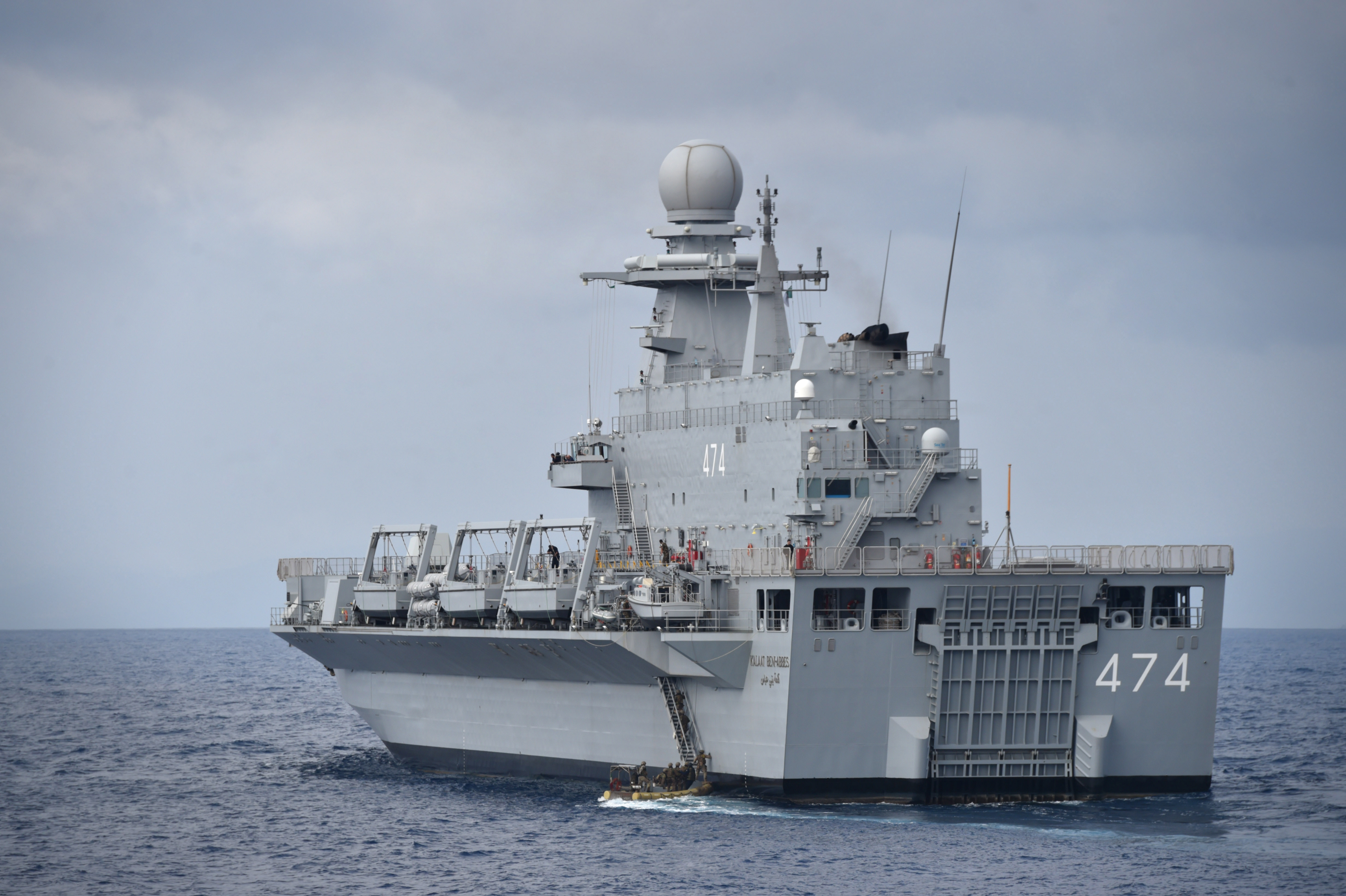
Stern view of the ship, 2016

The ship has an opening dock to the rear which allows it to launch up to three landing craft. The port side of the ship has davits which are able to launch three landing craft, and two fast boats for commandos. The ship also houses a garage for 15 heavy tanks and housing for 440 soldiers plus 150 crew. The ship also carries a 60-bed hospital and operating theaters.

The ship is continuously assisted by three craft also built by Fincantieri, named Chaland, which can each carry a heavy tank or a maximum of 140 personnel.

== Weapon systems ==
The ship is fitted with an EMPAR radar for detecting long-range threats, and 16 Aster 15 missiles in two vertical A-50 launchers, as well as a 76 mm turret and two Oerlikon KBA 25x137 mm cannons that can be used for defence against aircraft or surface targets. The vessel also has a complete electronic warfare suite provided by Thales and Elettronica, linked to two SCLAR-H Oto-Melara decoy launchers.
