= San Giorgio-class amphibious transport dock =

Italian Navy ship class

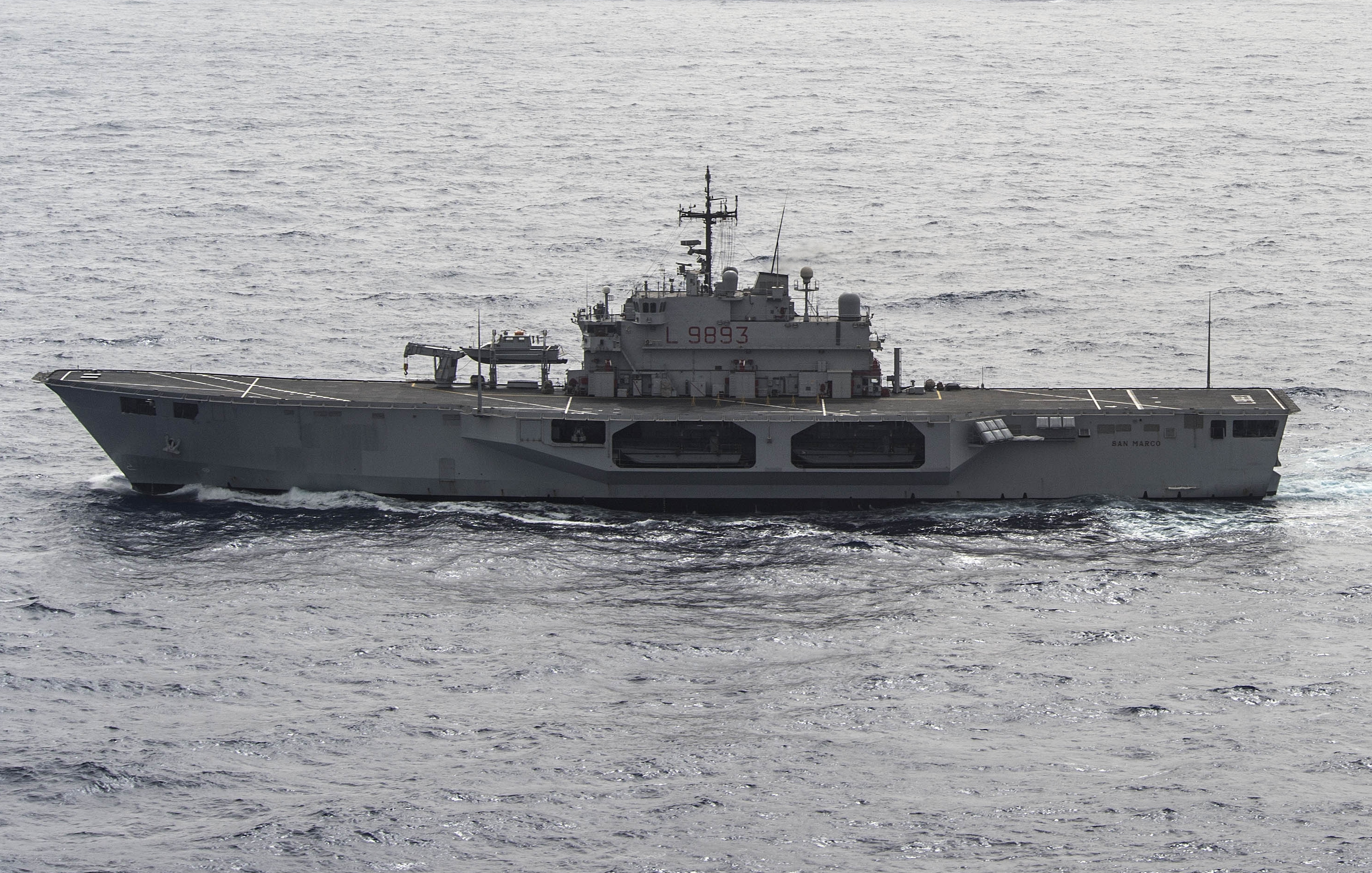
- San Marco underway in the Mediterranean Sea on 16 June 2016

Class overview
- Name: San Giorgio
- Builders: Fincantieri, Riva Trigoso Shipyard, Riva Trigoso (La Spezia)
- Operators: Italian Navy; Algerian National Navy; Qatari Emiri Navy
- Preceded by: Grado; Caorle
- Succeeded by: LxD-project
- Cost: $291 million
- In commission: 1988–present
- Building: 1
- Completed: 4
- Active: 4

General characteristics
- Type: Amphibious transport dock
- Displacement: - 7,960 t (7,830 long tons) full load; - 8,000 t (7,900 long tons) for San Giusto (full load)
- Length: 133 m (436 ft)
- Beam: 20.5 m (67 ft)
- Draught: 5.3 m (17 ft)
- Propulsion: - 2 × diesel engines Grandi Motori Trieste GMT A 420.12, 6,264 kW (8,400 hp) each; - 4 × diesel engine generators Grandi Motori Trieste GMT B230.6, 770 kW (1,030 hp) each
- Speed: 21 knots (39 km/h; 24 mph)
- Range: 7,500 nautical miles (13,900 km; 8,600 mi) at 16 knots (30 km/h; 18 mph)
- Boats & landing craft carried: - 3 × LCM62-class LCM; - 3 × MTP96-class LCVP; - 1 × patrol craft
- Capacity: 350 troops with 30 medium tanks or 36 tracked armoured vehicles
- Complement: 17 officers, 163 ratings
- Sensors & processing systems: - SMA MM/SPQ 702 search radar; - GEM Elettronica navigation radar: MM/SPN-748 then MM/SPN-753(V)9 and now dual band radar (X/Ka) MM/SPN-760(V)1; - Selex ES RTN-10X fire control radar
- Electronic warfare & decoys: Elettronica SpA INS-3 ECM/ESM suite
- Armament: - 1 × Otobreda 76 mm gun (removed from San Giorgio and San Marco to increase flight deck space); - 2 × OTO Melara - Oerlikon KBA 25/80 mm guns
- Aircraft carried: 3 × AW-101, 5 × Agusta Bell AB-212 helicopters or 18 SH90A
- Aviation facilities: Flight deck
- Notes: - San Giusto has a full load displacement 300t greater than the other ships in the class; - Italian ships in class include: San Giorgio (L9892); San Marco (L9893); San Giusto (L9894); - Algerian ship in class include only Kalaat Béni Abbès, armed with Aster 15 missiles; - one similar ship, Al Fulk, on order for the Qatari navy.

The San Giorgio class are amphibious transport docks (LPD) built by Fincantieri for the Qatari, Algerian, and Italian navies. These ships can carry a battalion of troops, and up to 36 armoured vehicles. The stern floodable dock can accommodate three landing craft. The ships are based at the Brindisi naval base on the Adriatic coast.

San Giorgio and San Marco have been modified with longer full-length flight decks with four landing spots. San Giusto, the third vessel, has not been modified since construction, however, it featured an improved design, and is normally employed as a training ship.

== Ships ==
Name	Pennant number	Hull number	Laid down	Launched	Commissioned	Motto	Status
Italian Navy San Giorgio class
San Giorgio	L9892	929	27 May 1985	21 February 1987	13 February 1988	Arremba San Zorzo	In service
San Marco	L9893	5825	26 March 1985	10 October 1987	14 May 1988	Ti con nu, nu con ti	In service
San Giusto	L9894	5932	19 August 1991	2 December 1993	14 April 1994	Coragio no manca co' semo nel giusto	In service
Algerian National Navy an improved San Giorgio class/BDSL
Kalaat Béni Abbès	L474	6235	11 January 2012	14 January 2014	4 September 2014		In service
Qatari Emiri Navy an improved San Giorgio class/BDSL
Al Fulk	L141	6295	5 June 2021	24 January 2023	29 November 2024	n/a	In service

== Replacement class ==
The two oldest vessels of this class are scheduled for replacement. The Italian Navy has received the go-ahead to procure two 16,500-ton amphibious assault ships. According to the Italian MoD's Multi-Year Defence Planning Document (Documento Programmatico Pluriennale della Difesa, DPP) for the 2023–2025 timeframe, these ships are to be able to accommodate two LC-23 heavy landing craft for battle tanks or other vehicles and flight deck with multiple helicopter spots alongside extensive hangar and personnel accommodation facilities. A contract is possible in 2024 and delivery is anticipated in the 2028–2030 period.

== Improved San Giorgio or Landing and Logistic Support Ship ==
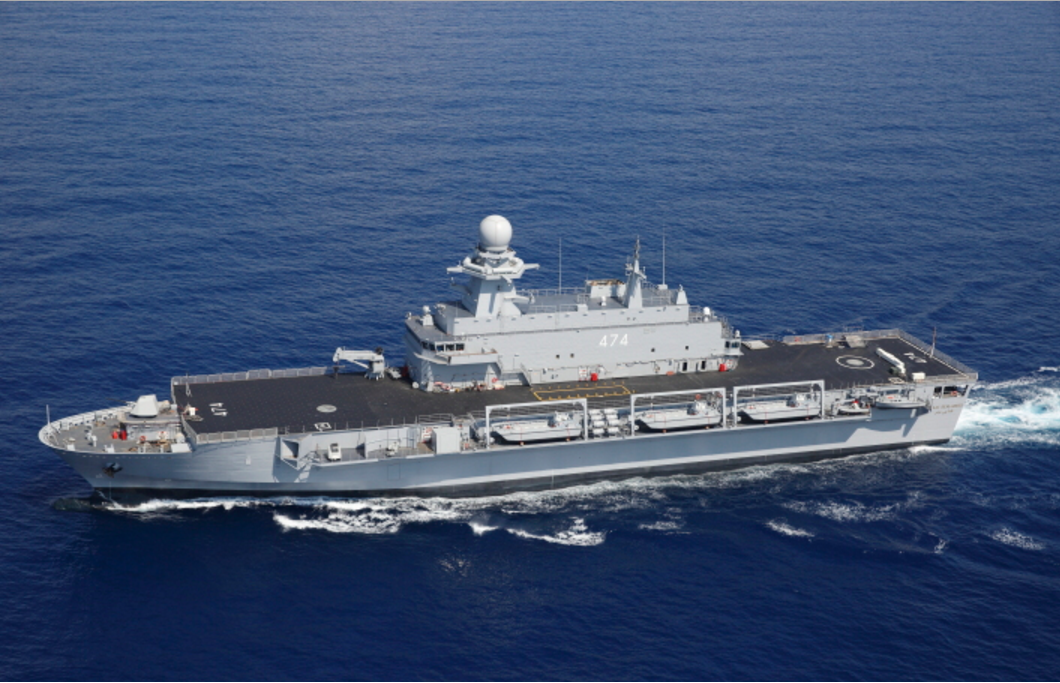
Kalaat Béni Abbès, of the Improved San Giorgio class

In July 2011 the Algerian Navy placed an order with Fincantieri for an improved version of the San Giorgio class amphibious transport ships classified as Bâtiment de Débarquement et de Soutien Logistique (BDSL). On 8 January 2014 the BDSL was launched on a barge at the Fincantieri shipyard in Sestri Levante.

Kalaat Béni Abbès is fitted with Aster 15 behind the island superstructure, with one OTO Melara 76 mm Super Rapid at the bow and with two 25 mm remote weapon stations.

The BDSL can accommodate three landing craft mechanized, three small landing craft vehicle personnel, one large landing craft personnel and two semi-rigid boats. The hangar can accommodate up to 15 armoured vehicles.

The crew will consist of 150 sailors while the ship may accommodate a landing force of 440 soldiers.

== See also ==
- Galicia-class landing platform dock
