= Structure of the Italian Navy =

The following is the structure of the Italian Navy as of June 2020. It is considered a multiregional and a blue-water navy.

== Chief of the Navy General Staff ==
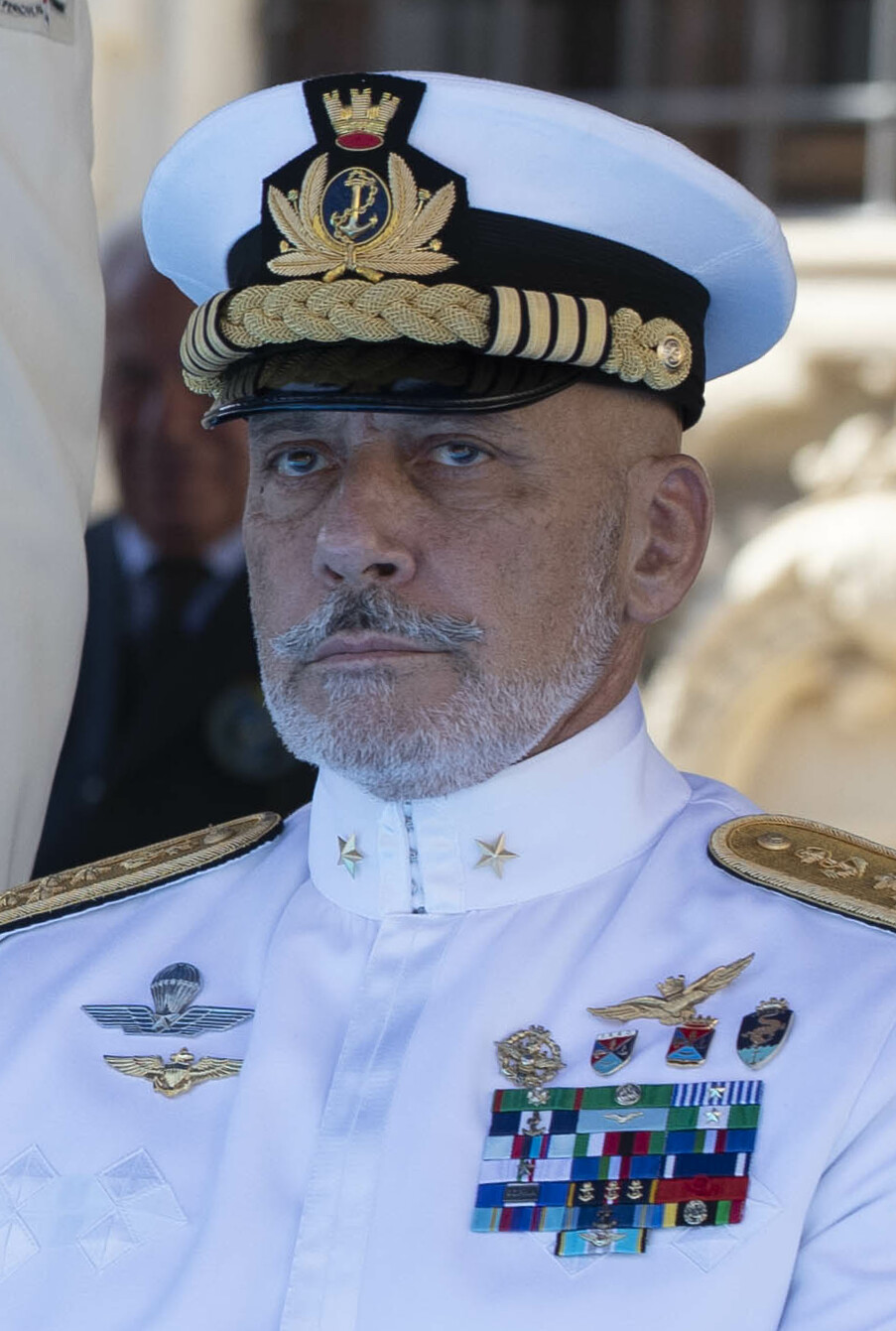
Former Chief of the Navy General Staff Admiral Giuseppe Cavo Dragone

The Chief of the Navy General Staff heads the Navy General Staff in Rome, manages the bureaucratic aspects of the navy, and supervises four major commands.

- Chief of the Navy General Staff (Capo di stato maggiore della Marina)
  - Corps of the Port Captaincies (Corpo delle Capitanerie di Porto), Coast Guard - in peacetime assigned to the Ministry of Infrastructure and Transport
  - Navy Military Personnel Employment Directorate (Direzione per l'Impiego del Personale Militare della Marina - MARIPERS)
  - Administrative Responsibility Centre Main Office (Ufficio Generale del Centro di Responsabilità Amministrativa - MARIUGCRA)
  - Navy Health Inspectorate (Ispettorato di Sanità della Marina Militare - MARISPESAN)
    - Forensic Medicine Military Department Bari (Dipartimento Militare di Medicina Legale Bari Palese - DMML Bari Palese)
    - Forensic Medicine Military Department La Spezia (Dipartimento Militare di Medicina Legale La Spezia - DMML La Spezia)
  - Navy Officer Clubs Agency (Ente Circoli della Marina Militare - MARICIRCOLI)
    - Officers, and petty officers clubs in Ancona, Augusta, Brindisi, Cagliari, La Maddalena, La Spezia, Livorno, Messina, Naples, Rome, Taranto, and Venice, and holiday clubs in Chianciano Terme, Levico Terme, Cortina d'Ampezzo, and on Monte Terminillo
  - Navy Carabinieri Command (Comando Carabinieri per la Marina)
  - Navy Officers Promotion Commissions Office (Ufficio Commissioni di Avanzamento per gli Ufficiali della Marina Militare - MARICAU)
  - Navy NCOs, Sergeants, Volunteers in Permanent Service Promotion Commission Offices (Uffici Generale Commissioni Avanzamento Marescialli, Sergenti e Volontari in S.P. della Marina Militare - MARICAM - MARICAS - MARICAV)
  - Navy Engineer Corps Chief Office (Ufficio Capo di Corpo del Genio della Marina)
    - Naval Engineer Specialty (Specialità Genio Navale)
    - Naval Weapons Specialty (Specialità Armi Navali)
    - Infrastructure Specialty (Specialità Infrastrutture)
  - Maritime Military Medical Corps Chief Office (Ufficio Capo di Corpo Sanitario Militare Marittimo)
  - Maritime Military Commissariat Corps Chief Office (Ufficio Capo di Corpo di Commissariato Militare Marittimo)
  - Port Captaincies Corps Chief Office (Ufficio Capo di Corpo delle Capitanerie di Porto)
  - Andrea Doria Institut (Istituto Andrea Doria - MARIDORIA), the navy's orphanage

=== Navy General Staff ===
The functions of the Navy General Staff are divided in two sections: one under direct control of the Chief of the Navy General Staff, and one under control of the Deputy Chief of the Navy General Staff. The Chief of the Navy General Staff's section is further divided into offices and commands that are part of the Navy General Staff and offices and commands that report to the Chief of the Navy General Staff, but are outside the actual Navy General Staff.

- Chief of the Navy General Staff (Capo di stato maggiore della Marina)
  - Navy General Staff (Stato Maggiore della Marina - MARISTAT)
    - Adjutant of the Chief of the Navy General Staff (Assistente del Capo di Stato Maggiore della Marina)
    - Special Secretariat of the Chief of the Navy General Staff (Segreteria Particolare Capo di Stato Maggiore della Marina)
    - Main Financial Planning Office (Ufficio Pianificazione Generale Finanziaria - UGPF)
    - Legal Affairs Main Office (Ufficio Generale Affari Legale - UGAL)
    - Special Forces and Underwater Units Office (Ufficio Forze Speciali e Reparti Subacquei - UFS)
    - Public Information and Communication Office (Ufficio Pubblica Informazione e Comunicazione - UPICOM)
    - Accident Prevention and Vigilance, and Environmental Protection Main Coordination Office (Ufficio Generale di Coordinamento per la Prevenzione, la Vigilanza Antinfortunistica e la Tutela dell'Ambiente - UGECOPREVA)
    - Central Security Department of the Navy (Organo Centrale di Sicurezza della Marina Militare - MARINA OCS)

=== Deputy Chief of the Navy General Staff ===
The Deputy Chief of the Navy General Staff manages the bureaucratic aspects of the Navy.

- Deputy Chief of the Navy General Staff (Sottocapo di Stato Maggiore della Marina)
  - Adjutant of the Deputy Chief of the Navy General Staff (Assistante del Sottocapo di Stato Maggiore della Marina)
  - Special Secretariat of the Deputy Chief of the Navy General Staff (Segreteria Particolare Sottocapo di Stato Maggiore della Marina)
  - Main Secretariat of the Navy General Staff (Segreteria Generale di Stato Maggiore Marine della Marina)
  - 1st Department Personnel (1° Reparto Personale)
  - 3rd Department Maritime Planning and Policy (3° Reparto Pianificazione e Politica Marittima)
  - 4th Department Infrastructure and Logistics (4° Reparto Infrastrutture e Logistica)
  - 5th Department Submarines (5° Reparto Sommergibili)
  - 6th Department Aircraft (6° Reparto Aeromobili)
  - 7th Department Ships (7° Reparto Navi)
  - 8th Department Amphibious Forces (8° Reparto Anfibio)
  - C4 and Security Department (Reparto C4 e Sicurezza)
  - General Affairs Office (Ufficio Affari Generale - UAG)
  - Space and Technological Innovation Office (Ufficio Spazio e Innovazione Tecnologica)
  - Headquarters Command Office (Ufficio Comando alla Sede)
  - History Office (Ufficio Storico)
    - Naval History Museum (Museo Storico Navale), in Venice
    - Naval Technical Museum (Museo Tecnico Navale), in La Spezia
  - Prevention and Protection Service (Servizio di Prevenzione e Protezione)
  - Spiritual Adjutant (Assistante Spirituale)

== Fleet Command ==
The Fleet Command is responsible for all operational units of the Italian Navy, with the exception of the Special Forces. Based in the Santa Rosa military district of Rome the command is headed by the Commander in Chief Naval Fleet (Comando in Capo della Squadra Navale or CINCNAV) with the rank of Vice admiral, who reports directly to the Chief of the Navy.

- Naval Headquarters Santa Rosa (Quartier Generale Marina Santa Rosa - QUARTGENMARINA Santa Rosa), at the Santa Rosa military district
  - Virtual Regional Maritime Traffic Centre (V‐RMTC)
  - Maritime Surveillance Operations Centre (Centrale Operativa di Sorveglianza Marittima - COSM)
  - Aero-naval Operations Centre (Centrale Operativa Aero‐navale - COAN)
- Anti-submarine Analysis and Evaluation Section (Sezione Valutazione e Analisi Anti Sommergibile - SVAAS), at Naval Air Station Sigonella

=== 1st Naval Division ===
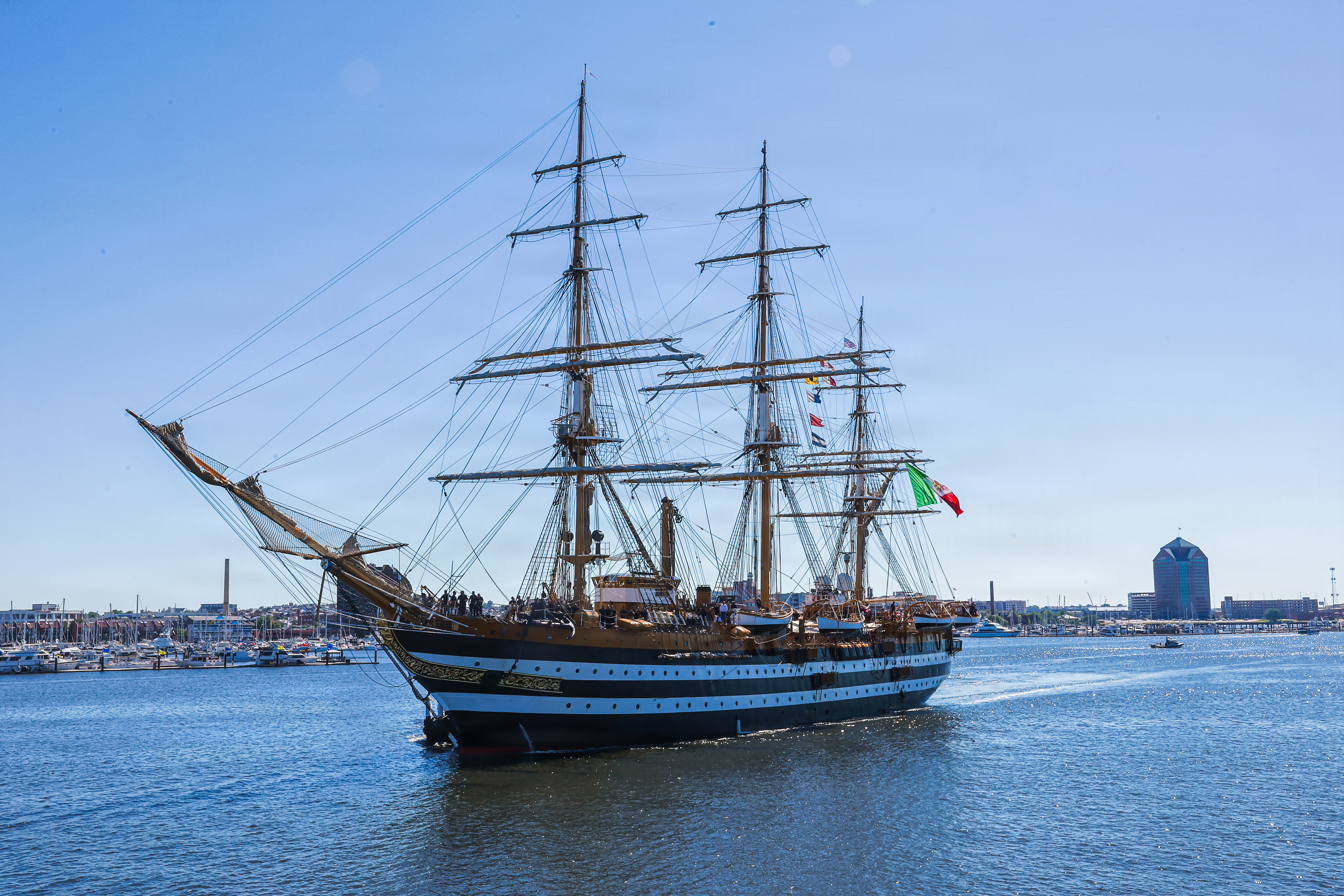
Sail training ship "Amerigo Vespucci" arriving in Baltimore

Frigate Carlo Margottini on patrol

The 1st Naval Division (1ª Divisione Navale - COMDINAV UNO) is based in La Spezia and headed by a Counter Admiral.

- 1st Naval Division (1ª Divisione Navale), in La Spezia
  - Horizon-class air-defence destroyer: "Caio Duilio"
  - Bergamini-class frigates: "Antonio Marceglia", "Carlo Margottini", "Emilio Bianchi", "Luigi Rizzo", "Spartaco Schergat", "Virginio Fasan"
  - Electronic surveillance ship: "Elettra"
  - Sail training ship "Amerigo Vespucci"
  - Sail training ship "Palinuro"
  - Sail training ship "Italia"
  - 1st Auxiliary Ships Group (Primo Gruppo Navi Ausiliarie - COMGRUPAUS UNO), in La Spezia
    - Gorgona-class coastal transport ships: "Gorgona", "Tremiti"
    - Ponza-class coastal transport ships: "Ponza", "Palmaria", "Tavolara"
    - Ciclope-class deep-sea tugboat: "Gigante"
  - Naval Station La Spezia (Stazione Navale La Spezia - MARISTANAV La Spezia), manages harbour operations
    - Porto-class coastal tugboats: "Porto Empedocle", "Porto Salvo", "Porto Torres"

=== 2nd Naval Division ===
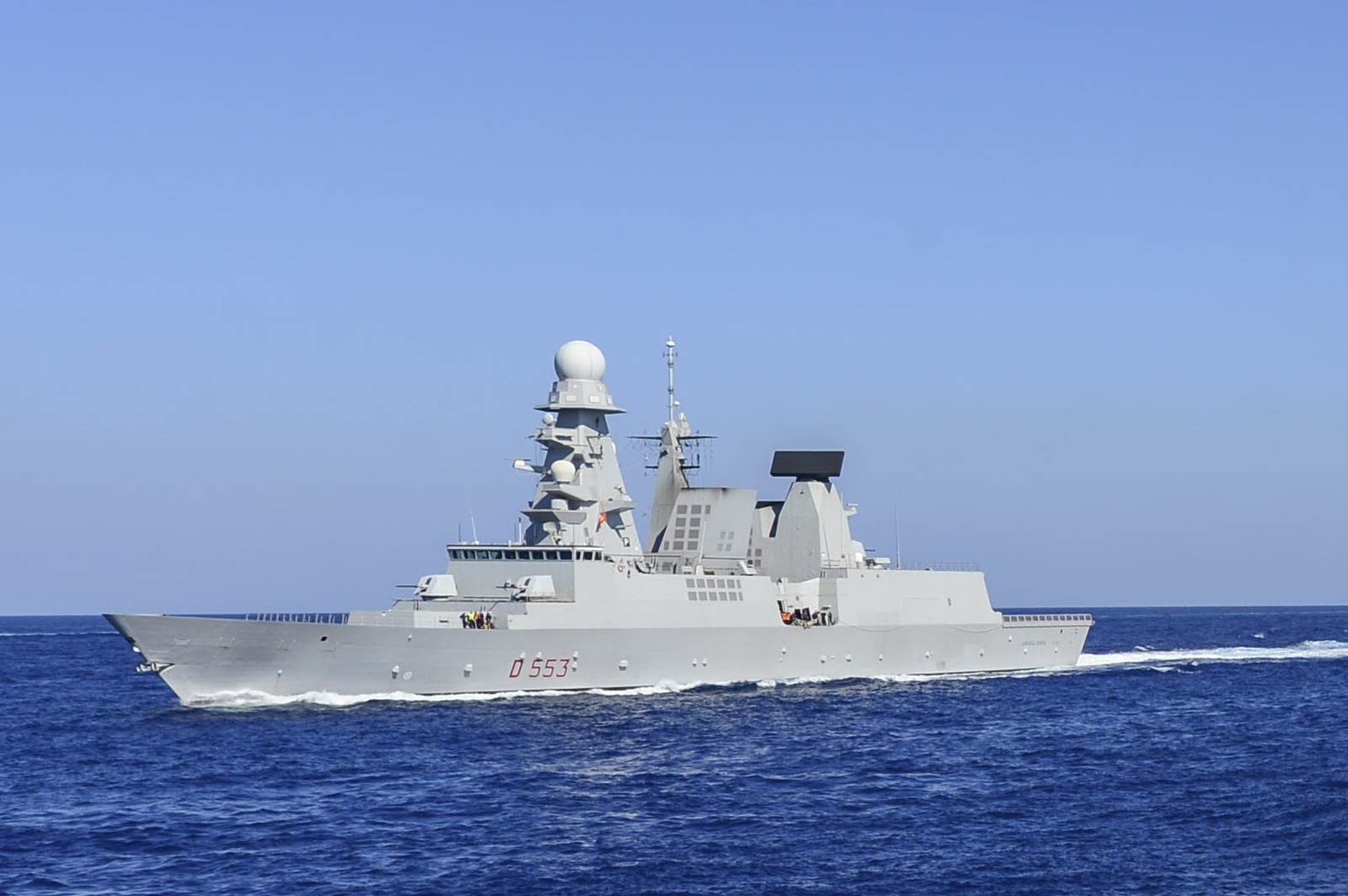
Destroyer "Andrea Doria" underway

The 2nd Naval Division (2ª Divisione Navale - COMDINAV DUE) is based in Taranto and headed by either a Divisional admiral (ammiraglio di divisione) or a 1 star admiral (contrammiraglio). The division includes the Italian navy's carrier strike group.

- 2nd Naval Division (2ª Divisione Navale), in Taranto
  - Aircraft carrier: "Cavour"
  - Horizon-class air-defence destroyer: "Andrea Doria"
  - Bergamini-class frigates: "Carlo Bergamini", "Federico Martinengo", "Carabiniere", "Alpino"
  - Thaon di Revel-class frigates: "Thaon di Revel", "Francesco Morosini", "Raimondo Montecuccoli", "Giovanni delle Bande Nere"
  - Vulcano-class logistic support ships: "Vulcano", "Atlante"
  - Etna-class replenishment oiler: "Etna"
  - 2nd Auxiliary Ships Group (Secondo Gruppo Navi Ausiliarie - COMGRUPAUS DUE)
    - Gorgona-class coastal transport ship: "Caprera", "Capri", "Pantelleria"
    - Ponza-class coastal transport ship: "Levanzo", "Procida"
    - Ciclope-class deep-sea tugboat: "Saturno"
  - Naval Station Taranto (Stazione Navale Taranto - MARISTANAV Taranto), manages harbour operations
    - Ferry-boat: "Cheradi"
    - Coastal tugboat: "Ercole"
    - Porto-class coastal tugboat: "Porto Pisano"
    - Ciclope-class deep-sea tugboats: "Saturno", "Tenace"

=== 3rd Naval Division ===
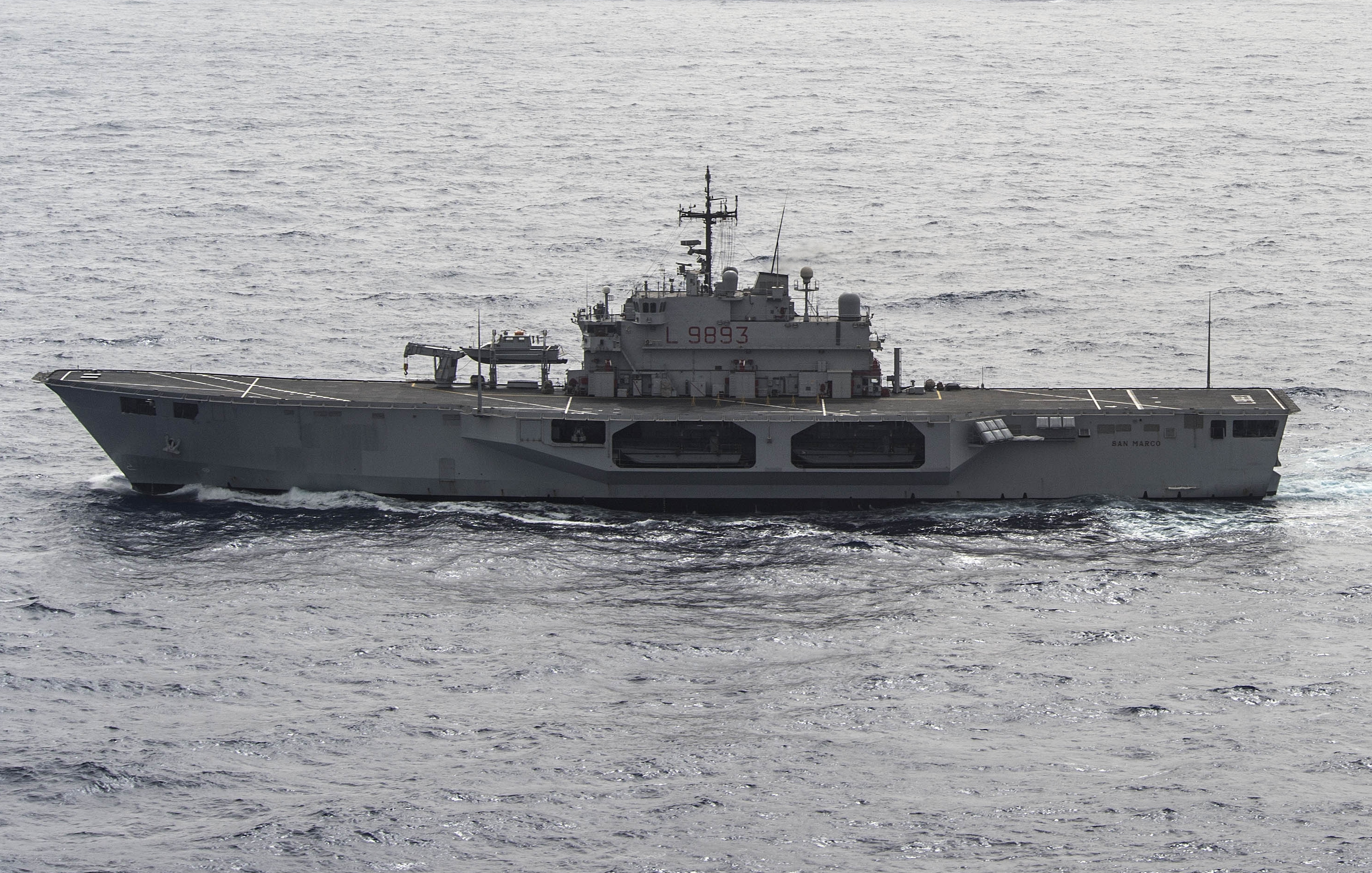
"San Marco" underway

The 3rd Naval Division (3ª Divisione Navale - COMDINAV TRE) is based in Brindisi and headed by a Counter Admiral. The division contains the amphibious units of the Italian Navy and together with the San Marco Marine Brigade and the Italian Army's Cavalry Brigade "Pozzuolo del Friuli" forms the Italian Armed Forces' National Sea Projection Capability (Forza di proiezione dal mare).

- 3rd Naval Division (3ª Divisione Navale), in Brindisi
  - Landing helicopter dock: "Trieste"
  - San Giorgio-class amphibious transport docks: "San Giorgio", "San Marco", "San Giusto"
  - Ciclope-class deep-sea tugboat: "Ciclope"
  - Coastal Patrol Ships Squadron (Comando Squadriglia Pattugliatori Costieri - COMSQUACOST)
    - Esploratore-class coastal patrol boats: "Esploratore", "Sentinella", "Vedetta", "Staffetta"
  - Naval Station Brindisi (Stazione Navale Brindisi - MARISTANAV Brindisi), manages harbour operations
    - Porto-class coastal tugboat: "Porto Corsini"
    - RP 118-class harbour tugboat: Rp 107, Rp 108, Rp 118

=== 4th Naval Division ===
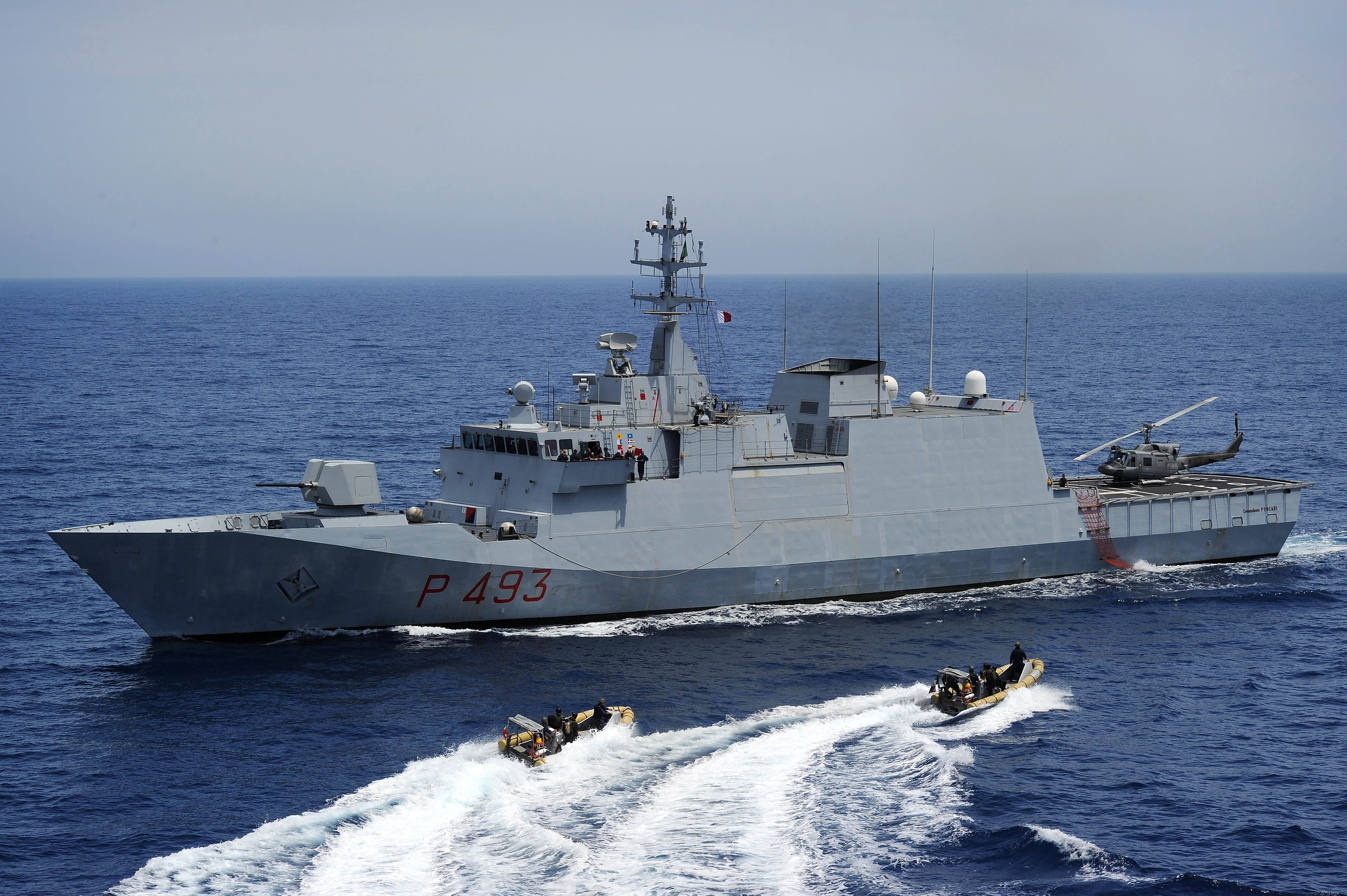
"Comandante Foscari" patrol vessel

The 4th Naval Division (4ª Divisione Navale - COMDINAV QUATTRO) is based in Augusta and Messina and headed by a Counter Admiral. From the 2014 to 2022 the unit was designated as Coastal Defense and Surveillance Patrol Forces Command (Comando Forze da Pattugliamento per la Sorveglianza e la Difesa Costiera). As part of the 2014 reform it transferred most of its coastal defense duties to the Italian Coast Guard and has focused since on offshore patrols.

- 4th Naval Division (4ª Divisione Navale), in Augusta
  - 1st Patrol Ships Squadron (Prima Squadriglia Pattugliatori - COMSQUAPAT UNO)
    - Cassiopea-class offshore patrol vessels: "Cassiopea", "Spica", "Vega" (being replaced by PPX class)
    - Sirio-class offshore patrol vessels: "Sirio", "Orione" (being replaced by PPX class)
  - 2nd Patrol Ships Squadron (Seconda Squadriglia Pattugliatori - COMSQUAPAT DUE)
    - Comandanti-class offshore patrol vessels: "Comandante Cigala Fulgosi", "Comandante Borsini", "Comandante Bettica", "Comandante Foscari"
  - 3rd Auxiliary Ships Group (Terzo Gruppo Navi Ausiliarie - COMGRUPAUS TRE), in Messina
    - Simeto-class water tankers: "Ticino", "Tirso"
    - Panarea-class coastal oil tankers: "Panarea", "Linosa", "Favignana", "Salina"
    - Gorgona-class coastal transport ship: "Lipari"
    - Ciclope-class deep-sea tugboats: "Polifemo", "Titano"
  - Naval Station Augusta (Stazione Navale Augusta - MARISTANAV Augusta), manages harbour operations
    - Porto-class coastal tugboat: "Porto Conte"

=== 5th Naval Division ===
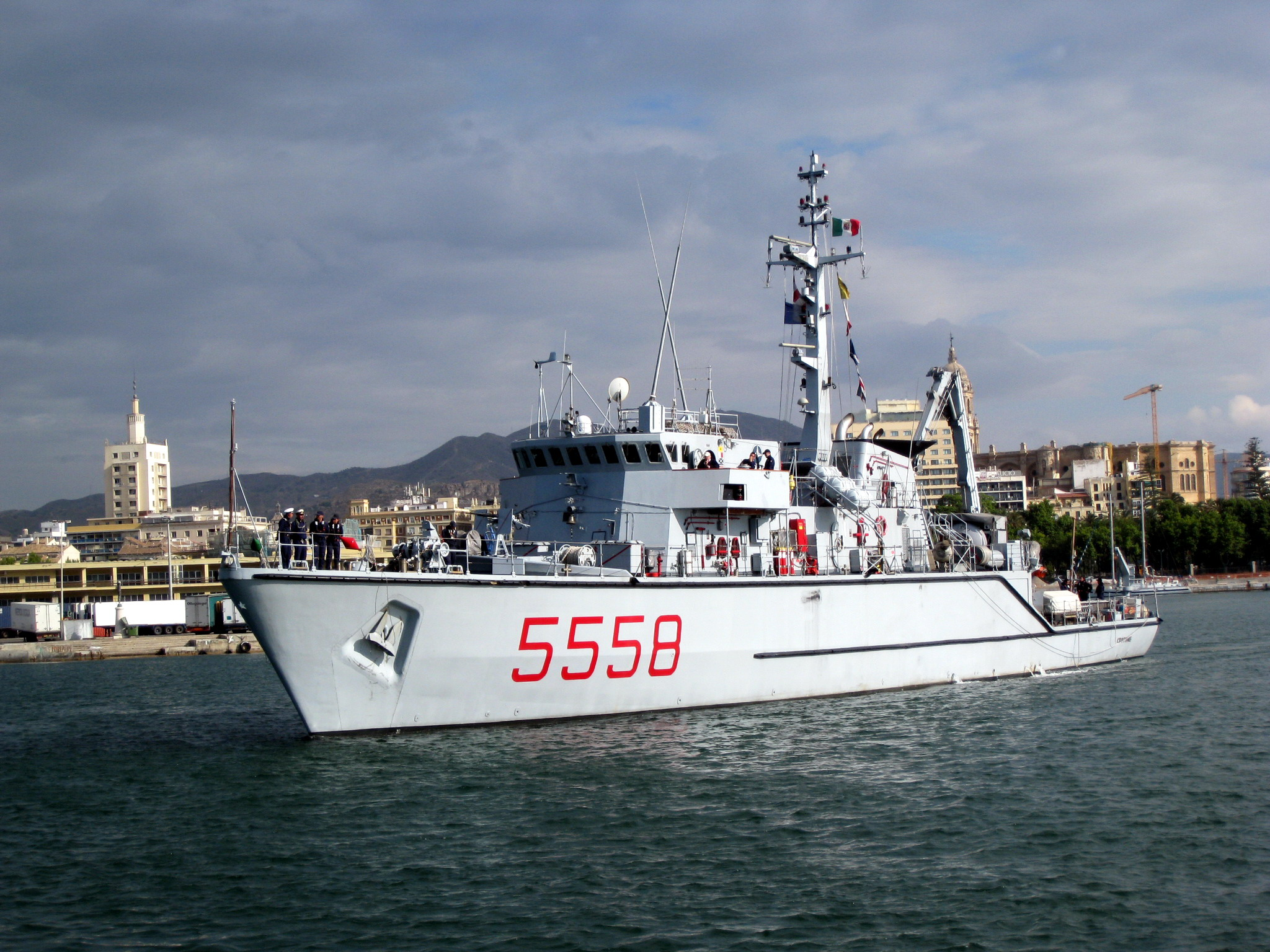
Minehunter "Crotone" in Málaga

The 5th Naval Division (5ª Divisione Navale - COMDINAV QUINTA) is based in La Spezia and headed by a Counter Admiral. From the 2014 to 2025 the unit was designated as Mine Countermeasures Forces Command (Comando delle Forze di Contromisure Mine - MARICODRAG). The division operates the Italian Navy's mine countermeasures forces.

- 5th Naval Division (5ª Divisione Navale), in La Spezia
  - 54th Coastal Minesweepers Squadron (54^ Squadriglia Dragamine Costieri - COMSQUADRAG CINQUE QUATTRO), in La Spezia
    - Gaeta-class minehunters: "Gaeta", "Termoli", "Alghero", "Numana", "Crotone", "Viareggio", "Chioggia", "Rimini" (class to be replaced by twelve New Generation Minehunters)
  - Hydrographic and Experiences Units Squadron (Squadriglia Unità Idrografiche ed Esperienze - COMSQUAIDRO), in La Spezia
    - Hydrographic survey vessel: "Ammiraglio Magnaghi" (will be replaced by the Major Hydro-oceanographic Ship)
    - Ninfe-class hydrographic research vessels: "Aretusa", "Galatea"
    - Nato Research vessels: "Leonardo", "Alliance"
    - Rossetti-class research vessels: "Raffaele Rossetti", "Vincenzo Martellotta"
  - Mine Warfare Training and Evaluation Centre (Centro Addestramento Guerra di Mine - MARICENDRAG), in La Spezia
  - Multi-Role Ocean Surveillance Ship "Tritone"

=== Submarines Command ===
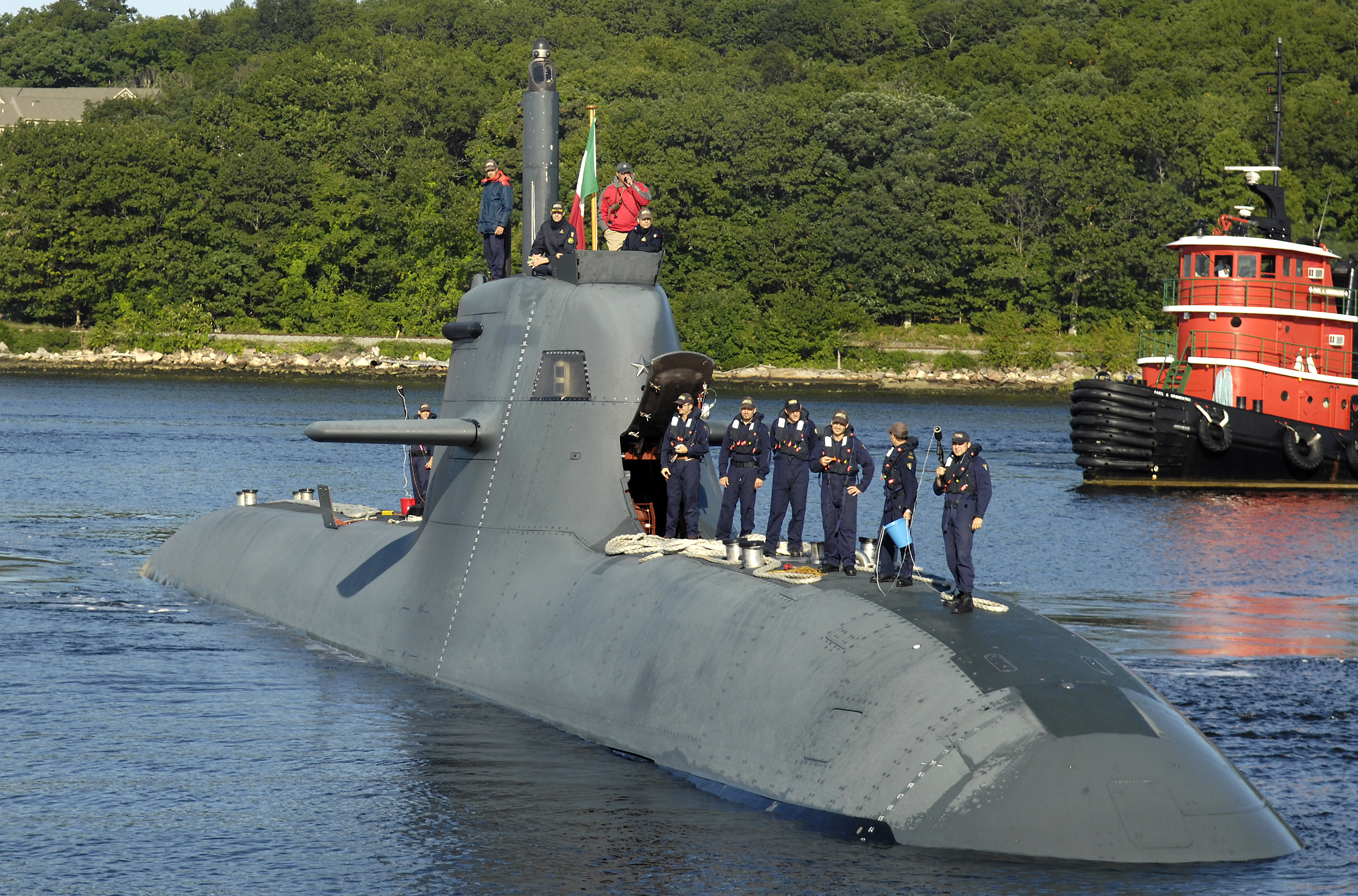
Submarine "Salvatore Todaro" in New London, Connecticut

The Submarines Command (Comando Sommergibili della Marina Militare - MARICOSOM) is based in Rome and headed by a Counter Admiral. The commanding officer of the Submarines Command also heads the Navy General Staff's 5th Department Submarines, and thus is responsible for all submarine assets of the navy, and their procurement, maintenance, development, training, and operational doctrine. Submarine operations are conducted by the Submarines Flotilla (Comando Flottiglia Sommergibili - COMFLOTSOM) in Taranto.

- Submarines Command (Comando Sommergibili della Marina Militare - MARICOSOM), in Rome
  - Submarines Flotilla (Comando Flottiglia Sommergibili - COMFLOTSOM), in Taranto
    - Sauro-class attack submarines: "Salvatore Pelosi", "Giuliano Prini", "Primo Longobardo", "Gianfranco Gazzana-Priaroggia" (to be replaced by four Type 212 NFS submarines)
    - Todaro-class attack submarines: "Salvatore Todaro", "Scirè", "Pietro Venuti", "Romeo Romei"
    - Submarines School, in Taranto
    - Submarines Technical and Logistics Service

=== Air Forces Command ===
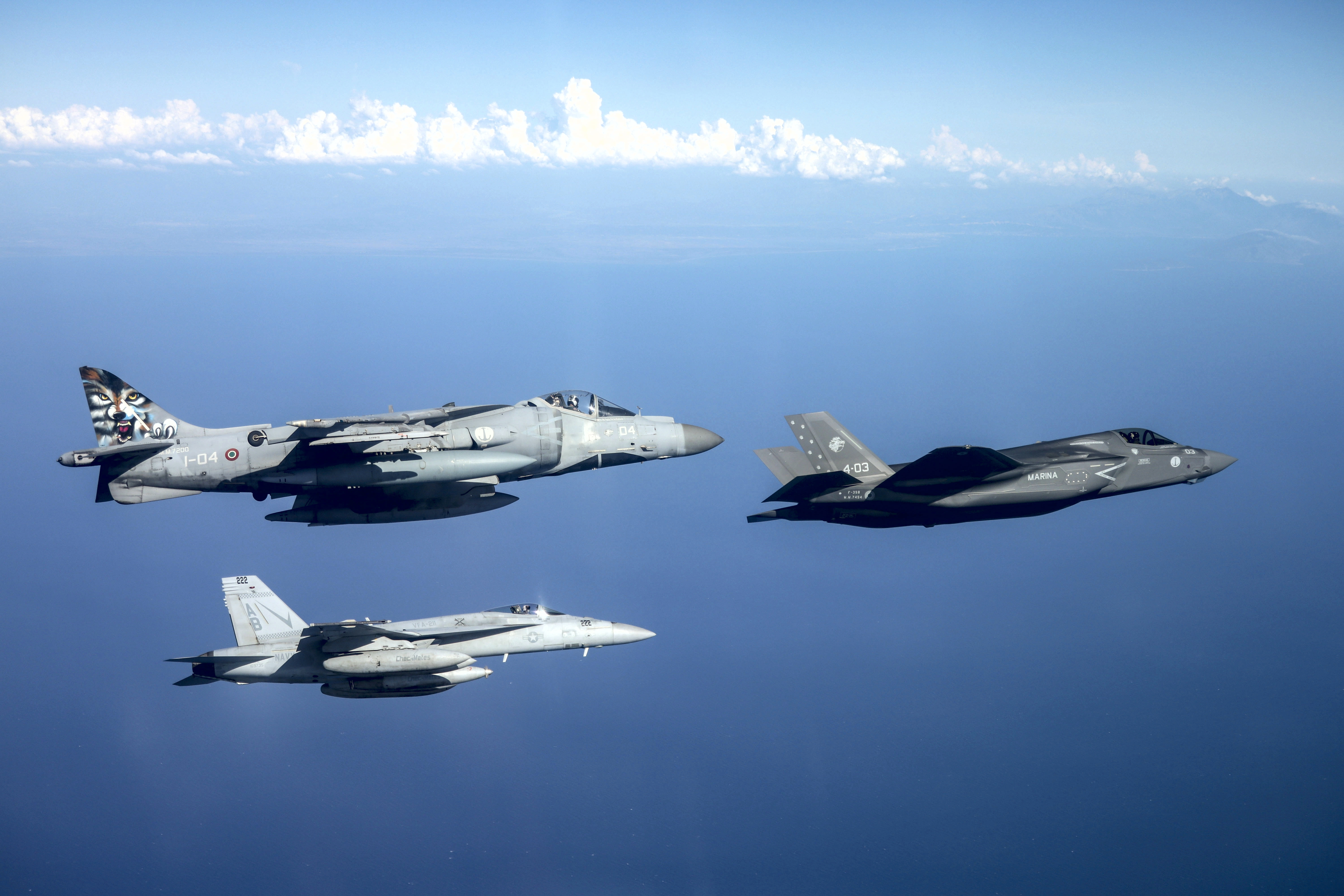
Italian Navy F-35B Lightning II (right) and AV-8B Harrier II (foreground) alongside an F-18E Super Hornet of the US Navy

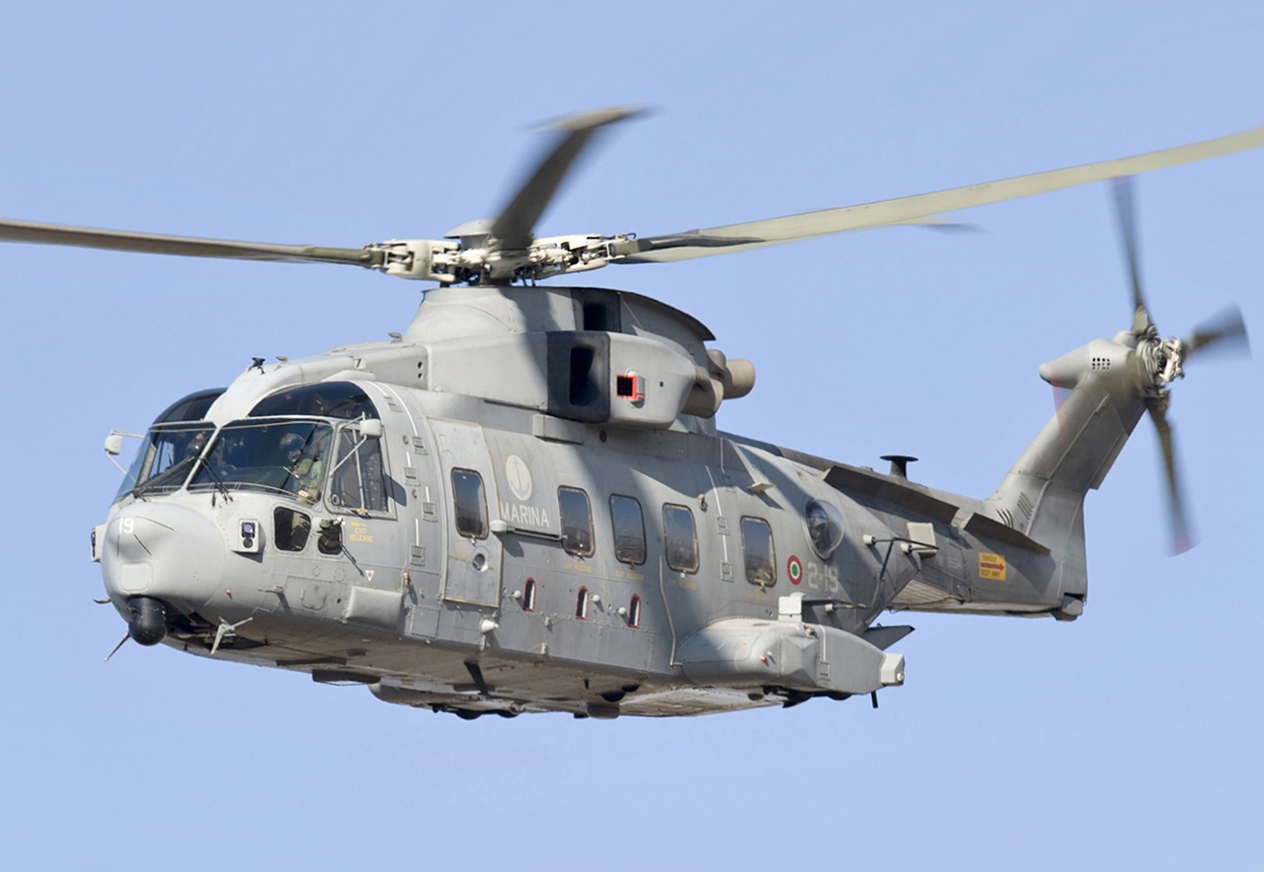
Italian Navy SH-101A ASuW/ASW helicopter

The Air Forces Command (Comando delle Forze Aeree - COMFORAER) is based in Rome and headed by a Counter Admiral. The command trains all the personnel destined to operate the aerial assets of the navy and maintains all of the navy's flying materiel. The commanding officer of the Air Forces Command also heads the Navy General Staff's 6th Department Aircraft, and thus is responsible for all air assets of the navy, and their procurement, maintenance, development, training, and operational doctrine.

- Air Forces Command (Comando delle Forze Aeree - COMFORAER), in Rome
  - P180 Aerial Section (Sezione Aerea P180 - SEZAER), at Pratica di Mare Air Base with 3x P.180 Maritime liaison planes
  - Naval Aircraft Station (Stazione Aeromobili della Marina Militare - MARISTAER), at Taranto-Grottaglie Airport
    - Carrier Aircraft Support Group (Gruppo Supporto Aerei Imbarcati - GRUPAER)
      - Operations Unit (Reparto Operazioni) with AV-8B+ Harrier II and F-35B Lightning II fighters
      - Operational Support Unit (Reparto Supporto Operativo)
      - Operational Informations Unit (Reparto Informazioni Operative)
    - 4th Helicopter Group (Quarto Gruppo Elicotteri - GRUPELICOT QUATTRO)
      - Operations Unit (Reparto Operazioni) with SH-90A ASuW/ASW helicopters and Camcopter S-100 unmanned aerial vehicles
      - Training Unit (Reparto Addestramento) with SH-90A ASuW/ASW helicopters
      - Operational Support Unit (Reparto Supporto Operativo)
      - Operational Informations Unit (Reparto Informazioni Operative)
  - Helicopter Station Luni (Stazione Elicotteri della Marina Militare - Luni - MARISTAELI Luni), at Sarzana-Luni Airport
    - Air-marittime Experimental Centre (Centro sperimentale aeromarittimo)
    - 1st Helicopter Group (Primo Gruppo Elicotteri - GRUPELICOT UNO)
      - Helicopter Assault Unit (Reparto Eliassalto) with MH-101A transport helicopters supporting COMSUBIN
      - ASuW/ASW/EW Unit (Reparto AWW/ASW/EW) with EH-101A HEW helicopters
      - Operational Support Unit (Reparto Supporto Operativo)
      - Operational Informations Unit (Reparto Informazioni Operative)
    - 5th Helicopter Group (Quinto Gruppo Elicotteri - GRUPELICOT CINQUE)
      - Helicopter Assault Unit (Reparto Eliassalto) with MH-90A tactical transport helicopters supporting COMSUBIN
      - ASuW/ASW Unit (Reparto AWW/ASW) with SH-90A ASuW/ASW helicopters
      - Operational Support Unit (Reparto Supporto Operativo)
      - Operational Informations Unit (Reparto Informazioni Operative)
  - Helicopter Station Catania (Stazione Elicotteri della Marina Militare - Catania - MARISTAELI Catania), at Catania–Fontanarossa Airport
    - 2nd Helicopter Group (Secondo Gruppo Elicotteri - GRUPELICOT DUE)
      - Operations Unit (Reparto Operazioni) with SH-90A ASuW/ASW helicopters
      - Operational Support Unit (Reparto Supporto Operativo)
      - Operational Informations Unit (Reparto Informazioni Operative)
    - 3rd Helicopter Group (Terzo Gruppo Elicotteri - GRUPELICOT TRE)
      - Operations Unit (Reparto Operazioni) with SH-101A ASuW/ASW helicopters
      - Training Unit (Reparto Addestramento) with SH-101A ASuW/ASW helicopters
      - Operational Support Unit (Reparto Supporto Operativo)
      - Operational Informations Unit (Reparto Informazioni Operative)

=== Amphibious Forces Command ===
The Amphibious Forces Command (Comando della Forza Anfibia - COMFORANF) is based in Rome and headed by Counter Admiral. The command is responsible for the Italian military's National Sea Projection Capability (Forza di proiezione dal mare) and the Marine Brigade "San Marco". The National Sea Projection Capability consists of the Marine Brigade "San Marco", the navy's 3rd Naval Division and the Italian Army's Cavalry Brigade "Pozzuolo del Friuli". The commanding officer of the Amphibious Forces Command also heads the Navy General Staff's 8th Department Amphibious Forces, and thus is responsible for all amphibious forces of the navy, and their procurement, maintenance, development, training, and operational doctrine.

==== Marine Brigade "San Marco" ====
- Marine Brigade "San Marco" (Brigata Marina "San Marco" - COMFORSBARC), in Brindisi
  - Brigade Headquarters (Quartier Generale della Brigata Marina San Marco - QUARTGEN Brigata Marina San Marco), in Brindisi
  - Training Battalion "Caorle" (Battaglione Scuole "Caorle"), in Brindisi
    - Formation Company
    - Advanced Training, Qualification and Specialization Company
    - Pedagne Team (manages the Pedagne Islands training area)
  - Landing Craft Group (Gruppo mezzi da sbarco della Marina Militare), in Brindisi - mans the landing craft of the amphibious ships and manages the ship-to-beach traffic
    - Propulsion and Vessels Section
    - Maritime Section
    - Beach Organization Section
    - Landing Craft Team, with 9× LCM62-class Landing Craft Mechanized and 4× LCM23-class Landing Craft Mechanized
    - Boat Team, with 20× MTP96-class Landing Craft Vehicle Personnel

===== 1st Regiment "San Marco" =====
The 1st Regiment "San Marco" is based in Brindisi and is the Italian Navy's amphibious force.

- 1st Regiment "San Marco" (1° Reggimento "San Marco"), in Brindisi
  - Command Unit (Reparto Comando)
    - Command Company, with an Air Support Element Team
    - Signals Company
    - Paratroopers Swimmers Company
      - 2x Reconnaissance platoons, 2x SALT platoons (Supporting Arms Liaison Team)
    - EOD/IEDD Engineer Platoon
    - FHT Platoon (Field HUMINT Team)
  - 1st Assault Battalion "Grado" (1° Battaglione Assalto "Grado")
    - 1st Assault Company "Bafile"
      - 3× Assault platoons, 1× support weapons platoon
    - 2nd Assault Company "Tobruk"
      - 3× Assault platoons, 1× support weapons platoon
    - Support Weapons Company
      - 1× Command support platoon, 1× AAV7-A1 platoon with amphibious assault vehicles (being replaced by Amphibious Combat Vehicles)
  - 2nd Assault Battalion "Venezia" (2° Battaglione Assalto "Venezia")
    - 3rd Assault Company "An Nassiriya"
      - 3× Assault platoons, 1× support weapons platoon
    - 4th Assault Company "Monfalcone"
      - 3× Assault platoons, 1× support weapons platoon
    - Support Weapons Company
      - 1× Command support platoon, 1× AAV7-A1 platoon with amphibious assault vehicles (being replaced by Amphibious Combat Vehicles)
  - 3rd Combat Logistic Support Battalion "Golametto" (3° Battaglione Supporto Logistico al Combattimento "Golametto")
    - Command Support Platoon
    - Logistic Company
    - Tactical Transport Company
    - Medical Company

===== 2nd Regiment "San Marco" =====
The 2nd Regiment "San Marco" is based in Brindisi. The regiment undertakes maritime interdiction operations and provides embarked naval protection teams for military and civilian ships.

- 2nd Regiment "San Marco" (2° Reggimento "San Marco"), in Brindisi
  - Mobility Team
  - 1st Naval Operations Battalion (1° Battaglione Operazioni Navali), in Brindisi
    - 2× Naval operations companies, each with 10× ship teams
  - 2nd Naval Operations Battalion (2° Battaglione Operazioni Navali), in Brindisi
    - Force Protection Company, with 10× teams
    - Port Protection Company, with 10× teams

===== 3rd Regiment "San Marco" =====
The 3rd Regiment "San Marco" based in Taranto is the Italian Navy's installation defense service (Servizio difesa installazioni - SDI), which guards and protects the bases of the navy.

- 3rd Regiment "San Marco" (3° Reggimento "San Marco"), in Taranto
  - K9 Unit, in Taranto
  - SDI Battalion North (Battaglione SDI Nord), in La Spezia
    - Command Support Team
    - Telecommunications Team
    - SDI Company Liguria, in La Spezia
      - 3× SDI platoons: in La Spezia (Military Harbour), Luni (Navy Helicopter Station), and Ancona (Ammunition Depot Poggio)
    - SDI Company Sardinia, in La Maddalena
      - 3× SDI platoons: at La Maddalena (Non-commissioned Officers School), Santo Stefano (Ammunition Depot), and Tavolara (NATO Very Low Frequency Station)
  - SDI Battalion Centre - Rome (Battaglione SDI Centro - Roma), in Rome
    - Command Support Team
    - Telecommunications Team
    - 1st Honor Guard Company, in Rome
    - SDI Company Rome, at the Navy General Staff
  - SDI Battalion South (Battaglione SDI Sud), in Taranto
    - Command Support Team
    - Telecommunications Team
    - SDI Company Taranto, in Taranto
      - 3× SDI platoons: in Taranto (Military Harbour), Grottaglie (Navy Helicopter Station), and Pozzuoli (Ammunition Depot Montagna Spaccata)
    - SDI Company Brindisi, in Brindisi
      - 3× SDI platoons: in Brindisi (Military Harbour), Mesagne (Ammunition Depot), and at the Marine Brigade "San Marco" headquarter
    - SDI Company Sicily, in Augusta
      - 4× SDI platoons: in Augusta (Military Harbour), Priolo Gargallo (Ammunition Depot Cava di Sorciaro), Catania (Navy Helicopter Station), and the NATO Pier in Augusta
    - National Emergencies Company (Strade Sicure Operation), in Taranto

===== 4th Regiment "Carlotto" =====
The 4th Regiment "Carlotto" was formed in 2026 and is based in Brindisi. The regiment provides logistic and medical support to the Marine Brigade "San Marco".

- 4th Regiment "Carlotto" (4° Reggimento "Carlotto"), in Brindisi
  - Transport Battalion "Cortellazzo" (Battaglione Trasporti Cortellazzo)
  - Technical Maintenance Support Battalion (Battaglione Supporto Tecnico Manutentivo), in Mesagne
  - Medical Unit (Reparto Sanitario)
  - Support Unit (Reparto Sostegno)
  - Infrastructure Technical Service (Servizio Tecnico Infrastrutture)
  - Massafra Training and Instruction Component (Componente Formativa Addestrativa Massafra), in Massafra

=== C4 and Security Command ===
The C4 and Security Command (Comando C4 e Sicurezza della Marina Militare - COMC4S MM) is headed by a Counter Admiral and operates the navy signal, communications and radar network.

- C4 and Security Command (Comando C4 e Sicurezza della Marina Militare - COMC4S MM), in Rome
  - Navy Programming Centre (Centro di Programmazione della Marina Militare - MARICENPROG), in Taranto
  - Navy Cryptographic Centre (Centro Crittografico della Marina Militare - MARICRYPTO), in Rome
  - Telecommunications and IT Centre Rome (Centro di Telecomunicazioni ed Informatica Roma - MARITELE Roma), in Rome
    - Peripheral Telecommunications and IT Centre Ancona (Centro Periferico Telecomunicazioni ed Informatica Ancona - MARITELE Ancona), in Ancona
      - Signal stations in Vieste and Vasto
    - Peripheral Telecommunications and IT Centre Augusta (Centro Periferico Telecomunicazioni ed Informatica Augusta - MARITELE Augusta), in Augusta
      - Radar stations at Capo Spartivento, Portopalo, Capo Ponente (Lampedusa), and Punta Sottile (Favignana)
      - Signal stations in Santa Panagia, Pantelleria and Palombara
    - Peripheral Telecommunications and IT Centre La Spezia (Centro Periferico Telecomunicazioni ed Informatica La Spezia - MARITELE La Spezia), in La Spezia
      - Radar station at Capo Carbonara
      - Signal stations at the forts of Castellana and Rocchetta
    - Peripheral Telecommunications and IT Centre Taranto (Centro Periferico Telecomunicazioni ed Informatica Taranto - MARITELE Taranto), in Taranto
      - Radar stations at Capo Santa Maria di Leuca, Sant'Andrea di Missipezza, and Capo Rizzuto
    - Secondary Telecommunications and IT Centre Brindisi (Centro Secondario Telecomunicazioni ed Informatica Brindisi - MARITELE Brindisi), in Brindisi
    - Secondary Telecommunications and IT Centre Cagliari (Centro Secondario Telecomunicazioni ed Informatica Cagliari - MARITELE Cagliari), in Cagliari
    - Secondary Telecommunications and IT Centre Naples (Centro Secondario Telecomunicazioni ed Informatica Napoli - MARITELE Napoli), in Naples
    - NATO Very Low Frequency Station, on Tavolara island

=== Air Naval Training Centre ===
The Air Naval Training Centre (Centro Addestramento Aeronavale della Marina Militare - MARICENTADD) is headed by a Counter Admiral and based in Taranto. It trains the navy's crews for service with the operational units.

- Air Naval Training Centre (Centro di Addestramento Aeronavale - MARICENTADD), in Taranto
  - Operations Unit (Reparto Operazioni)
  - Aircraft Training Unit (Reparto Addestramento Aeromobili)
  - Tactical Training Unit (Reparto Addestramento Tattico)
  - Weapon Systems Training Unit (Reparto Addestramento Sistemi di Piattaforma)
  - Operations and Weapons Technical Unit (Reparto Tecnico Armi e Operazioni)
  - Administrative Logistics Unit (Reparto Logistico Amministrativo)
  - Defense and General Support Unit (Reparto Supporto Generale e Difesa)

=== 10th Coastal Naval Group ===
The 10th Naval Coastal Group (Comando Decimo Gruppo Navale Costiero - COMGRUPNAVCOST DIECI) is the naval component of the United Nations' mission: Multinational Force and Observers, which guards the Egypt-Israeli border in the Sinai peninsula. The 10th Coastal Naval Group is based in Sharm El Sheikh in Egypt and patrols the Straits of Tiran and Gulf of Aqaba. The 3rd Naval Division's Esploratore-class coastal patrol boats rotate to the region for the mission.

- 10th Coastal Naval Group (Comando Decimo Gruppo Navale Costiero - COMGRUPNAVCOST DIECI), in Sharm El Sheikh (Egypt)

== Raiders and Divers Grouping "Teseo Tesei" ==
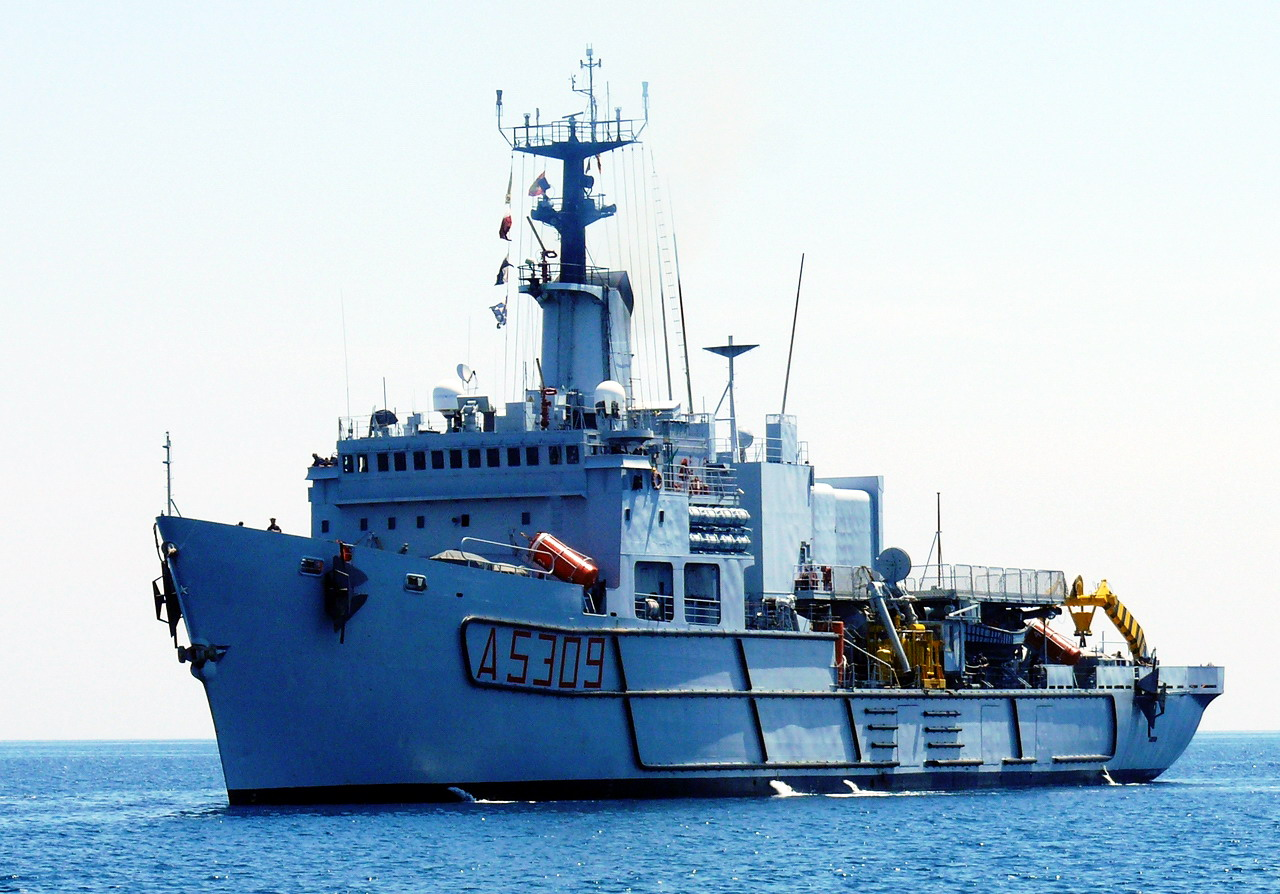
Submarine rescue ship "Anteo"

The Raiders and Divers Grouping "Teseo Tesei" (Raggruppamento Subacquei ed Incursori "Teseo Tesei" - COMSUBIN) in Porto Venere in Liguria is the navy's special forces unit. Headed by a Counter admiral, who reports directly to the Chief of the Navy, the command is operationally assigned to the Italian military's Joint Special Forces Operations Command.

- Grouping Headquarter (Quartier Generale del Raggruppamento)
  - Research Office
  - Telecommunications Office
  - Technical Office
  - Defense and Support Office
  - Press Office
- Operational Raiders Group (Gruppo Operativo Incursori - GOI)
- Operational Divers Group (Gruppo Operativo Subacquei - GOS)
- Special Naval Group (Gruppo Navale Speciale - COMGRUPNAVIN)
  - Cabrini-class high-speed patrol boats for the Raiders Group: "Angelo Cabrini" and "Tullio Tedeschi"
  - Marino-class diving support vessels for the Divers Group: "Mario Marino" and "Alcide Pedretti"
  - Submarine rescue ship "Anteo" with an SRV-300 deep-submergence rescue vehicle
- Schools Group (Gruppo Scuole)
  - Divers School
  - Raiders School
  - Underwater and Hyperbaric Medicine School

== Logistic Command ==
The Logistic Command (Comando Logistico della Marina Militare - MARICOMLOG) is headed by a vice admiral, who reports directly to the Chief of the Navy. Based on Nisida island near Naples the command is responsible for the logistic support of the navy's units, bases and ships, as well as for the maintenance and operation of 157 lighthouses and 667 other navigational aid lights (including seamarks and buoys).

- Logistic Command (Comando Logistico della Marina Militare - MARICOMLOG), on Nisida
  - Naval Headquarters Naples (Quartier Generale della Marina Militare Napoli - QUARTGENMARINA Napoli), on Nisida
  - New Naval Constructions Preparation Centre (Centro Allestimento Nuove Costruzioni Navali - MARINALLES), in La Spezia
  - Joint Military Applications Studies Centre (Centro Interforze Studi per le Applicazioni Militari - CISAM), in San Piero a Grado
  - Joint Advanced Ammunitions Centre (Centro Interforze Munizionamento Avanzato - CIMA), in Aulla
  - Naval Experimentation and Support Centre (Centro di Supporto e Sperimentazione Navale - CSSN), in La Spezia
    - Logistic Support Engineering Department (Reparto Ingegneria del Supporto Logistico)
    - Experimentation Department (Reparto Sperimentazione)
    - Technical-scientific Department (Reparto Tecnico Scientifico)
    - Telecommunications and Electronics Institute "Giancarlo Vallauri" (Istituto per le Telecomunicazioni e l'Elettronica "Giancarlo Vallauri"), in Livorno
  - Lighthouses Technical Office (Ufficio Tecnico dei Fari - MARITECNOFARI), in La Spezia
  - Logistics Support Command Messina (Comando Supporto Logistico della Marina Militare Messina - MARISUPLOG Messina), in Messina

=== Central and Capital Interregional Maritime Command ===
- Central and Capital Interregional Maritime Command (Comando Interregionale Marittimo Centro e Capitale - MARICAPITALE), in Rome
  - Naval Military Engineering Directorate Rome (Direzione Genio Militare per la Marina Roma - MARIGENIMIL Roma)
  - Finance Directorate Rome (Direzione di Intendenza Marina Militare Roma - MARINTENDENZA Roma)
  - Garrison Infirmary Rome (Infermeria Presidiaria di Roma - MARINFERM Roma)
  - Italian Navy Band (Banda Musicale della Marina Militare - MARIBANDA), in Rome

=== Interregional Maritime Command North ===
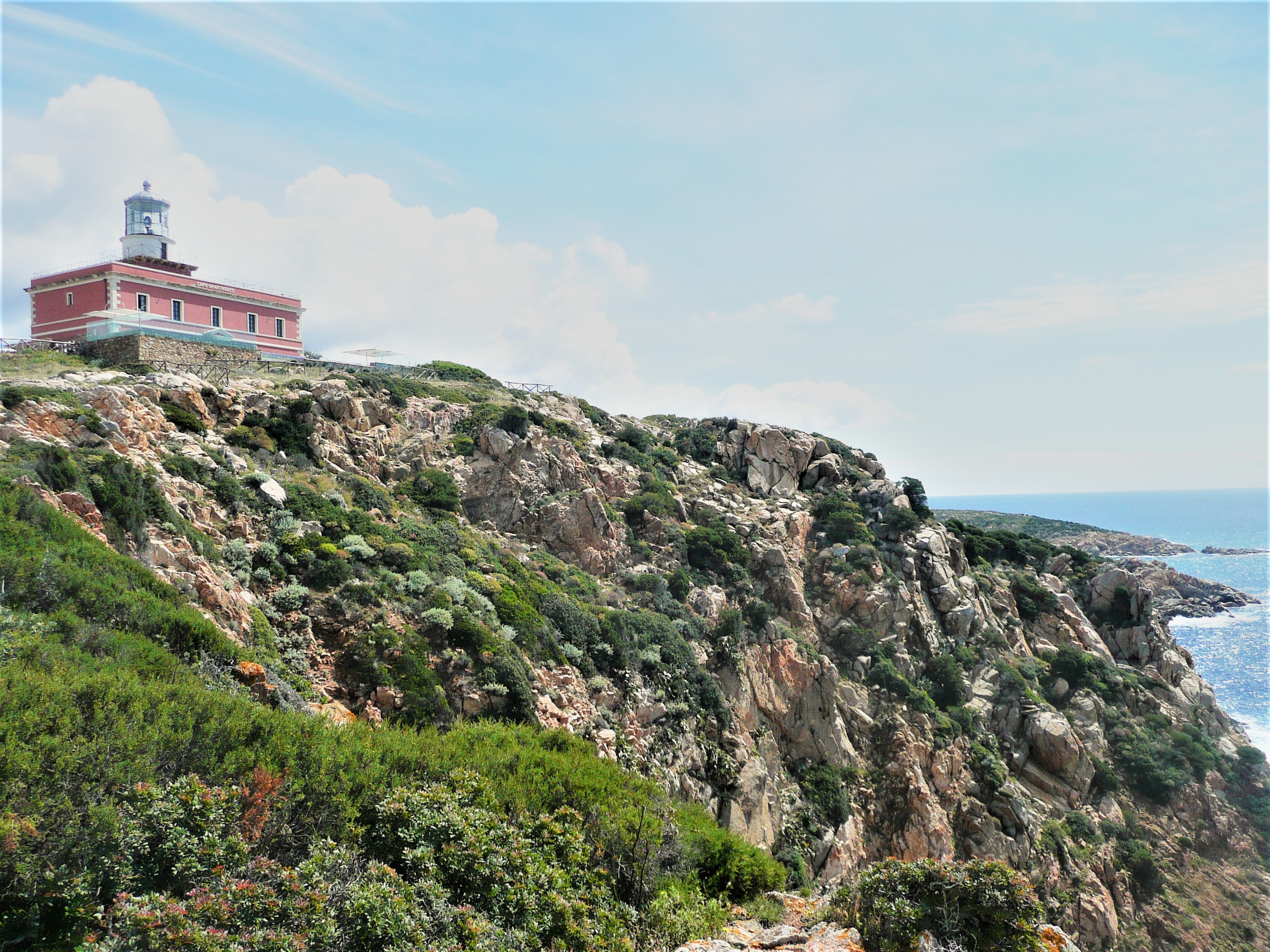
Capo Spartivento Lighthouse in Sardinia, which is operated by the Navy

- Interregional Maritime Command North (Comando Interregionale Marittimo Nord - MARINANORD), in La Spezia
  - Arsenal of La Spezia (Arsenale Militare Marittimo La Spezia - MARINARSEN La Spezia)
  - Naval Military Engineering Directorate La Spezia (Direzione Genio Militare per la Marina La Spezia - MARIGENIMIL La Spezia)
  - Naval Military Engineering Directorate Cagliari (Direzione Genio Militare per la Marina Cagliari - MARIGENIMIL Cagliari)
  - Commissariat Directorate La Spezia (Direzione di Commissariato della Marina Militare La Spezia - MARICOMMI La Spezia)
  - Marine Signals and Lighthouses Command Upper Tyrrhenian Sea (Comando Zona dei Fari e dei Segnalamenti Marittimi Alto Tirreno - MARIFARI La Spezia), in La Spezia operates 36 lighthouses and navigational aids in 36 locations of the upper Tyrrhenian Sea and Tuscan Archipelago
  - Marine Signals and Lighthouses Command Sardinia (Comando Zona dei Fari e dei Segnalamenti Marittimi della Sardegna - MARIFARI La Maddalena), in La Maddalena operates lighthouses and navigational aids in 26 locations of Sardinia
  - Marine Signals and Lighthouses Command Venice (Comando Zona dei Fari e dei Segnalamenti Marittimi di Venezia - MARIFARI Venezia) operates lighthouses and navigational aids in 24 locations of the upper Adriatic Sea
  - Ammunition Depot del Poggio (Deposito Munizioni Montagna Poggio - DEPOMUNI Poggio), in Ancona
  - Ammunition Depot Santo Stefano (Deposito Munizioni Montagna Santo Stefano - DEPOMUNI Santo Stefano), on Santo Stefano island
  - Garrison Infirmary La Spezia (Infermeria Presidiaria di La Spezia - MARINFERM La Spezia)
  - Autonomous Maritime Command West (Comando Marittimo Autonomo Ovest - MARINA OVEST), in Cagliari

=== Interregional Maritime Command South ===
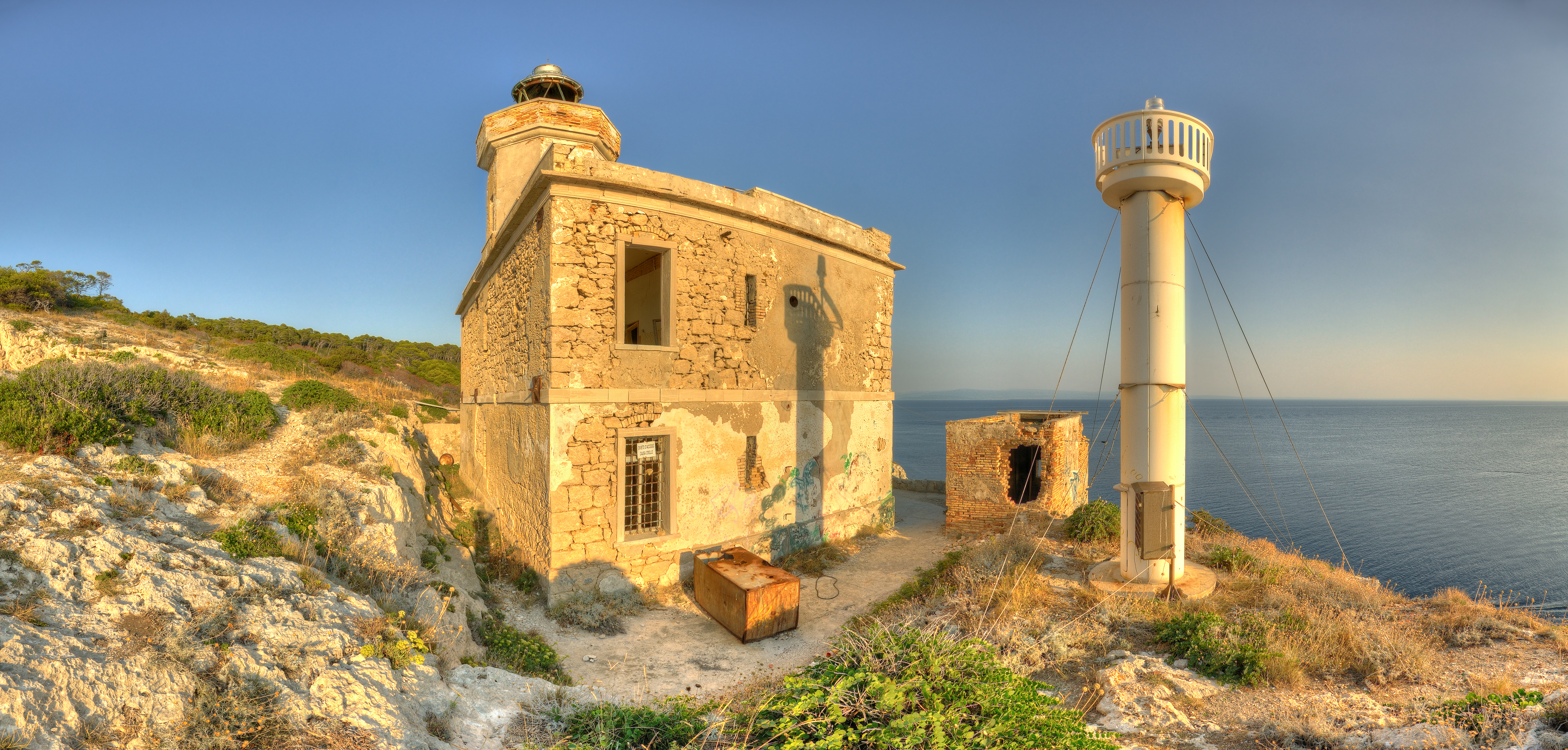
Punta del Diavolo Lighthouse in Apulia, which is operated by the Navy

- Interregional Maritime Command South (Comando Interregionale Marittimo Sud - MARINASUD), in Taranto
  - Arsenal of Taranto (Arsenale Militare Marittimo Taranto - MARINARSEN Taranto)
  - Military Hospital Centre Taranto (Centro Ospedaliero Militare Taranto - MARISPEDAL Taranto)
  - Naval Military Engineering Directorate Taranto (Direzione Genio Militare per la Marina Taranto - MARIGENIMIL Taranto)
  - Commissariat Directorate Taranto (Direzione di Commissariato della Marina Militare Taranto - MARICOMMI Taranto)
  - Administration Directorate Taranto (Direzione di Amministrazione della Marina Militare Taranto - MARIDIRAM Taranto)
  - Finance Directorate Brindisi (Direzione di Intendenza Marina Militare Brindisi - MARINTENDENZA Brindisi)
  - Ammunition Directorate Taranto (Direzione di Munizionamento della Marina Militare Taranto - DIREMUNI Taranto)
  - Marine Signals and Lighthouses Command Naples (Comando Zona dei Fari e dei Segnalamenti Marittimi di Napoli - MARIFARI Napoli) operates lighthouses and navigational aids in 28 locations of the lower Tyrrhenian Sea
  - Marine Signals and Lighthouses Command Taranto (Comando Zona dei Fari e dei Segnalamenti Marittimi di Taranto - MARIFARI Taranto) operates lighthouses and navigational aids in 25 locations of the lower Adriatic Sea and Western Ionian Sea
  - Ammunition Depot Montagna Spaccata (Deposito Munizioni Montagna Spaccata - DEPOMUNI Montagna Spaccata), in Pozzuoli
  - Garrison Infirmary Augusta (Infermeria Presidiaria di Taranto - MARINFERM Taranto)
  - Navy Rowing Sports Center Sabaudia (Centro Sportivo Remiero della Marina Militare Sabaudia - MARIREMO Sabaudia)

=== Maritime Command Sicily ===
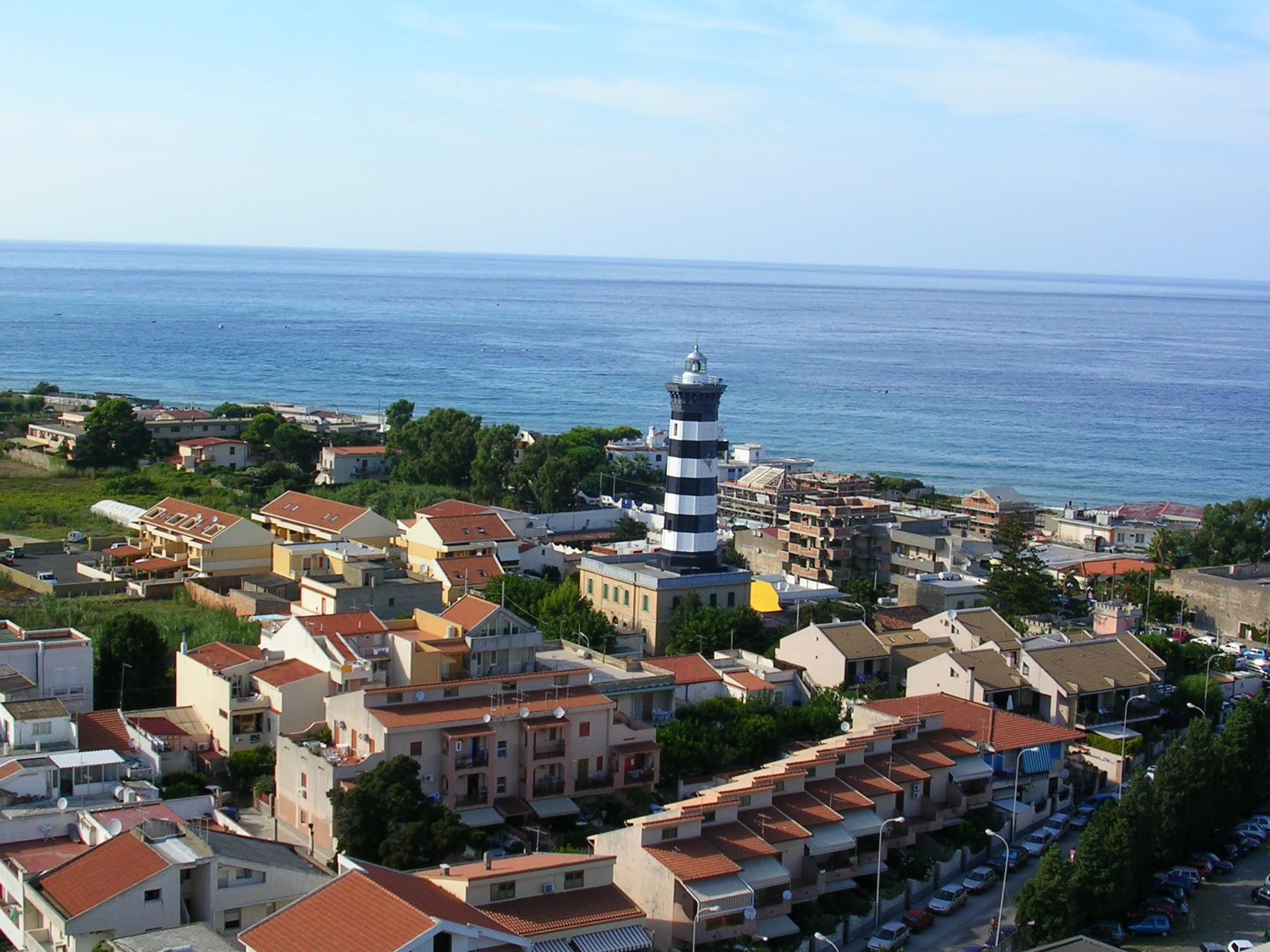
Capo Peloro lighthouse in Sicily, which is operated by the Navy

- Maritime Command Sicily (Comando Marittimo Sicilia - MARISICILIA), in Augusta
  - Arsenal of Augusta (Arsenale Militare Marittimo Augusta - MARINARSEN Augusta)
  - Naval Military Engineering Directorate Augusta (Direzione Genio Militare per la Marina Augusta - MARIGENIMIL Augusta)
  - Ammunition Directorate Cava di Sorciaro (Direzione di Munizionamento della Marina Militare Cava di Sorciaro - DIREMUNI Cava di Sorciaro), in Priolo Gargallo
  - Finance Directorate Augusta (Direzione di Intendenza Marina Militare Augusta - MARINTENDENZA Augusta)
  - Marine Signals and Lighthouses Command Sicily (Comando Zona dei Fari e dei Segnalamenti Marittimi della Sicilia - MARIFARI Messina), in Messina operates lighthouses and navigational aids in 50 locations of the lower Tyrrhenian Sea, Western Ionian Sea, and the Strait of Sicily
  - Garrison Infirmary Augusta (Infermeria Presidiaria di Augusta - MARINFERM Augusta)

== Schools Command ==
The Schools Command is headed by a vice admiral, who reports directly to the Chief of the Navy. Based in Ancona the command is responsible for the selection, formation, training, and education of the navy's personnel.

- Schools Command (Comando Scuole della Marina Militare - MARICOMSCUOLE), in Ancona
  - Naval Headquarters Ancona (Quartier Generale della Marina Militare Ancona - QUARTGENMARINA Ancona)
  - Maritime Military Studies Institute (Istituto di Studi Militari Marittimi - MARISTUDI), in Venice
  - Naval Academy (Accademia Navale - MARINACCAD), in Livorno
    - Sail training vessels: "Capricia", "Caroly", "Corsaro II", "Orsa Maggiore", "Stella Polare"
  - Petty Officers School La Maddalena (Scuola Sottufficiali della Marina Militare La Maddalena - MARISCUOLA La Maddalena)
  - Petty Officers School Taranto (Scuola Sottufficiali della Marina Militare Taranto - MARISCUOLA Taranto)
  - Naval Military School "Francesco Morosini" (Scuola Navale Militare "Francesco Morosini" - MARISCUOLANAV), in Venice
  - Armed Forces Telecommunications School (Scuola Telecomunicazioni delle Forze Armate), in Chiavari
  - Selection Centre (Centro di Selezione della Marina Militare - MARICENSELEZ), in Ancona
  - Commissariat Directorate Ancona (Direzione di Commissariato della Marina Militare Ancona - MARICOMMI Ancona)
  - Naval Military Engineering Schools Section (Sezione del Genio Militare per la Marina Militare Scuole - MARISEZGENIOSCUOLE)

== Hydrographic Institute ==
The Hydrographic Institute (Istituto Idrografico della Marina Militare Genova - MARIDROGRAFICO Genova) in Genoa is Italy's national hydrographic, and bathymetric authority. Headed by a counter admiral the institute publishes all official nautical and navigational documentation in Italy and therefore performs regular surveys of the Italian coasts and seas. The institute operates three hydrographic survey vessels: the "Ammiraglio Magnaghi", which will be replaced by a new Major Hydro-oceanographic Ship - NIOM, and the two Ninfe-class hydrographic survey vessels "Aretusa" and "Galatea".

== Inspector of Aviation for the Navy ==
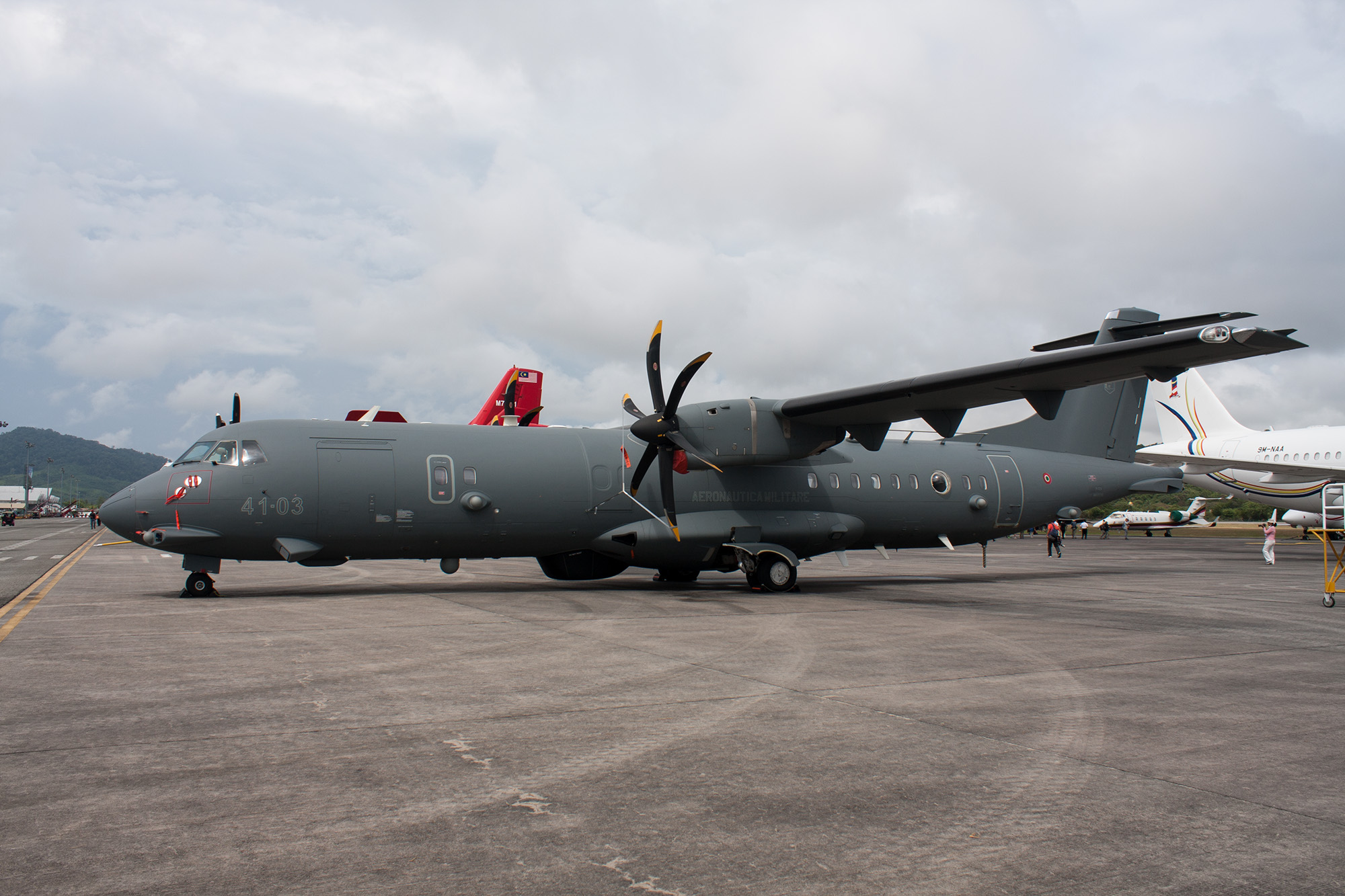
P-72A ASW 41-03 of the 41st Anti-Submarine Wing

The Inspector of Aviation for the Navy (Ispettore dell’Aviazione per la Marina - ISPAVIAMAR) reports to the Chief of the Air Force General Staff and the Chief of the Navy General Staff. ISPAVIAMAR oversees the technical and logistic aeronautical aspects, and the training of the Italian military's airborne anti-submarine forces. The inspector is a brigadier general of the air force, whose office and staff reside in the navy's headquarter in Rome. The only unit assigned to ISPAVIAMAR is the 41° Stormo AntiSom Athos Ammannato, which is under operational control of the Italian Navy.

- Inspector of Aviation for the Navy (Ispettore dell’Aviazione per la Marina - ISPAVIAMAR)
  - 41st Anti-Submarine Wing "Athos Ammannato" (41° Stormo AntiSom "Athos Ammannato"), at Sigonella Air Base
    - 86th Crew Training Center Group (86° Gruppo Centro Addestramento Equipaggi)
    - 88th Anti-Submarine Group (88° Gruppo AntiSom), with 4 × P-72A ASW
    - Aircraft Efficiency Group (Gruppo Efficienza Aeromobili)
    - Force Protection Group (Gruppo Protezione delle Forze)
    - Logistics Unit (Reparto Logistica)

== Geographic distribution ==
Italian Navy main bases 2020:
Fleet bases Naval aviation bases Other bases Radar stations Signal stations
