= Italian ship Aretusa =

Aretusa was the name of at least three ships of the Italian Navy and may refer to:

- Italian cruiser Aretusa, a Partenope-class cruiser launched in 1891 and discarded in 1912.
- Italian torpedo boat Aretusa, a Spica-class torpedo boat launched in 1938 and stricken in 1958.
- Italian survey vessel Aretusa (A 5304), an Ninfe-class research vessel launched in 2000.
