= Italian ship Vedetta =

Vedetta was the name of at least three ships of the Italian Navy and may refer to:

- Italian aviso Vedetta (1862), an aviso in service 1862-1903 (it:Vedetta (avviso))
- Italian corvette Vedetta (F 597), a Le Fougueux-class corvette launched in 1954 for the German Navy, transferred in 1957 to Ethiopia as Zerai Deres, returned to the United States shortly after and renamed USS PC-1616. Transferred to Italy in 1959 as Vedetta and decommissioned in 1978.
- Italian patrol boat Vedetta (P 407), an Esploratore-class patrol boat launched in 1997.
