= Italian ship UIOM =

History

Italy
- Name: UIOM
- Namesake: Unità Idro Oceanografica Maggiore - Main ocean going hydrographic vessel
- Builder: Fincantieri
- Status: Planned to replace Italian ship Ammiraglio Magnaghi (A5303) from 2020

General characteristics
- Type: Hydrographic survey
- Displacement: about 3.600 t (3.543 long tons).
- Length: - 94 m (308 ft 5 in) LOA; - 80 m (260 ft) LPP
- Beam: 16.6 m (54 ft 6 in)
- Depth: 8.50 m (27 ft 11 in)
- Propulsion: - CODAD scheme; - 2 x diesel engines; - 3 x diesel engines generators; - 1 x emergency diesel engine generator; - 2 x shaft
- Speed: 18 knots (33 km/h; 21 mph)
- Range: 5,000 nmi (9,300 km; 5,800 mi) to 14 knots (26 km/h; 16 mph)
- Endurance: 20 days
- Complement: accommodations for 80
- Sensors & processing systems: - Lenardo CMS SADOC Mk4; - Integrated Navigation System; - Int/Ext Communication System; - 1 x Multi Beam Echo-Sound
- Notes: - flight deck for SH90A helicopter types; - hangar for SH90A helicopter types; - 4 x hydrographic boats; - 2 x RHIBs

UIOM is a planned ocean-going hydrographic survey vessel of the Marina Militare to replace Italian ship Ammiraglio Magnaghi (A5303) from 2020

== Characteristics ==
UIOM will be a multipurpose vessel with various operational capabilities, including:

- hydrographic and oceanographic surveying;
- humanitarian intervention (evacuation) and medical support operations;
- maritime search and rescue including diving activities;
- command and control platform;
- mine countermeasures (MCM) operations management;
- helicopter and boat operations.

Driving design parameters are the efficiency in the whole speed range, extended range, remarkable seaworthiness performances. Due to the optimization of spaces, the ship is highly flexible in terms of configuration, embarked equipment and capabilities. UIOM will be able to embark a few standard ISO1C containers, 20 ft (6.1 m).

== See also ==
- Research vessel
