= Gorgona-class transport ship =

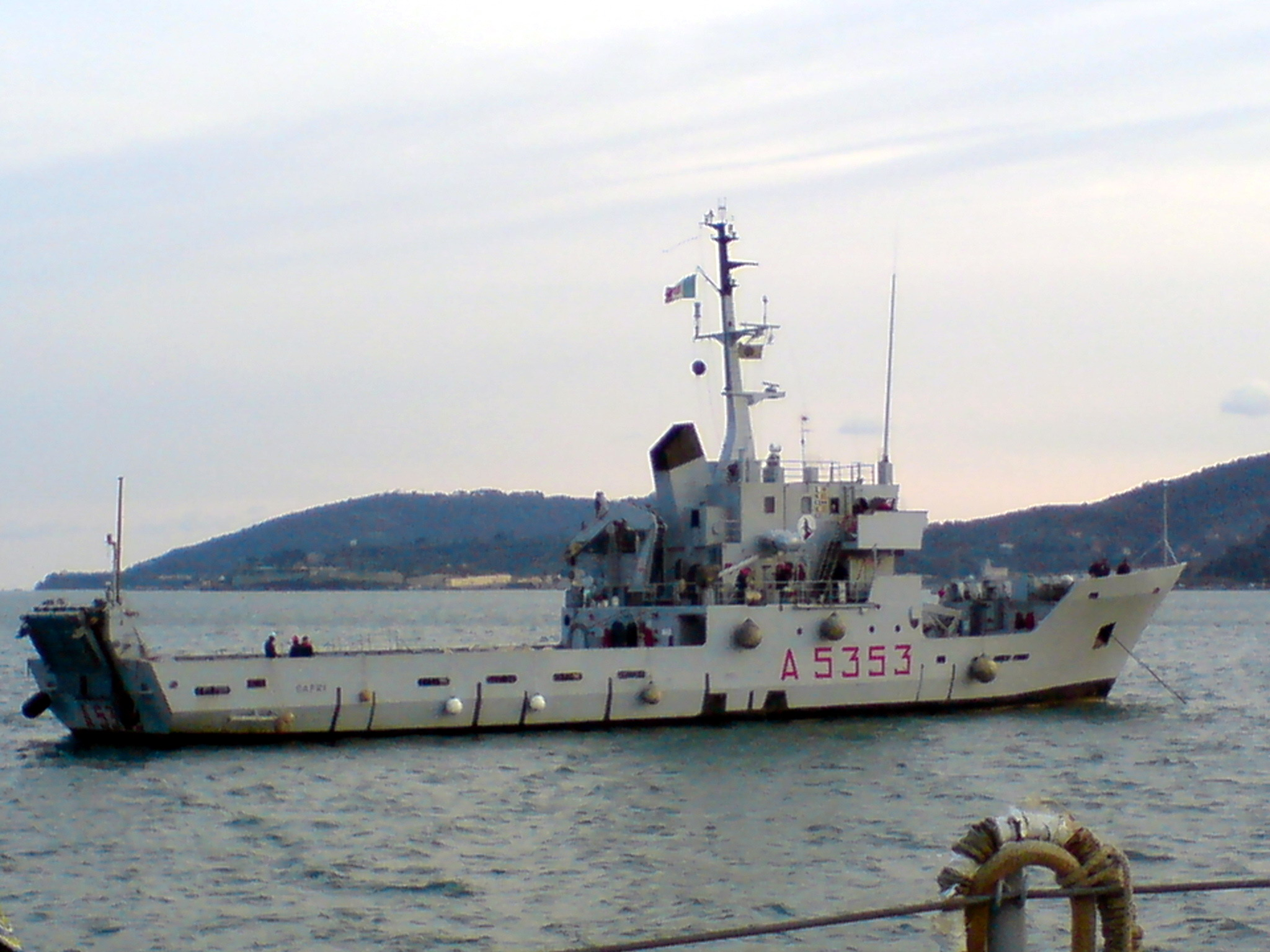
- Coastal oil tanker Capri (A 5353), 2007

Class overview
- Name: Gorgona
- Builders: Cantiere Navale Mario Morini, Ancona
- Operators: Italian Navy
- In commission: 1986-1987
- Planned: 6
- Completed: 6
- Active: 6

General characteristics
- Type: Coastal Transport ship
- Displacement: - 631 t (621 long tons) / 799.6 t (787.0 long tons) full load; - 460.27 t (453.00 long tons) empty
- Length: 56.72 m (186 ft 1 in) LOA
- Beam: 10.00 m (32 ft 10 in)
- Draught: 2.60 m (8 ft 6 in)
- Installed power: - 2 x diesel engines Isotta Fraschini ID-36-8V, 647 kW (868 bhp) each; - 2 x diesel engines generators AIFO 8281-SRM-8V, 235 kW (315 bhp) each with Ansaldo electric engine MXR-315, 380V; - 1 x diesel engine generator AIFO 8210-M6, 110 kW (150 bhp) with Ansaldo electric engine MXR-250, 380 V
- Propulsion: - 2 x shaft and thruster; - 1 x Auxiliary bow thruster
- Speed: 14 knots (26 km/h; 16 mph)
- Range: 1,800 nmi (3,300 km; 2,100 mi)
- Crew: 34 (of which 2 officers)
- Sensors & processing systems: 2 x GEM Elettronica MM/SPN-753 navigation radar

The Gorgona class is a series of six Coastal Transport ships of the Italian Navy, named as Moto Trasporto Costiero, MTC.

== Roles ==
Coastal roll-on/roll-off ship:

- minelayer
- containers transport
- troop transport
- wheeled vehicles transport
- tracked vehicles transport
- hydrofoils logistic support (for Sparviero hydrofoils class until 2002)
- logistic support to expeditionary missions
- drinking water and fuel supply for vessels, islands and military barracks

== Ships ==
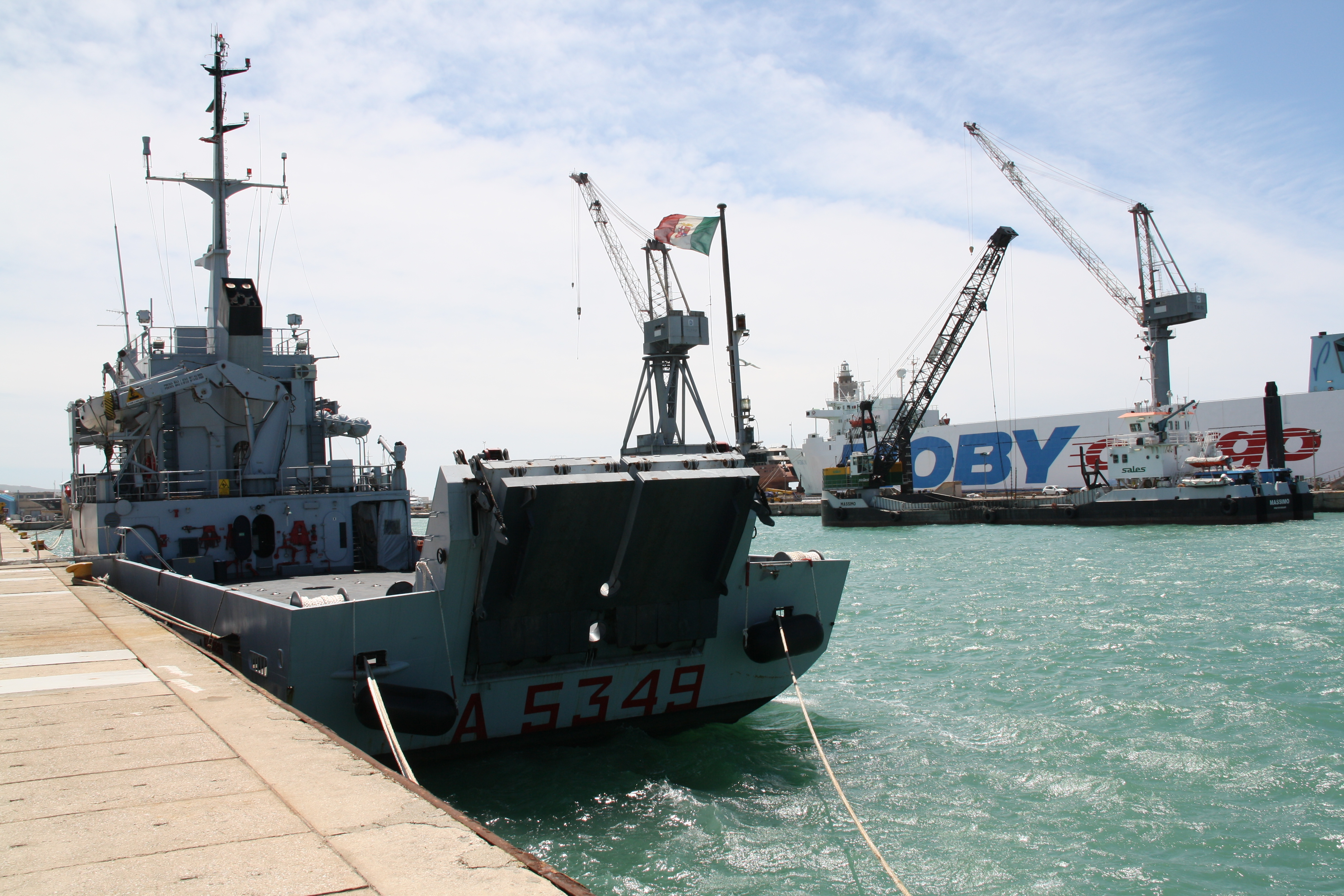
Caprera (A 5349) in 2013 in Port of Livorno

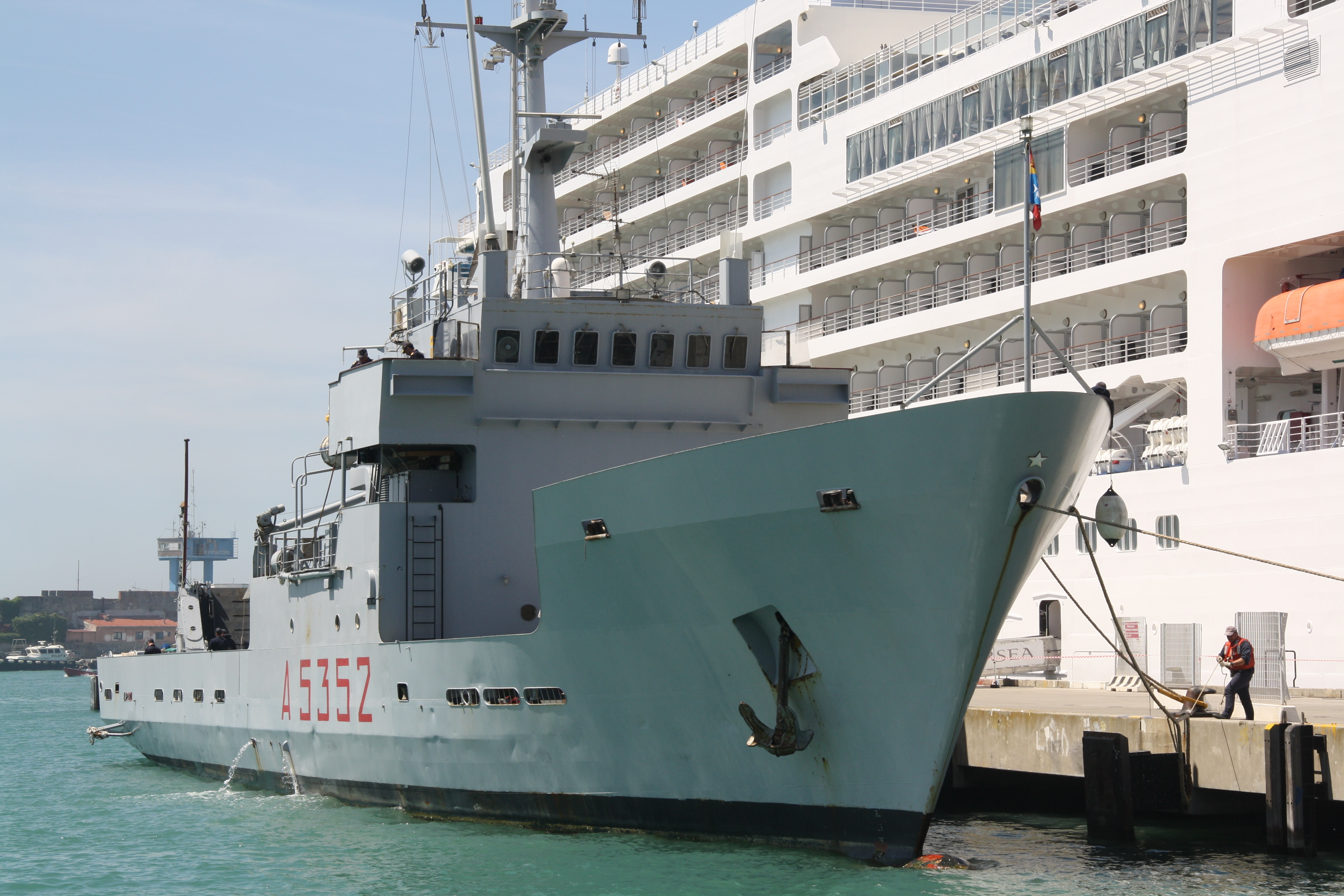
Lipari (A 5352) in 2015

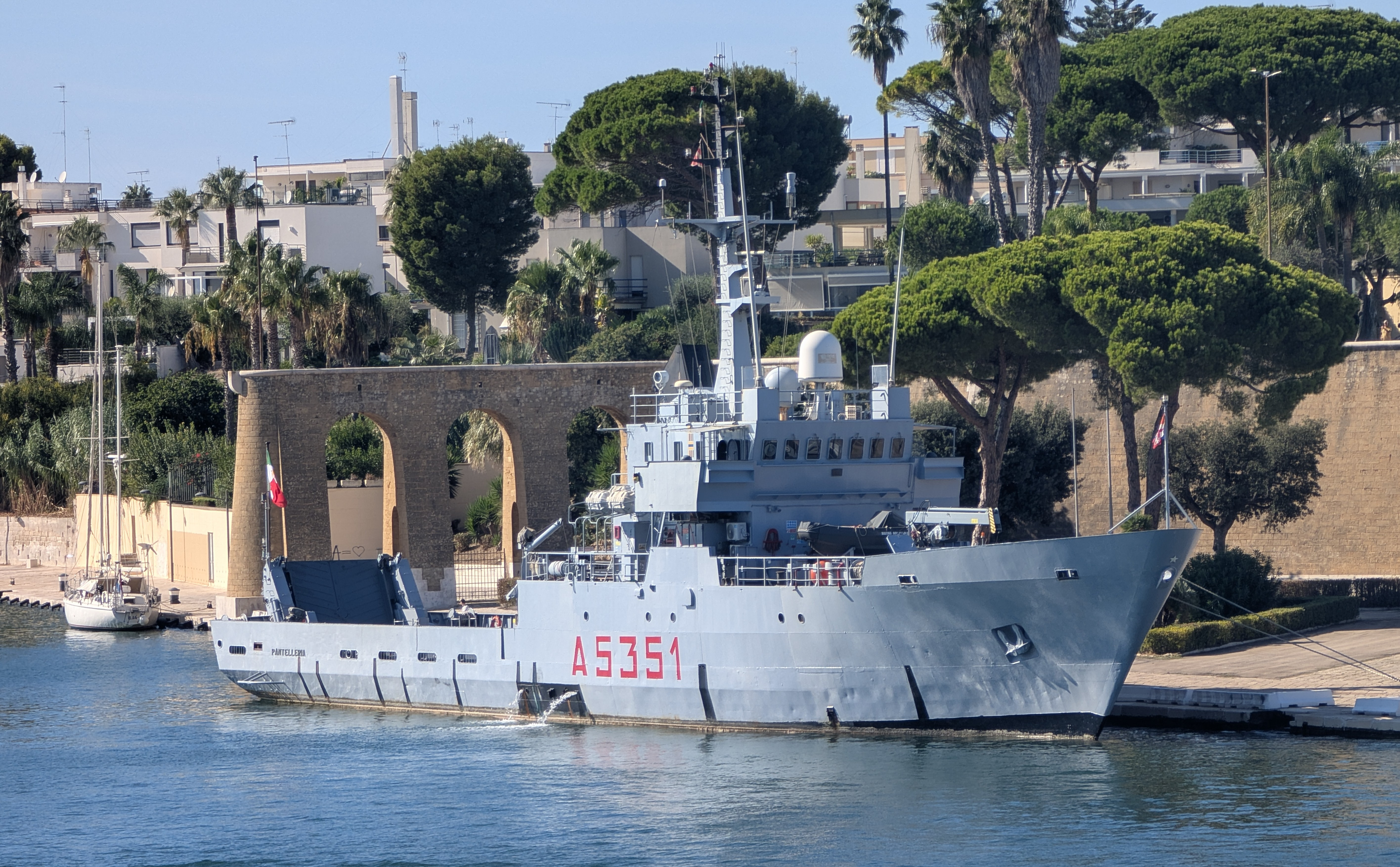
Pantelleria (A 5351) in 2025 in Port of Brindisi

Italian Navy - Gorgona class
Name	Pennant number	Hull number	Displacement tonnes, f.l.	Laid down	Launched	Commissioned	Notes	Initial number
Gorgona	A 5347	218	799,6	1985	12 July 1986	23 December 1986	MLU in 1992	MTC-1011
Tremiti	A 5348	219	705,7	24 April 1985	13 September 1986	2 March 1987	MLU in 1988; 18 more beds	MTC-1012
Caprera	A 5349	220	631	24 June 1985	8 November 1986	10 April 1987		MTC-1013
Pantelleria	A 5351	221	798,32	1985	31 January 1987	26 May 1987	MLU in 1992	MTC-1014
Lipari	A 5352	222	631	1985	7 May 1987	10 July 1987		MTC-1015
Capri	A 5353	223	706	19 December 1985	18 June 1987	16 September 1987		MTC-1016
