= Porto-class tugboat =

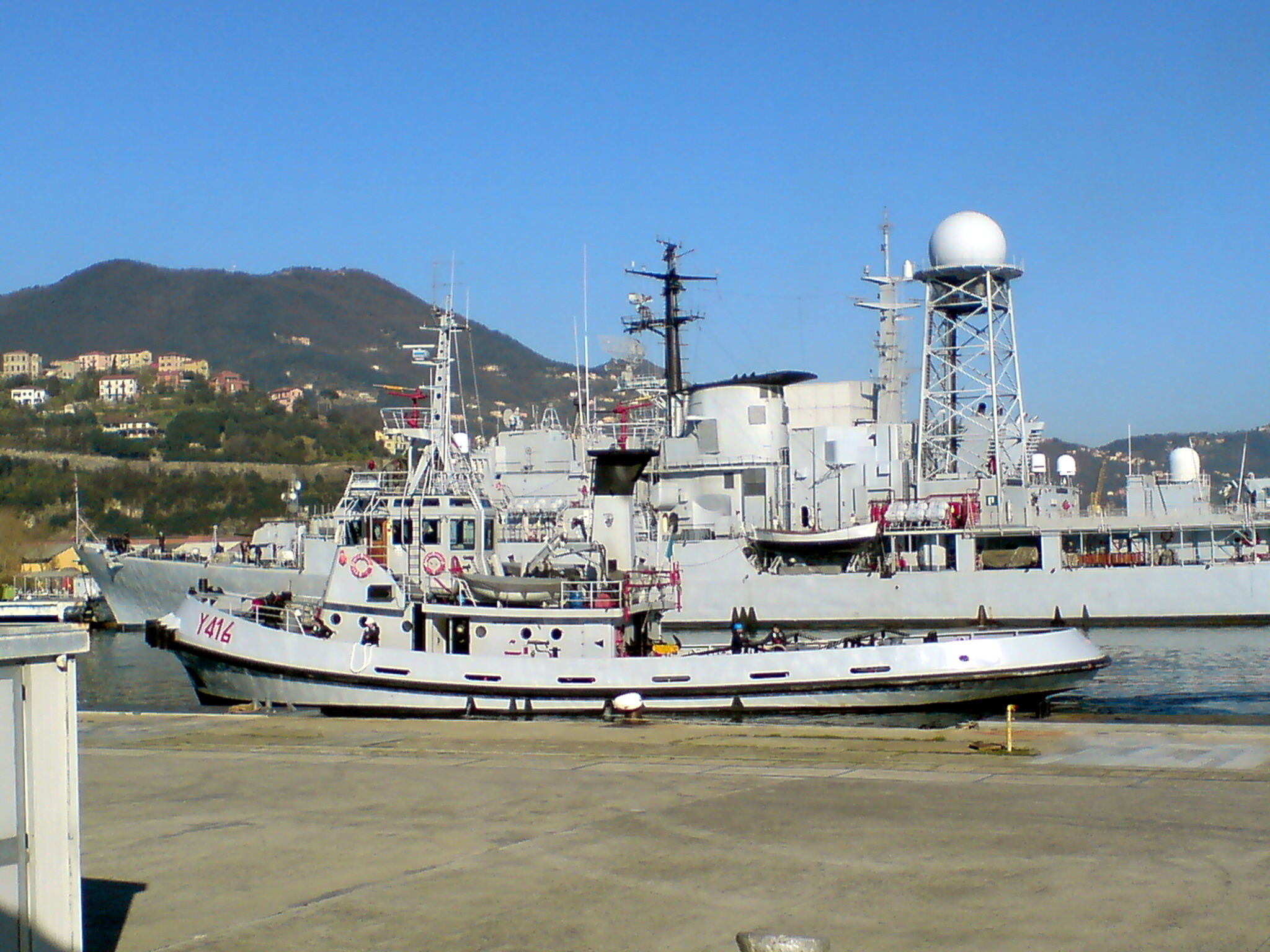

Class overview
- Name: Porto class
- Builders: Cantiere Navale Giacalone (Naples) and Cantiere Navale De Poli Pellestrina (Venice)
- Operators: Italian Navy
- Planned: 9
- Completed: 9
- Active: 9

General characteristics
- Type: Coastal tugboat
- Displacement: 412 t (405 long tons) full load
- Length: 32.4 m (106 ft 4 in) LOA
- Beam: 8.5 m (27 ft 11 in)
- Draught: 3.3 m (10 ft 10 in)
- Propulsion: - 1 x diesel engines Grandi Motori Trieste GMT BL-230-8M, 1,177 kW (1,578 hp); - 2 x diesel engines generators, 200 kW (270 hp)
- Speed: 11.5 knots (21.3 km/h; 13.2 mph)
- Range: 1,800 nautical miles (3,300 km; 2,100 mi) at 11.5 knots (21.3 km/h; 13.2 mph)
- Complement: 12
- Sensors & processing systems: 2 x navigation radar GEM Elettronica SPN-748
- Notes: can be fitted with echo-sounder Honeywell-Elac Nautik LAZ-50

The Porto class of coastal tugboats consists of nine units operated by the Marina Militare Italiana, named as Rimorchiatore Costiero.

== Ships ==
These units are usable for relief, rescue and fire fighting.

Italian Navy – Porto class
Name	Pennant number	Shypyard	Laid down	Launched	Commissioned	Notes
Porto Fossone	Y 415	Cantiere Navale De Poli Pellestrina (Venice)	1983		1985	
Porto Torres	Y 416	Cantiere Navale Giacalone (Naples)	1983		January 1991	
Porto Corsini	Y 417	Cantiere Navale De Poli Pellestrina (Venice)	1983		1985	
Porto Empedocle	Y 421	Cantiere Navale De Poli Pellestrina (Venice)	1983	14 December 1985	1985	
Porto Pisano	Y 422	Cantiere Navale De Poli Pellestrina (Venice)	1983	20 August 1985	1985	
Porto Conte	Y 423	Cantiere Navale De Poli Pellestrina (Venice)	1983	20 September 1985	1985	
Portoferraio	Y 425	Cantiere Navale De Poli Pellestrina (Venice)	1983	3 April 1985	1985	
Portovenere	Y 426	Cantiere Navale Giacalone (Naples)	1983	17 February 1985	1985	
Porto Salvo	Y 428	Cantiere Navale Giacalone (Naples)	1983	4 July 1985	1985	
