= Punta Sottile Lighthouse =

Punta Sottile
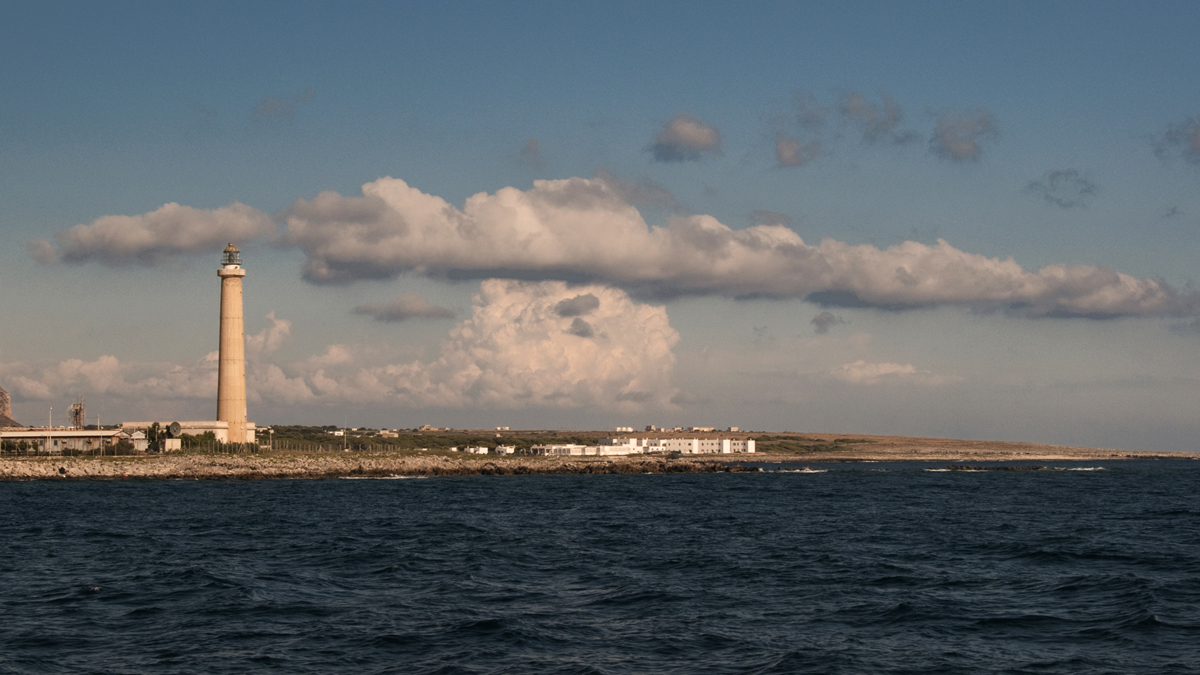
- Punta Sottile Lighthouse
- Location: Punta Sottile; Favignana; Sicily; Italy
- Coordinates: 37°56′06″N 12°16′20″E

Tower
- Constructed: 1860 (first)
- Construction: tuff tower
- Height: 38 metres (125 ft)
- Shape: tapered cylindrical tower with balcony and lantern atop 1-storey keeper's house
- Markings: unpainted tower, grey lantern dome
- Power source: mains electricity
- Operator: Marina Militare

Light
- First lit: 1904 (current)
- Focal height: 43 metres (141 ft)
- Lens: type OR S4 focal length: 250 mm
- Intensity: AL 1000 W
- Range: main: 25 nautical miles (46 km; 29 mi) reserve: 15 nautical miles (28 km; 17 mi)
- Characteristic: Fl W 8s.
- Italy no.: 3104 E.F.

Punta Sottile Lighthouse (Italian: Faro di Punta Sottile) is an active lighthouse on the Favignana Island placed at the extremity of Punta Sottile, the westernmost point of the Island.

== Description ==
The first lighthouse was built in 1860 and had the shape like a turret, it was managed by Civil Engineering of Palermo.

In 1904 was practically rebuilt in tuff from San Vito Lo Capo taking the current aspect of a tapered cylinder with balcony and lantern. Inside is a spiral staircase formed by 200 lead reinforced steps. The Regia Marina managed the lighthouse since 1912 and in 1935 the tower underwent to works in order to reduce its high to the present 38 metres (125 ft). The lighthouse emits one white flash in an eight-second period, visible up to 25 nautical miles (46 km; 29 mi). The light is operated by the Lighthouses Service of the Marina Militare and it is identified by the Country code number 3104 E.F.

== See also ==
- List of lighthouses in Italy
