= Ciclope-class tugboat =

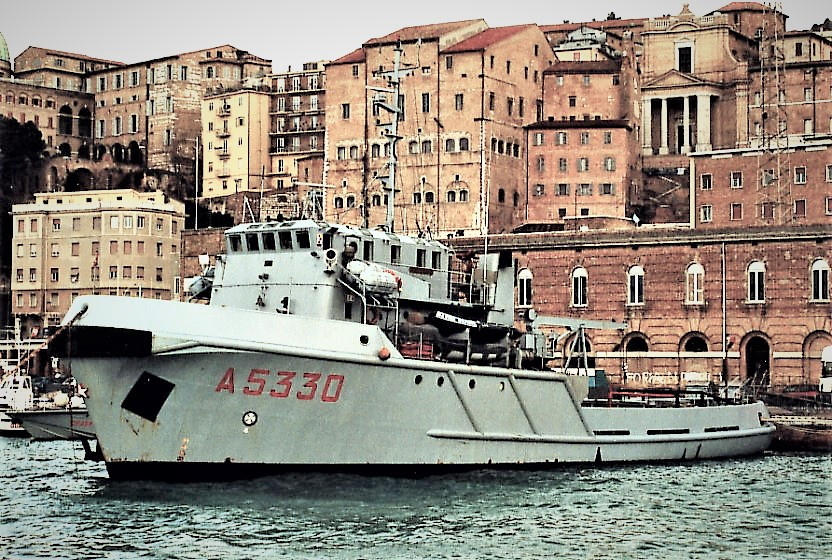
- Saturno (A 5330)

Class overview
- Name: Ciclope class
- Builders: Cantiere Navale Ferrari (La Spezia)
- Operators: Italian Navy
- In commission: 1985-1988
- Planned: 6
- Completed: 6
- Active: 6

General characteristics
- Type: Deep sea tugboat
- Displacement: 660 t (650 long tons) full load
- Length: 38.95 m (127.8 ft) LOA
- Beam: 9.8 m (32 ft)
- Draught: 3.8 m (12 ft)
- Propulsion: - 2 x diesel engines Grandi Motori Trieste BL-230-8 M, 1,963 kW (2,632 hp); - 2 x diesel engines generators Isotta Fraschini V1312/MH14; - 1 x emergency diesel engine generator Isotta Fraschini V1308/MH14
- Speed: 14.5 knots (26.9 km/h; 16.7 mph)
- Range: 4,000 nautical miles (7,400 km; 4,600 mi) at 12 knots (22 km/h; 14 mph)
- Crew: 24
- Sensors & processing systems: 2 x navigation radar GEM Elettronica SPN-748

The Ciclope class of deep sea tugboats consists of six units operated by the Marina Militare Italiana, named as Rimorchiatore d'Altura.

== Ships ==
These units are usable for relief, rescue and fire fighting.

Italian Navy - Ciclope class
Name	Pennant number	Laid down	Launched	Commissioned
Ciclope	A 5319		1985	
Gigante	A 5328		23 May 1985	
Polifemo	A 5325	1986	1987	1988
Titano	A 5324		2 March 1985	
Saturno	A 5330	1985	1985	1987
Tenace	A 5365		1988	
