= Esploratore-class patrol boat =

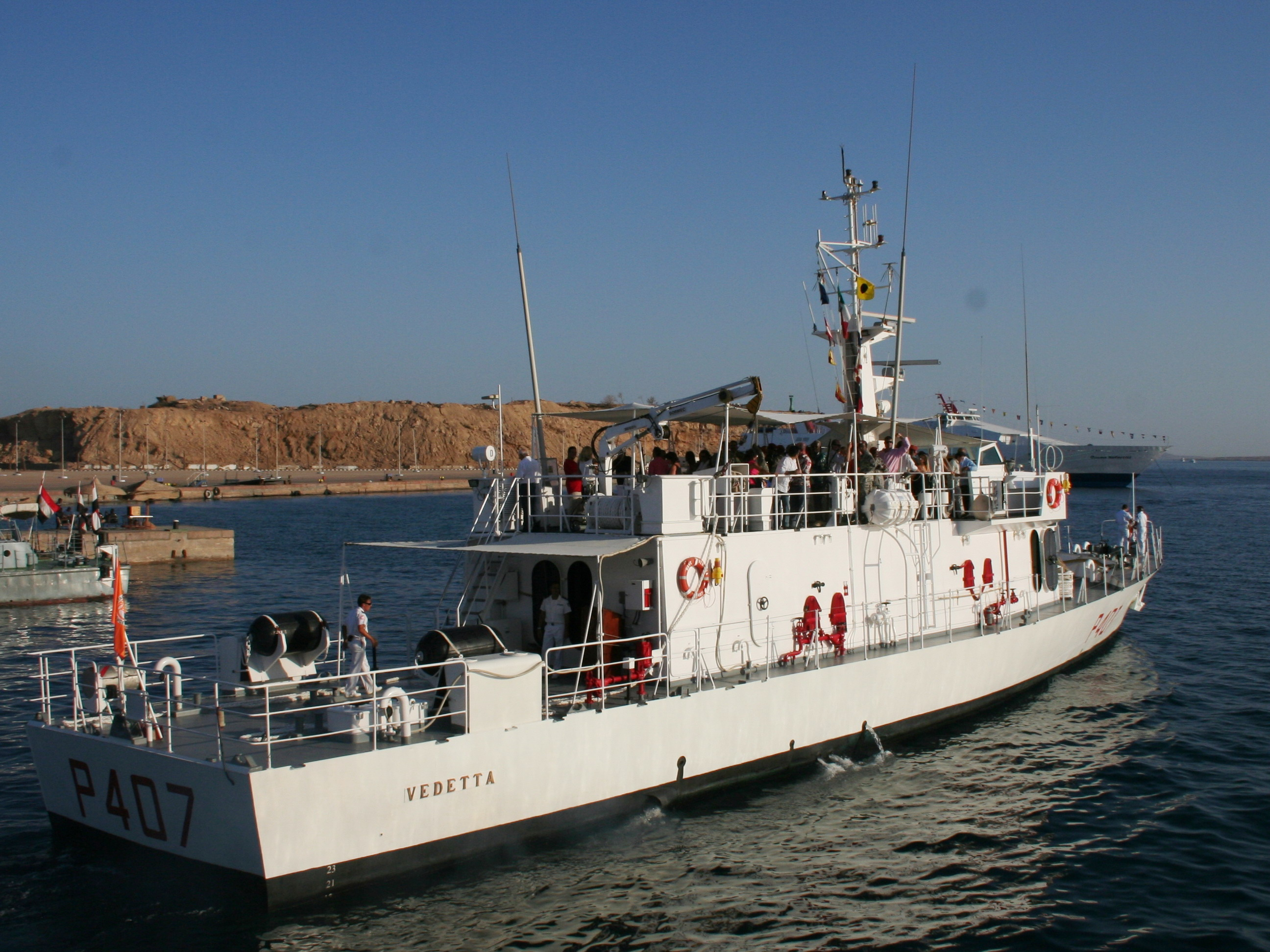
- Patrol ship Vedetta (P 407), Tiran strait, 2007

Class overview
- Name: Esploratore class
- Builders: Cantieri Navali Istria, CLEMNA and SIMAN Srl in Cadimare, La Spezia
- Operators: Italian Navy
- In commission: 1997–2005
- Building: 4
- Active: 4

General characteristics
- Type: Patrol vessel
- Displacement: - 181.5 t (178.6 long tons) standard; - 211 t (208 long tons) full load
- Length: - 37.16 m (121 ft 11 in) LOA; - 34.65 m (113 ft 8 in) LPP
- Beam: 7.06 m (23 ft 2 in)
- Draught: 1.90 m (6 ft 3 in)
- Propulsion: - 2 shafts; - 2 x diesel engines Isotta Fraschini V-1712-T2-MD 3,260 kW (4,370 bhp); - 2 x diesel engines generator Scania, 135 kW (181 bhp) each
- Speed: 20 knots (37 km/h; 23 mph) maximum
- Range: 2,000 nmi (3,700 km; 2,300 mi) at 8 knots (15 km/h; 9.2 mph)
- Crew: 16 (2 officers, 14 sailors)
- Sensors & processing systems: 2 x GEM Elettronica navigation radars
- Armament: 1 x 12,7 mm Browning M2HB (A61ADF); 2 × 7,62 mm MG 42/59 machine guns

The Esploratore class is a series of four coastal patrol boats of the Italian Navy. They were designed and built specifically for use by the Multinational Force and Observers (MFO) peace-keeping mission in the Sinai (Red Sea). The mission is to guarantee freedom of navigation in the Straits of Tiran, safeguard human life at sea and protect the marine environment. Compared to the Alberi class they replaced, these ships feature lighter displacement, improved speed, longer range, and a crew requirement reduced by 40%.

== Ships ==
Italian Navy – Esploratore class
Ship	Pennant number	Hull number	Shipyard	Laid Down	Launched	Commissioned	Motto
Esploratore	P 405	195	Istria, Cadimare La Spezia	14 February 1995	4 November 1996	14 July 1997	Videx post fata surgo
Sentinella	P 406	196	Istria, Cadimare La Spezia	14 February 1995	13 November 1997	10 July 1998	All'erta sto
Vedetta	P 407	197	CLEMNA, Cadimare La Spezia	14 February 1995	11 January 1997	29 July 1999	Cor meum vigilat
Staffetta	P 408		SIMAN Srl, Cadimare La Spezia	24 May 1997	12 January 2001	6 July 2005	Ubi navis ibi Patria
