= Ninfe-class research vessel =

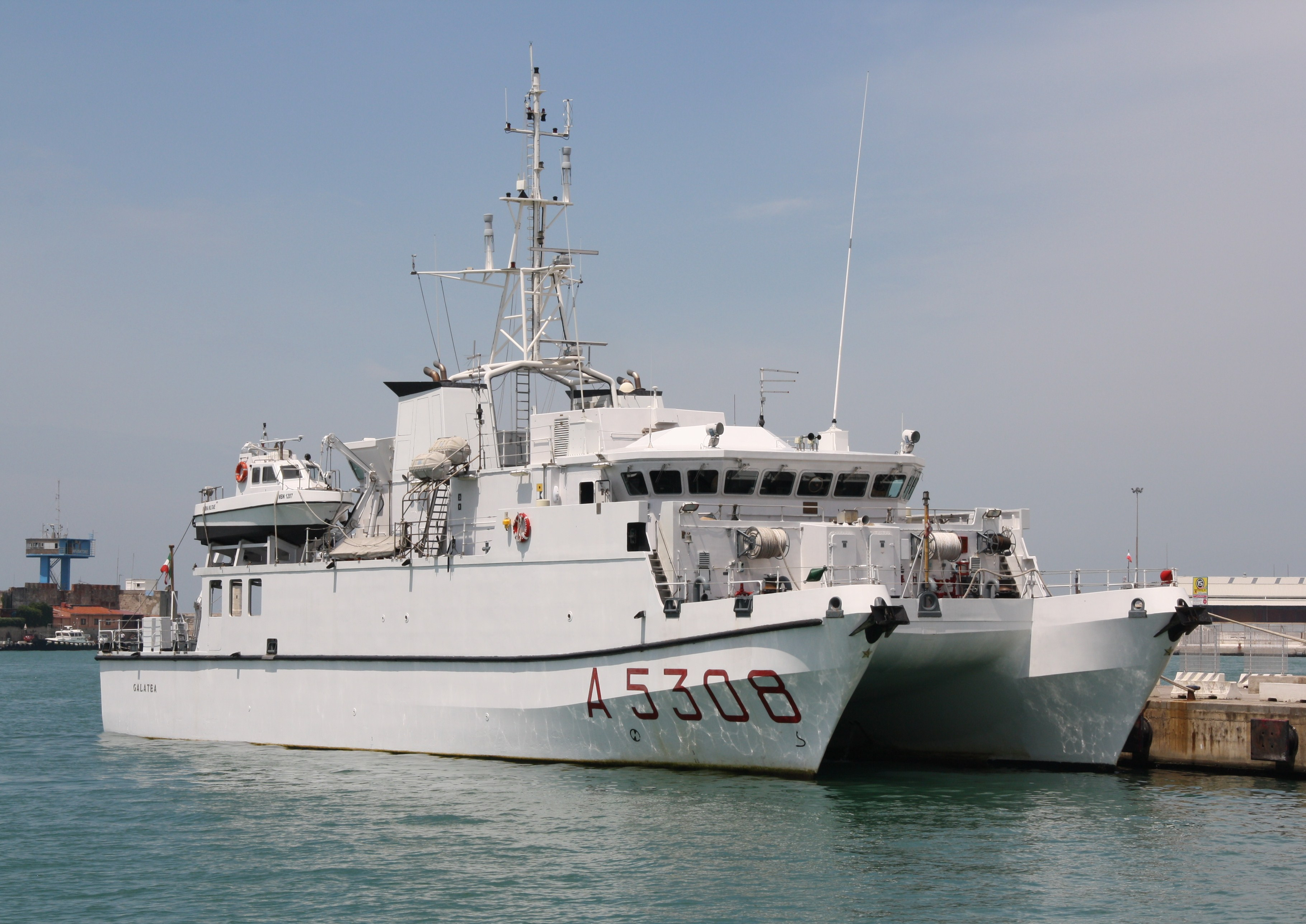
- Galatea at the Port of Livorno, 2013

Class overview
- Name: Ninfe class
- Builders: Intermarine, Sarzana (La Spezia)
- Operators: Italian Navy
- Preceded by: Mirto and Pioppo
- In commission: 2002
- Planned: 2
- Completed: 2
- Active: 2

General characteristics
- Type: Survey vessel
- Displacement: 415 t (408 long tons) full load
- Length: 39.21 m (128 ft 8 in) LOA
- Beam: 12.6 m (41 ft 4 in)
- Draught: 2.5 m (8 ft 2 in)
- Propulsion: - 2 x diesel engines Isotta Fraschini V1708-T2-ME (1,396 kW (1,872 hp) each) with ABB/Marelli generator; - 2 x diesel engine AIFO GE8210M22, for harbour duties; - 2 x Schottel STP-300 azimuthal propellers; - 2 Schottel bow thrusters
- Speed: 13 knots (24 km/h; 15 mph)
- Range: 1,700 nmi (3,100 km; 2,000 mi) at 13 knots (24 km/h; 15 mph)
- Complement: 31
- Sensors & processing systems: 2 x navigation radar GEM Elettronica SPN-753

The Ninfe class of survey vessels consists of two catamaran hulls operated by the Marina Militare Italiana.

== Features ==
They was designed to carry out hydro-oceanographic surveys at high sea and in harbours and shallow waters, in order to guarantee the production and updating of nautical charts.
Main activities:

- sounding
- minimum depth
- topography of shorelines and port facilities
- seabed features
- collection of nautical and geographical data for the updating of nautical documentation
- detection of sunken vessels or dangerous underwater obstacles

The collected data are then processed by means of dedicated software programs and then used to produce:

- paper and electronic nautical charts for the safety of navigation
- Additional Military Layers
- nautical, scientific and technical documentation for mariners
- oceanographic databases for scientific purposes

== Characteristics ==
It is fitted with:

- multi-beam echo sounder Simrad EM300 (30 kHz)
- single-beam echo sounder Simrad EA500 (12, 120 e 200 kHz)
- single-beam echo sounder Atlas Deso 25 (33, 100 e 210 kHz)
- Side Scan Sonar towed Simrad MS992
- differential and RTK satellite positioning systems
- Sippican XBT MK21 bathythermograph system
- CTD profiler with rosette system Ocean Seven 316 used for water sampling at different depths
- Van Veen buckets
- Sindel weather station

The ship is equipped one survey motor-boat for coastal and shallow water surveys fitted with:

- single beam Simrad EA400 (38 e 200 kHz)
- multi-beam echo sounders Simrad EM3000 (300 kHz)

== Ships ==
Italian Navy - Ninfe class
| Name | Pennant number | Laid down | Launched | Commissioned | Motto |
|---|---|---|---|---|---|
| Aretusa | A 5304 | | 9 May 2000 | 10 January 2002 | Arethusa undis prospicit |
| Galatea | A 5308 | | 7 June 2000 | 10 January 2002 | Felix Galatea vivas |
