= Italian ship Ammiraglio Magnaghi =

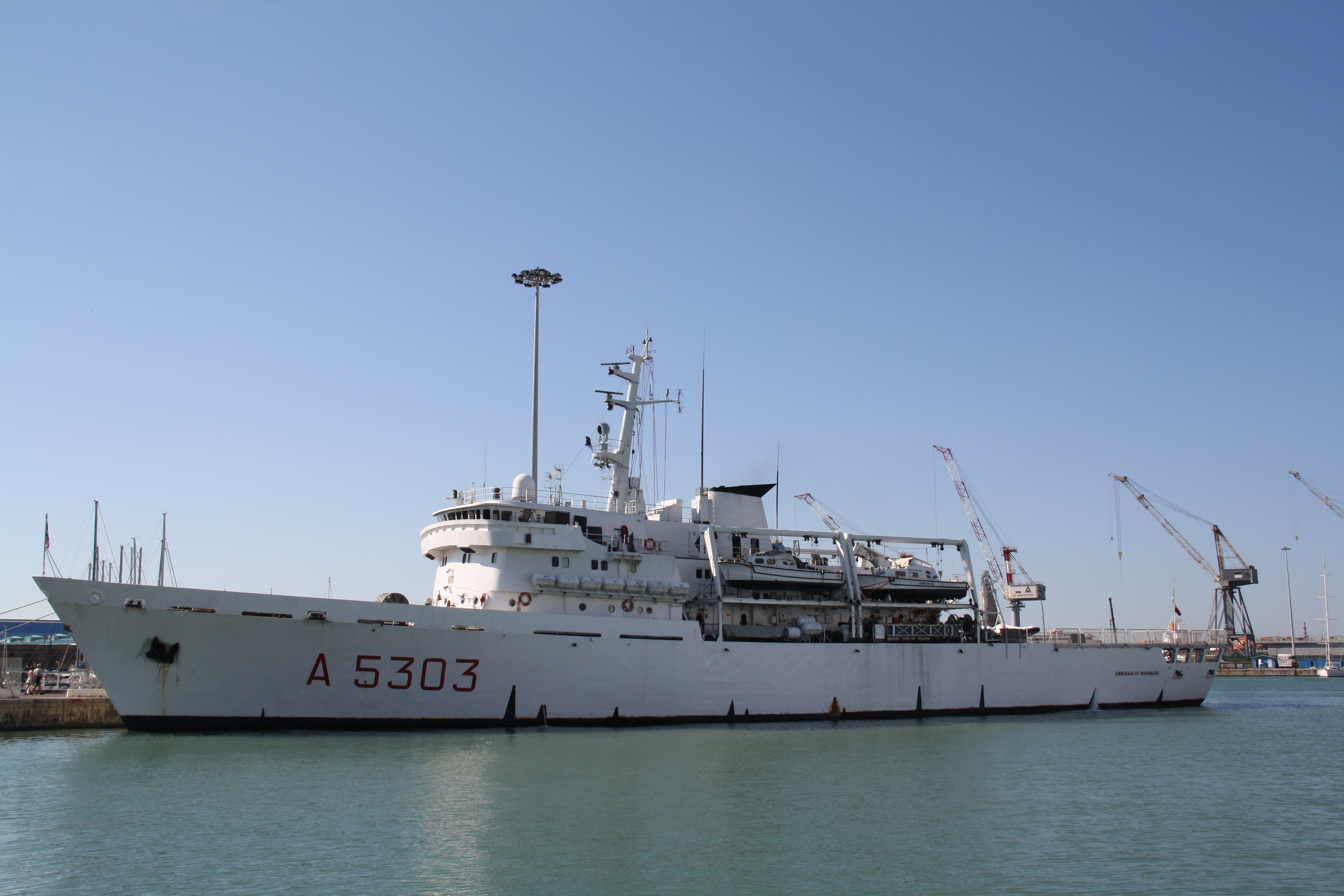
- Ammiraglio Magnaghi (A 5303) to Port of Livorno in 2013

History

Italy
- Name: Ammiraglio Magnaghi
- Namesake: Admiral Giovan Battista Magnaghi
- Builder: Cantieri Navali del Tirreno e Riuniti - Riva Trigoso (La Spezia)
- Laid down: 1973
- Launched: 8 October 1974
- Commissioned: 2 May 1975
- Home port: La Spezia
- Identification: Pennant number: A 5303; Hull number: 297; IMO number: 8642751
- Motto: Nauta pro nautis
- Status: in active service

General characteristics
- Type: hydrographic survey vessel
- Displacement: 1.744 t (1.716 long tons) full load
- Length: 82.7 m (271 ft) LOA
- Beam: 13.7 m (45 ft)
- Draught: 3.1 m (10 ft)
- Depth: 3.6 m (12 ft)
- Propulsion: - 2 × diesel engines Grandi Motori Trieste GMT B-306.SS, 2.206 kW (2.958 bhp); - 1 x electric engine AI-43/25-686 DP 176 kW (236 bhp); - 4 x diesel engines generators Grandi Motori Trieste GMT A-234-ESS; - 1 x single controllable pitch propeller; - 1 x bow thrust
- Speed: 14 kn (26 km/h; 16 mph) (4 kn (7.4 km/h; 4.6 mph) on electric engine)
- Range: 4,500 nmi (8,300 km; 5,200 mi) at 14 kn (26 km/h; 16 mph)
- Complement: 145, of which: 16 officials; 114 sailors; 15 scientists
- Sensors & processing systems: 2 x navigation radars GEM Elettronica
- Armament: 4 x Browning M2HB 12,7 mm
- Notes: - flight deck for SH90 class helicopters; - 3 x 8,6 m hydrographic boats; - 1 x RHIB

Ammiraglio Magnaghi (A 5303) is a hydrographic survey vessel in service with Italian Navy. It is the first survey vessel ever to be designed and built completely in Italy for the Marina Militare. It has been regularly modernized and constantly upgraded (with MLU works, in 1990 and 2014/2016 years).

== Characteristics ==
It is fitted with:

- single-beam echo sounder, 33 and 210 kHz
- single-beam echo sounder Kongsberg EA600 to 12, 38 and 200 kHz
- multi-beam echo sounder (50 kHz)
- side scan sonar hull-mounted (ELAC Seabeam 1050 MKII)
- side scan sonar towed (Klein 3900)
- differential and RTK satellite positioning systems
- geodimeter
- portable tide gauge
- XBT bathythermograph
- CTD profiler with rosette system used for water sampling at different depths
- one ROV with closed circuit TV system
- one core barrel
- current meters
- Van Veen buckets
- weather station
- suitable digital data logging and processing systems interfaced with oceanographic and hydrographic sensors.

The ship is equipped with:

- three survey motor boats (8,6 m length) for coastal and shallow water surveys fitted with single beam and multi-beam echo sounder Simrad EM-3002
- harbour survey motor launch
- two dinghies.

== History ==
Ammiraglio Magnaghi ship is named after Admiral Giovan Battista Magnaghi, first director of the Italian Hydrographic Institute.

The first Commander of Ammiraglio Magnaghi ship was Admiral Giuseppe Angrisano, who later became also Director of the Italian Hydrographic Institute and President of the International Hydrographic Organization.
