= List of Italian Coast Guard vessels =

The list of Italian Coast Guard vessels is a listing of all vessels to have been commissioned by the Corps of the Port Captaincies - Coast Guard during the history of that service.

== Assets in service ==
=== Offshore vessels ===
| Class | Picture | Shipyard Origin | Vessels | Pennant number | Commissioned | Displacement t | Note |
|---|---|---|---|---|---|---|---|
| Dattilo class | | Fincantieri Spa; Cantiere Navale di Castellammare di Stabia (Napoli) (Italy) | Luigi Dattilo | CP 940 | 2013 | 3.600 t | armed with 4 x MG 42/59 machine guns FFBNW x 1 OTO Melara; 76/62 mm Super Rapido |
| Dattilo class | | Fincantieri Spa; Cantiere Navale di Castellammare di Stabia (Napoli) (Italy) | Ubaldo Diciotti | CP 941 | 2014 | 3.600 t | armed with 4 x MG 42/59 machine guns FFBNW x 1 OTO Melara; 76/62 mm Super Rapido |
| | | Cantieri Navali Megaride; Napoli (Italy) | Bruno Gregoretti | CP 920 | 2014 | 2.153 t | armed with 2 x MG 42/59 machine guns |
| MPV850 class | | Fincantieri, Cantieri Navali Vittoria di Adria (Italy) | | | 2025 | 3.800 t | Under construction |
| MPV850 class | | Fincantieri, Cantieri Navali Vittoria di Adria (Italy) | Giuseppe Francese | | 2027 | 3.800 t | Under construction |

=== Outer Patrol boats ===
| Class | Picture | Shipyard Origin | Vessels | Pennant number | Commissioned | Displacement t | Note |
|---|---|---|---|---|---|---|---|
| Saettia; Mark 2 | | Fincantieri Spa; Cantiere Navale del Muggiano; La Spezia (Italy) | Fiorillo Michele | CP 904 | 2003 | 427 t | Armed with 1 x Oerlikon; 20/70 mm |
| Saettia; Mark 2 | | Fincantieri Spa; Cantiere Navale del Muggiano; La Spezia (Italy) | Peluso Alfredo | CP 905 | 2003 | 427 t | Armed with 1 x Oerlikon; 20/70 mm |
| Saettia; Mark 2 | | Fincantieri Spa; Cantiere Navale del Muggiano; La Spezia (Italy) | Corsi Oreste | CP 906 | 2004 | 427 t | Armed with 1 x Oerlikon; 20/70 mm |
| | | Intermarine di Messina (Italy) | Natale De Grazia | | 2020 | 150 t | |
| | | Intermarine di Messina (Italy) | Roberto Aringhieri | | 2021 | 150 t | |
| | | Intermarine di Messina (Italy) | Aurelio Visalli | | 2022 | 150 t | |
| | | Intermarine di Messina (Italy) | | | 2027 | | Under construction. option for 9 more twin units. |

=== Patrol boats ===
| Class | Picture | Shipyards Origin | Boats | Number | Commissioned | Displacement t | Note |
|---|---|---|---|---|---|---|---|
| Cavallari | | CRN Spa - Ancona (Italy) | Gaetano Magliano | 1 | | 156 t | updated by shipyards SIMAN Srl - La Spezia |
| Ingianni | | CRN Spa - Ancona (Italy) | Giulio Ingianni | 1 | 1992 | 245 t | updated by shipyards SIMAN Srl - La Spezia |
| 200/S | | "Cantieri Navali Rodriquez S.p.A." - Pietra Ligure and Messina (Italy) | | 24 | 2001 | 53 t | |

=== Motorboats ===
| Class | Picture | Shipyard Origin | Number | Displacement | Length | Max speed knots | Commissioned | Note |
Motorboats
| | | “Shipyard Family” (Italy) | 40 | ~30 t | 15 m | | 2026 | Under construction. |
| Class 300 Admiral Pollastrini | | Cantieri Navali Vittoria di Adria (Italy) | 5 | 34 t | 20.1 m | 35 | 2020 | |
| Class 300 FB Design | | Cantieri Navali FB Design (Italy) | 2 | 25 t | 17.1 m | 36 | 2024/2025 | 4 more optional |
| CP 600 | | (Italy) | 12 | 15,35 t | 11,43 m | 43 | 2006/2010 | |
| CP 825 | | (Italy) | 8 | 12 t | 12,73 m | 30 | 52 between 1999/2002 | |
| Classe 300 Ammiraglio Francese | | Codecasa Due Spa - Viareggio (Italy) | 22 | 30,5 t | 18,8 m | 30 | 18 between 8.2009/2014 | |
| CP 800 | | (Italy) | 86 | 9,1 t | 10,6 m | 30 | 13 between 1992/1996 | |
| CP 760 | | Arimar Spa - Montaletto di Cervia (Ravenna) (Italy) | 12 | | 12,18 m | | 5 in 2014 | |
| CP 713 | | (Italy) | 24 | 6,72 t | 10,2 m | 45 | 8 by Arimar between 2012/2013 | |
| CP 700 | | (Italy) | 10 | 6 t | 9,6 m | 30 | 12 | |
| CP 456 | | (Italy) | 3 | 19,4 t | 16,4 m | 26 | 1996/1999 | Ambulance ships |
| CP 262 | | (Italy) | 4 | 30 t | 16,4 m | 30 | 5 in 2000 | |
| CP 2301 | | (Italy) | 1 | | | | 2013 | |
| CP 2000 | | (Italy) (United Kingdom) | 38 | 11,7 t | 13,5 m | 23,4 | 2001/2008 | |
| CP 829; Giubileo | | (Italy) | CP 829-831; CP 836-838 | 12 t | 12,73 m | 30 | 6 in 2000 | |
| CP 512 | | Cantieri Navali del Golfo - Gaeta (Latina) (Italy) | 54 | 6,5 t | 9,73 m | 34 | | in retreat |

=== Survey vessels ===
| Class | Picture | Type | Boats | Displacement | Length | Max speed knots | Note |
Survey vessels
| CP 293 | | | CP 293 | 57 t | 21,1 m | 25 | Launched in 7.2009 for Regione Autonoma Sicilia as Galatea (PA 3932) by 1,5 million Euro Never used Vessel owned by ARPA Sicilia and operated by Italian Coast Guard, since 2013 |

=== Rigid-hulled inflatable boats ===
| Class | Picture | Type | Number | Displacement | Length | Max speed knots | Note |
Rigid-hulled inflatable boats (259 in Service)
| GC 166 | | | 63 | 2 t | 6.5 m | 35 | |
| GC B01 | | | 139 | 3 t | 7.3 m | 35 | |
| GC A01 | | | 57 | 4,091 t | 9,23 | 38 | |

=== Training vessels ===
| Class | Picture | Type | Boats | Displacement | Length | Max speed knots | Note |
Sailing ships
| Comet 85 | | ? | | | | | |

== List of Italian Coast Guard retired vessels (since 1950) ==
=== Patrol boats ===
| Class | Picture | Boats | Shipyard Origin | Displacement | Length | Max speed knots | Commissioned | Decommissioned | Note |
Patrol boats
| CP 902 Ubaldo Diciotti | | CP 902 Ubaldo Diciotti CP 903 Luigi Dattilo | Fincantieri - Cantiere Navale del Muggiano (La Spezia) (Italy) | 420 t | 52,8 m | 32 | 20.7.2002 28.11.2002 | 2012 2012 | Launched 8.4.2002 Delivered 24.4.2014 to Servicio Nacional Aeronaval de Panama (SENAN) as PO 901 Delivered 24.4.2014 to Servicio Nacional Aeronaval de Panama (SENAN) as PO 902 |
| CP 265 AGA (extended range) | | 4 units (CP 266, CP 270, CP 272, CP 275 ?) | "Cantieri Navali Rodriquez S.p.A." - Pietra Ligure and Messina (Italy) | 53 t | 25 m | 34 | 2001/2005 | 2011 | delivered on 7.5.2012 to Servizio Nacional Aeronaval de Panama (SENAN) as: PC 220 "Presidente Guillermo Endara"; PC 221 "Presidente Ernesto P. Balladares"; PC 222 "Presidente Mireya Moscoso"; PC 223 "Presidente Martín Torrijos" |
| CP 305 Audax | | CP 305 Audax | Cantiere Navale Felzegi SpA - Muggia (Trieste) (Italy) | 43,33 t | 19,62 m | 9,5 | 26.10.1954 | 1963 | Launched 2.3.1954 as Tug for "Amministrazione marittima del Territorio Libero di Trieste" |

=== Rescue patrol boats ===
| Class | Picture | Boats | Shipyard Origin | Displacement | Length | Max speed knots | Commissioned | Decommissioned | Note |
Rescue Patrol Boats
| CP 307 Michele Fiorillo | | CP 307 Michele Fiorillo | Fr. Schweers GmbH & Co. KG, Schiffs- und Bootswerft - Bardenflete (D) (Germany) | 85 t | 26,66 m | 24 | 1968 | 1.4.2001 | Launched in 1967 |
| CP 312 Bruno Gregoretti | | CP 312 Bruno Gregoretti | Fr. Schweers GmbH & Co. KG, Schiffs- und Bootswerft - Bardenflete (D) (Germany) | 65 t | 23,2 m | 20 | 2.7.1975 | 12.2007 | Launched in 1973; Preserved to Leghorn Harbor |
| CP 314 | | CP 314 CP 315 CP 316 CP 317 | Cantieri Baglietto - Varazze (Savona) (Italy) | 43,1 t | 18,05 m | 20 | 1988 / / 1991 | 1.10.2011 / / / | CP 314 launched 20.2.1988 |
| CP 318 | | CP 318 | Cantieri Navali Rodriguez Spa - Messina (Italy) | 43,1 t | 18,05 m | 20 | 5.1991 | | |
| CP 301 Barnett | | CP 301 CP 302 CP 306 CP 308 CP 309 CP 310 CP 311 | "Groves and Guttridge" Cowes, Hampshire (United Kingdom) | 29 t | 16,6 m | 10 | 1964 | | |
| CP 303 USCG 44 feet | | CP 303 CP 304 | USCG Yard - Curtis Bay, Maryland (United States) | 17,7 t | 13,45 m | 14 | 1965 1965 | 30.9.2001 1.4.2001 | Launched as USCG 44337; Delivered 18.6.2002 to Albania Navy as RB 122 (R 122) Launched as USCG 44338; Preserved to Ravenna Italian Coast Guard base |

=== Motorboats ===
| Class | Picture | Boats | Shipyard Origin | Displacement | Length | Max speed knots | Commissioned | Decommissioned | Note |
Motorboats
| CP 115 | | CP 115 | Cantieri Navali Vio Ing. Ruggero - Venezia (Italy) | | 9 m | 25 | 1969 | | |
| CP 117 | | CP 117; CP 118; CP 119 | (Italy) | | 7,17 m | 20 | 1974 | | |
| CP 121 | | CP 121 | Cantiere Oscar di Costantino & C." - Venezia (Italy) | | 9,2 m | 21 | 1985 | | |
| CP 123 | | CP 123 | "Cantiere Pietro Cucchini" - Venezia (Italy) | | 9,15 m | 25 | 1992 | | |
| CP 151 | | CP 151; CP 152; CP 153; CP 154; CP 155; CP 156; CP 157; CP 158 | "Motomar Cantiere del Mediterraneo S.p.a." - Palermo (Italy) | | 9,15 m | 25 | 1992 | | |
| CP 457 | | CP 457 | (Italy) | | | | 16.12.2002 | 31.10.2005 | |

=== Coastal patrol boats ===
| Class | Picture | Boats | Shipyard Origin | Displacement | Length | Max speed knots | Commissioned | Decommissioned | Note |
Coastal Patrol Boats
| CP 201 | | CP 201 | (United Kingdom) | | | | | | ex UK Torpedo vessel |
| CP 202 Caterina | | CP 202 CP 203 CP 204 CP 205 CP 206 CP 207 CP 208 CP 209 CP 210 CP 211 CP 212 CP 213 CP 214 CP 215 CP 216 CP 217 CP 218 CP 219 CP 220 CP 221 CP 222 CP 223 CP 224 CP 225 | (Italy) | | | | 1956/1961 | | CP 224 in 2008 delivered to Albania Navy |
| CP 501 | | CP 501 | (Italy) | | | | | 31.3.2001 | |
| CP 502 | | CP 502 CP 503 | (Italy) | | | | | 31.12.2001 | |
| CP 504 | | CP 504 CP 505 | Cantiere Crestiatlia - Amelia (Italy) | | | | 1981 1981 | 31.12.2002 31.12.2002 | |
| CP 506 | | CP 506 CP 507 CP 508 CP 509 CP 510 CP 511 | "Cantieri Navali del Golfo" - Gaeta (Latina) (Italy) | 6,5 t | 9,73 m | 34 | 1990 1990 1990 1990 1990 1990 | / 17.1.2011 31.12.2005 / / / | |
| CP 601 Seppietta | | CP 601 CP 602 CP 603 CP 604 CP 605 | Cantiere Crestitalia - Amelia (Italy) | 3,5 t | 8,5 m | 16 | 1988 | 31.12.2001 31.12.2001 2001 / / | |
| CP 1001 | | CP 1001 CP 1002 CP 1003 CP 1004 CP 1005 CP 1006 | Cantiere Crestitalia - Amelia (Italy) | 3,5 t | 8,5 m | 16 | 15.3.1974 / 21.11.1974 / / / | 31.12.2001 31.12.2001 31.12.2001 31.12.2001 31.12.2001 31.12.2001 | CP 1001 delivered 2003 to Istituto Tecnico Navale "Nazrio Sauro" - La Spezia as Ernesto Parola CP 1003 delivered in 2004 to Istituto Professionale "Giovanni da Verrazzano" di Porto Santo Stefano |
| CP 2001 | | CP 2001 CP 2002 CP 2003 CP 2004 CP 2005 | "Vosper Thornicroft Group Ltd." - Portsmouth (UK) (United Kingdom) | 8,91 t | 12,31 m | 24 | 1971 1971 1971 1971 1971 | 31.3.2005 31.12.2003 31.12.2001 31.12.2001 31.12.2001 | CP 2003 delivered 2005 to Istituto Tecnico Navale "Alfredo Cappellini" - Livorno |
| CP 2006 | | CP 2006 CP 2007 CP 2008 CP 2009 | "Cantieri Bianchi e Cecchi" - Cogoleto (Italy) | 11 t | 12,54 m | 24 | 1973 / / 1974 | 31.12.2002 30.7.2004 29.6.2004 31.12.2001 | CP 2007 delivered in 2004 to Albania Navy as RB 227 (R 227); CP 2008 delivered in 2004 to Albania Navy as RB 125 (R 125) |
| CP 2010 | | CP 2010 CP 2012 CP 2013 CP 2014 CP 2015 CP 2016 CP 2017 | "Cantiere Motomar Spa" - Lavagna (Italy) | 11 t | 12,54 m | 20 | 1973 / 31.12.1973 / / / 1975 | 31.12.2001 10.2.2004 2005 31.12.2003 31.12.2001 1997 31.12.2003 | CP 2010 delivered 18.6.2002 to Albania Navy as RB 224 (R 224); CP 2014 delivered to Istituto Tecnico Navale "Gioeni Trabia" - Palermo |
| CP 2018 | | CP 2018 CP 2019 CP 2020 CP 2021 CP 2022 CP 2023 | "Cantieri Bianchi e Cecchi" - Cogoleto (Italy) | 10 t | 12,54 m | 21 | 1974 / / / / 1975 | 31.12.2001 31.12.2005 29.6.2004 29.6.2004 31.3.2001 30.7.2004 | CP 2020 delivered 2004 to Albania Navy as RB 126 (R 126); CP 2021 delivered 2004 to Albania Navy as RB 127 (R 127); CP 2023 delivered 2004 to Albania Navy as RB 228 (R 228) |
| CP 2024 | | CP 2024 | "Cantieri Nautico Navaltecnica di Tricomi Giovanni" - Messina (Italy) | 15 t | 13,7 m | 24 | 1973 | 31.12.2005 | |
| CP 2025 | | CP 2025 CP 2026 CP 2027 CP 2028 CP 2029 CP 2030 CP 2031 | "Keith Nelson Italia S.p.A." - Viareggio (Italy) | 10 t | 12,54 m | 22 | 1975 / / / / / 1976 | 21.7.2002 31.12.2003 31.12.2003 31.12.2003 31.12.2003 31.12.2003 31.12.2003 | CP 2026 delivered 31.3.2007 to Civil Protection "Volontari del Garda" organization, as Volga 2026 |
| CP 2032 | | CP 2032 CP 2033 CP 2034 CP 2035 | "Cantiere Motomar S.p.A." - Lavagna (Italy) | 12 t | 12,54 m | 22 | 1975 / / 1976 | 31.12.2003 31.12.2003 30.7.2004 30.4.2006 | CP 2034 delivered 2004 to Albania Navy as RB 128 (R 128) CP 2035 renamed GC L11 |
| CP 2036 | | CP 2036 CP 2037 CP 2038 CP 2039 CP 2040 CP 2041 CP 2042 CP 2043 CP 2044 CP 2045 | "Keith Nelson Italia S.p.A." - Viareggio (Italy) | 11 t | 12,54 m | 22 | 1976 / / 1977 / / / 1978 / 1978 | 8.5.2006 10.5.2006 31.12.2006 2009 2009 31.12.2006 28.2.2006 2009 31.12.2006 31.12.2006 | CP 2034 delivered 2010 to Iraqi Navy as P 205 CP 2035 delivered 2010 to Iraqi Navy as P 206 |
| CP 2046 | | CP 2046 CP 2048 CP 2049 | "Motomar Cantiere del Mediterraneo S.p.a." - Palermo (Italy) | 11,6 t | 12,54 m | 20 | 1978 1978 1978 | 1.1.2008 31.12.2006 31.12.2006 | |
| CP 2049 | | CP 2049 CP 2050 CP 2051 CP 2052 CP 2053 CP 2054 CP 2055 CP 2057 CP 2058 CP 2059 CP 2060 CP 2061 CP 2062 CP 2063 CP 2064 CP 2065 | "Cantieri Navali Balsamo" - Brindisi (Italy) | 12,47 t | 12,56 m | 23 | 1978 / / / 12.1978 / / / 1979 / / 1979 / 1979 / 1979 | 31.12.2005 31.12.2006 1.6.2007 31.7.2005 31.12.2009 31.12.2006 20.3.2003 31.12.2006 31.12.2006 / / 31.12.2006 2.7.2007 31.12.2006 1.3.2010 31.12.2006 | CP 2058 delivered 2007 to Istituto Tecnico Navale "Ugo Tiberio" - Termoli as TM 082-D |
| CP 2066 | | CP 2066 CP 2067 CP 2068 | "Cantieri Navali di La Spezia" (Italy) | 12,5 t | 12,56 m | 23 | 1979 1980 1980 | 31.12.2006 8.5.2006 | CP 2067 delivered 2010 to Iraqi Navy as P 203; CP 2068 delivered 2010 to Iraqi Navy as P 204 |

=== Fast patrol boats ===
| Class | Picture | Boats | Shipyard Origin | Displacement | Length | Max speed knots | Commissioned | Decommissioned | Note |
Fast Patrol Boats
| CP 226 | | CP 226 CP 227 | Navaltecnica Spa - Anzio (Roma) (Italy) | 15,14 t | 13,12 m | 20 | 1963 1963 | / 31.10.2003 | |
| CP 228 | | CP 228 CP 229 CP 230 | "Navaltecnica S.p.A." - Anzio (Roma) (Italy) | 12,1 t | 13,12 m | 25 | 1965 / 1966 | / 31.10.2001 31.10.2003 | CP 228 preserved to Monfalcone Harbor (Gorizia) CP 229 Delivered 18.6.2002 to Albania Navy as R 123 CP 230 delivered in 2004 to Djibouti Armed Forces |
| CP 231 | | CP 231 CP 232 CP 233 CP 234 CP 235 CP 236 CP 237 CP 238 | "Cantiere Navale Leopoldo Rodriquez" - Messina (Italy) | 14,01 t | 13,4 m | 26,6 | 1968 1968 1968 1968 1968 1969 1969 1970 | 31.12.2001 / 31.12.2003 2002 31.5.2001 31.12.2001 26.4.2004 31.12.2005 | CP 233 sold as yacht TP Tagari CP 234 delivered to Albania Navy as R 225 CP 235 delivered 18.6.2002 to Albania Navy as R 124 CP 236 delivered 18.6.2002 to Albania Navy as R 226 |
| CP 239 | | CP 239 CP 240 CP 241 CP 242 CP 243 | "Cantiere Navale Leopoldo Rodriquez" - Messina (Italy) | 23,5 t | 16,8 m | 28,6 | 1973 1974 1974 1974 1974 | 2004 1991 2002 31.12.2002 1.5.2004 | CP 242 delivered in 2004 to Djibouti Armed Forces |
| CP 244 | | CP 244 | "Cantiere Navale Leopoldo Rodriquez" - Messina (Italy) | | 13,4 m | | 1976 | 31.12.2003 | |
| CP 245 | | CP 245 | "Cantiere Navale Leopoldo Rodriquez" - Messina (Italy) | | 16,8 m | | 1976 | 31.3.2005 | |
| CP 246 | | CP 246 | "Cantiere Navale Leopoldo Rodriquez" - Messina (Italy) | | 10,0 m | | 1977 | 31.5.2005 | |
| CP 247 | | CP 247 CP 248 CP 249 CP 250 CP 251 CP 252 CP 253 | "Cooperativa Costruzioni Navali" - Ostia (Roma) (Italy) | | 10,0 m | | 1980 12.1980 1981 / / 10.1981 / | 8.5.2006 28.2.2006 21.4.2008 5.5.2006 1.12.2006 31.3.2006 31.7.2005 | Delivered in 2010 to Iraqi Navy as P 201 / Delivered 18.6.2008 to Albania Navy as R ... Delivered in 2010 to Iraqi Navy as P 202 / / Sold as yacht "Araba Fenice" |
| CP 254 | | CP 254 CP 255 CP 259 CP 260 | "Tecnomarine Picchiotti" - Viareggio (Italy) | 22,5 t | 15,1 m | 31 | 1984 / / 1989 | 31.12.2010 31.5.2006 3.2014 12.12.2010 | |
| CP 256 | | CP 256 CP 257 CP 258 | Italcraft - Gaeta (Latina) (Italy) | 23,7 t | 16,0 m | 33 | 1985 | | |

=== Coastal boats ===
| Class | Picture | Boats | Shipyard Origin | Displacement | Length | Max speed knots | Commissioned | Decommissioned | Note |
Coastal Boats
| CP 5001 | | CP 5001 CP 5002 CP 5003 CP 5004 CP 5005 CP 5006 CP 5007 CP 5008 CP 5009 CP 5010 CP 5011 CP 5012 | "Vasnautica" - Milano (Italy) | | 5,3 m | 24 | 1969 1969 / / / / / / / / / 1971 | | |
| CP 5013 | | CP 5013 - CP 5033; CP 5038 - CP 5043; CP 5051 - CP 5055 | "Marine Union" - Milano (Italy) | | 6,5 m | 30 | 1973 | | |
| CP 5034 | | CP 5034; CP 5035; CP 5036; CP 5037; CP 5044; CP 5045; CP 5046; CP 5047; CP 5048 cp 5049; CP 5050; CP 5056; CP 5057; CP 5058 | "Motomar - Milano (Italy) | | 5,2 m | 22 | 1973 | | |
| CP 5059 | | CP 5059; CP 5060; CP 5061; CP 5062; CP 5063; CP 5064 | "Motomar - Milano (Italy) | | 5,2 m | 22 | 1973 | | |
| CP 6001 | | CP 6001; CP 6002; CP 6003; CP 6004; CP 6005; CP 6006; CP 6007; CP 6008; CP 6009; CP 6010; CP 6011; CP 6012; CP 6013; CP 6014; CP 6015; CP 6016; CP 6017; CP 6018; CP 6019; CP 6020; CP 6021; CP 6022 | "Azimut - Benetti Spa" - Viareggio (Italy) | 3,73 t | 8,0 m | 24 | 1986 / / / / / / / / / / / 14.11.1988; 14.11.1988; 1988; 1988; 1988; 1988; 1988; 1988; 1988; 1988 | / 31.12.2005; 31.12.2001; 31.12.2001; 31.12.2001; 31.12.2005; 31.12.2002; 31.12.2001; 31.12.2001; 31.12.2002; 31.12.2003; 31.12.2001; 31.5.2005; 31.7.2005 / 31.12.2005; 20.3.2003; 31.7.2005 / 31.5.2005; 31.12.2005; 31.8.2003 | |

=== Anti pollution vessels ===
| Class | Picture | Boats | Shipyard Origin | Displacement | Length | Max speed knots | Commissioned | Decommissioned | Note |
Anti pollution vessels (Battello Semovente Antinquinamento)
| CP 01 | | CP 01 CP 02 CP 03 CP 04 CP 05 CP 06 CP 07 CP 08 CP 09 CP 10 CP 11 CP 12 CP 13 CP 14 CP 15 | (Italy) | | | | | / / 1995 / / / 14.7.2001 24.7.2001 2009 / / / 1998 / / | |
| CP 16; Gabbiano Altomare C21 | | CP 16 (for sale on 7.9.2014) CP 17 CP 18 CP 19 | I. M. S. Industrie Meccaniche Ing. A. Scardellato - Casale sul Sile (TV) (Italy) | 19 t | 12 m | | 1979 | 31.5.2001 | |
Support vessels
| CP 122 | | CP 122 | Cantiere Navale De Poli - Venezia (Italy) | | 21,52 m | 25 | 1991 | | ferry-boat |
Survey vessels
| USS Bannock | | CP 451 Bannock | (United States) | 1,646 t | 62,56 m | 16 | 1.5.1979 | 2001 | Launched 7.1.1943 as USS Bannock (AT-81/ATF-81) |
| | | CP 452 Barbara | Cantiere Navalmeccanico di Senigallia (Italy) | 195 t | 30,5 m | 12 | 1998 | 2007 | Launched in 1970; Commissioned in 1975 for Italian Navy as Experimental Vessel A 5315 Barbara; Used in Salto di Quirra polygon as launch and recovery vessel for RPV Meteor CT 20 type XXI; Since 1985 converted to coastal patrol boat P492 Barbara; Since 1998 commissioned to Italian Coast Guard; Since 2007 sold to "Interpromos Srl"; Since 2008 converted to yacht Barbara |
| | | CP 453 | (Italy) | | | | | | Survey motorboat |
