= Future of the Italian Navy =

The Italian Navy is modernising, and a certain number of ships are on order, in development, or planned to be purchased. This page summarises the future of the Navy.

== Planned retirements ==
=== Bergamini class ===
The Italian Navy will sell two Bergamini class frigates, the Carlo Bergamini (GP standard) and the Virginio Fasan (IT‑ASW standard) to the Hellenic Nav, the deal was signed in September 2026.

== Fleet on order ==
The Italian navy is expanding its fleet by bringing back to line some new patrol ships for the ones that were not replaced, and will replace each other ships that need to be replaced.

=== Submarine fleet ===
Class	Ordered	Picture	Type	Ship	No.	Planned comm.	Disp.	Notes
Attack submarines (4)
U212 NFS class	4		Diesel-electric / AIP, attack submarines	Goffredo Mameli	NFS1	2027	1,830 tonnes	Successor of the Sauro class.: 2 ordered in February 2021; 1 ordered in July 2023; 1 ordered in June 2024
U212 NFS class	4		Diesel-electric / AIP, attack submarines	Pietro Calvi	NFS2	2029	1,830 tonnes	Successor of the Sauro class.: 2 ordered in February 2021; 1 ordered in July 2023; 1 ordered in June 2024
U212 NFS class	4		Diesel-electric / AIP, attack submarines	Enrico Tazzoli	NFS3	2030	1,830 tonnes	Successor of the Sauro class.: 2 ordered in February 2021; 1 ordered in July 2023; 1 ordered in June 2024
U212 NFS class	4		Diesel-electric / AIP, attack submarines	Enrico Toti	NFS4	2032	1,830 tonnes	Successor of the Sauro class.: 2 ordered in February 2021; 1 ordered in July 2023; 1 ordered in June 2024

=== Surface warships fleet ===
Class	Ordered	Picture	Type	Ship	No.	Planned comm.	Disp.	Notes
Destroyers (2)
DDX class	2	–	Guided Missile Destroyer (Air defence and land strike missions)	–	–	2033	14,500 tonnes	Contract for the successor of the Durand de la Penne class signed in September 2026. The contract with OSN (JV between Fincantieri and Leonardo) is worth €3.7 billion.
DDX class	2	–	Guided Missile Destroyer (Air defence and land strike missions)	–	–	2035	14,500 tonnes	Contract for the successor of the Durand de la Penne class signed in September 2026. The contract with OSN (JV between Fincantieri and Leonardo) is worth €3.7 billion.
Frigates (4)
FREMM EVO class	2		ASW frigate	Bersagliere	–	2029	6,700 tonnes	Ordered in July 2024 to replace the Maestrale class.
FREMM EVO class	2		ASW frigate	Aviere	–	2030	6,700 tonnes	Ordered in July 2024 to replace the Maestrale class.
Thaon di Revel class PPA Full	2		frigate	Marcantonio Colonna	P 433	2029	6,270 tonnes	
Thaon di Revel class PPA Full	2		frigate	Ruggiero di Lauria	P 435	2030	6,270 tonnes	
Patrol ships (4)
PPX class	4 (+ 2 option)		OPV	Ugolino Vivaldi	P 440	2027	2,450 tonnes	Contract with OSN in 2023. for 3 PPX which will replace the Cassiopea class (4 ships) and the Sirio class (2 ships). Contract in 2024 for 1 additional PPX. The ship is based on the Fincantieri FCx20 design.
PPX class	4 (+ 2 option)		OPV	Sebastiano Caboto	P 441	2028	2,450 tonnes	Contract with OSN in 2023. for 3 PPX which will replace the Cassiopea class (4 ships) and the Sirio class (2 ships). Contract in 2024 for 1 additional PPX. The ship is based on the Fincantieri FCx20 design.
PPX class	4 (+ 2 option)		OPV	Antonio da Noli	P 442	–	2,450 tonnes	Contract with OSN in 2023. for 3 PPX which will replace the Cassiopea class (4 ships) and the Sirio class (2 ships). Contract in 2024 for 1 additional PPX. The ship is based on the Fincantieri FCx20 design.
PPX class	4 (+ 2 option)		OPV	Giovanni da Verrazzano	P 443	–	2,450 tonnes	Contract with OSN in 2023. for 3 PPX which will replace the Cassiopea class (4 ships) and the Sirio class (2 ships). Contract in 2024 for 1 additional PPX. The ship is based on the Fincantieri FCx20 design.
Minehunters (5)
CNG-C	5 (+3 option)	–	Coastal mine countermeasure vessels	–	–	2028	1,300 tonnes	Successor to the Lerici class and the Gaeta class. Contract for development to Intermarine signed in 2021, financing for production approved in 2022. Production contract in July 2024.
CNG-C	5 (+3 option)	–	Coastal mine countermeasure vessels	–	–	–	1,300 tonnes	Successor to the Lerici class and the Gaeta class. Contract for development to Intermarine signed in 2021, financing for production approved in 2022. Production contract in July 2024.
CNG-C	5 (+3 option)	–	Coastal mine countermeasure vessels	–	–	–	1,300 tonnes	Successor to the Lerici class and the Gaeta class. Contract for development to Intermarine signed in 2021, financing for production approved in 2022. Production contract in July 2024.
CNG-C	5 (+3 option)	–	Coastal mine countermeasure vessels	–	–	–	1,300 tonnes	Successor to the Lerici class and the Gaeta class. Contract for development to Intermarine signed in 2021, financing for production approved in 2022. Production contract in July 2024.
CNG-C	5 (+3 option)	–	Coastal mine countermeasure vessels	–	–	–	1,300 tonnes	Successor to the Lerici class and the Gaeta class. Contract for development to Intermarine signed in 2021, financing for production approved in 2022. Production contract in July 2024.

=== Support and auxiliary ships ===
Class	Ordered	Picture	Type	Ship	No.	Planned comm.	Disp.	Notes
Coastal logistic support (2)
MTC-F class	2 (+8 option)	_	Auxiliary coastal transport and lighthouse assistance units	_	_	_	1,500 tonnes	Successor of the Gorgona class (coastal logistical support ship) and the Ponza class (lighthouse and maritime signaling service ship). 10 planned in total with financing approved, 2 ordered in December 2023 to T.Mariotti.
MTC-F class	2 (+8 option)	_	Auxiliary coastal transport and lighthouse assistance units	_	_	_	1,500 tonnes	Successor of the Gorgona class (coastal logistical support ship) and the Ponza class (lighthouse and maritime signaling service ship). 10 planned in total with financing approved, 2 ordered in December 2023 to T.Mariotti.
Underwater support vessels (1)
SDO-SuRS class	1	_	Submarine rescue ship	Olterra	A5321	2027	12,000 tonnes	Laid down in April 2023 and transferred to Genoa in 2024 for final fitting out, the ship is now undergoing integration and testing, with delivery scheduled for 2027. The DRASS 100 is part of the equipment of the SDO SuRS, it's a saturation diving system for submarine rescue.
Hydrographic survey (2)
NIOM class	1		Hydrographic survey vessel	Quirinale	A5305	2027	6,400 tonnes	Successor of the Ammiraglio Magnaghi. Vessel to be operated by the Italian Navy Hydrographic Institute.
NOMR class	1	_	Hydrographic survey vessel	Arcadia	_	2027	4,250 tonnes	A civilian vessel employed by (ISPRA), in national interests in cooperation with the navy.
Tugboats (8)
La Spezia shipyard S.I.M.A.N	4	–	Harbour tugboats	–	–	–	90 - 200 tonnes (full load draft)	Contract in 2022 for €8.39 million (first batch)
La Spezia shipyard S.I.M.A.N	4	–	Harbour tugboats	–	–	–	90 - 200 tonnes (full load draft)	Contract in 2022 for €8.39 million (first batch)
La Spezia shipyard S.I.M.A.N	4	–	Harbour tugboats	–	–	–	90 - 200 tonnes (full load draft)	Contract in 2022 for €8.39 million (first batch)
La Spezia shipyard S.I.M.A.N	4	–	Harbour tugboats	–	–	–	90 - 200 tonnes (full load draft)	Contract in 2022 for €8.39 million (first batch)
La Spezia shipyard S.I.M.A.N	4 (+2 option)	–	Seagoing tugboats	–	–	–	500 tonnes (full load draft)	Contract in 2024 for €37.6 million
La Spezia shipyard S.I.M.A.N	4 (+2 option)	–	Seagoing tugboats	–	–	–	500 tonnes (full load draft)	Contract in 2024 for €37.6 million
La Spezia shipyard S.I.M.A.N	4 (+2 option)	–	Seagoing tugboats	–	–	–	500 tonnes (full load draft)	Contract in 2024 for €37.6 million
La Spezia shipyard S.I.M.A.N	4 (+2 option)	–	Seagoing tugboats	–	–	–	500 tonnes (full load draft)	Contract in 2024 for €37.6 million
Training vessel (4)
TIRMA class	4	–	Maneouver training vessel	–	–	–	170 tonnes	Contract in March 2024 for a ship for the Naval Academy to be built by Baglietto Navy e Siman Yachts. Successor of the Aragosta class.
TIRMA class	4	–	Maneouver training vessel	–	–	–	170 tonnes	Contract in March 2024 for a ship for the Naval Academy to be built by Baglietto Navy e Siman Yachts. Successor of the Aragosta class.
TIRMA class	4	–	Maneouver training vessel	–	–	–	170 tonnes	Contract in March 2024 for a ship for the Naval Academy to be built by Baglietto Navy e Siman Yachts. Successor of the Aragosta class.
TIRMA class	4	–	Maneouver training vessel	–	–	–	170 tonnes	Contract in March 2024 for a ship for the Naval Academy to be built by Baglietto Navy e Siman Yachts. Successor of the Aragosta class.

Note: the adjudication to Cimolai for 5 azimuth thruster tugboat for €30.55 million was cancelled and re-assigned to SIMAN for 4 (+ 2 on option) Seagoing tugboat

== Investments financed by the parliament ==
Ships planned considered in the 2023-2025 investment plan.

This list only includes the future investments that were approved by the parliament, but that haven't yet been contracted.

=== Submarines ===
Class	Financed by parliament (not ordered yet)	Picture	Type	Planned comm.	Disp.	Notes
Attack submarines (2)
U212 NFS EVO class	2		Diesel-electric / AIP, attack submarines	–	> 2,000 tonnes	Unveiled at CNE 2024, intended for 2036 in the Italian Navy.
U212 NFS EVO class	2		Diesel-electric / AIP, attack submarines	–	> 2,000 tonnes	Unveiled at CNE 2024, intended for 2036 in the Italian Navy.
Unmanned submarines (3)
BlueWhale (ELI-3325)	3		Long range autonomous unmanned submarine (ISR and [[Anti-submarine warfare|ASW]] missions)	–	–	MoD request to parliament for the purchase of a submarine from ELTA Systems (2024). Investment mentioned in the Documento Programmatico Pluriennale 2023-2025.
BlueWhale (ELI-3325)	3		Long range autonomous unmanned submarine (ISR and [[Anti-submarine warfare|ASW]] missions)	–	–	MoD request to parliament for the purchase of a submarine from ELTA Systems (2024). Investment mentioned in the Documento Programmatico Pluriennale 2023-2025.
BlueWhale (ELI-3325)	3		Long range autonomous unmanned submarine (ISR and [[Anti-submarine warfare|ASW]] missions)	–	–	MoD request to parliament for the purchase of a submarine from ELTA Systems (2024). Investment mentioned in the Documento Programmatico Pluriennale 2023-2025.

=== Surface warships fleet ===
Class	Financed by parliament (not ordered yet)	Picture	Type	Planned comm.	Disp.	Notes
Patrol ships (2)
PPX class	2		OPV	–	2,450 tonnes	Contract with OSN in 2023. for 3 PPX and 3 in option which will replace the Cassiopea class (4 ships) and the Sirio class (2 ships). 1 additional ship in option ordered in 2024. 2 remain in option. The ship is based on the Fincantieri FCx20 design.
PPX class	2		OPV	–	2,450 tonnes	Contract with OSN in 2023. for 3 PPX and 3 in option which will replace the Cassiopea class (4 ships) and the Sirio class (2 ships). 1 additional ship in option ordered in 2024. 2 remain in option. The ship is based on the Fincantieri FCx20 design.
Minehunters (7)
CNG-A class	4	–	Expeditionary mine countermeasure vessels	–	2,100 tonnes	Successor to the Lerici class and the Gaeta class. Contract for development to Intermarine signed in 2021, financing for production approved in 2022. Production contract for 5 CNG-C ships in July 2024, 8 planned in total.
CNG-A class	4	–	Expeditionary mine countermeasure vessels	–	2,100 tonnes	Successor to the Lerici class and the Gaeta class. Contract for development to Intermarine signed in 2021, financing for production approved in 2022. Production contract for 5 CNG-C ships in July 2024, 8 planned in total.
CNG-A class	4	–	Expeditionary mine countermeasure vessels	–	2,100 tonnes	Successor to the Lerici class and the Gaeta class. Contract for development to Intermarine signed in 2021, financing for production approved in 2022. Production contract for 5 CNG-C ships in July 2024, 8 planned in total.
CNG-A class	4	–	Expeditionary mine countermeasure vessels	–	2,100 tonnes	Successor to the Lerici class and the Gaeta class. Contract for development to Intermarine signed in 2021, financing for production approved in 2022. Production contract for 5 CNG-C ships in July 2024, 8 planned in total.
CNG-C class	3	–	Coastal mine countermeasure vessels	–	1,300 tonnes	Successor to the Lerici class and the Gaeta class. Contract for development to Intermarine signed in 2021, financing for production approved in 2022. Production contract for 5 CNG-C ships in July 2024, 8 planned in total.
CNG-C class	3	–	Coastal mine countermeasure vessels	–	1,300 tonnes	Successor to the Lerici class and the Gaeta class. Contract for development to Intermarine signed in 2021, financing for production approved in 2022. Production contract for 5 CNG-C ships in July 2024, 8 planned in total.
CNG-C class	3	–	Coastal mine countermeasure vessels	–	1,300 tonnes	Successor to the Lerici class and the Gaeta class. Contract for development to Intermarine signed in 2021, financing for production approved in 2022. Production contract for 5 CNG-C ships in July 2024, 8 planned in total.
Signal intelligence (2)
J3MS class	2	–	ELINT / SIGINT	–	–	As stated in the Decree, this is the first part of the program, which covers the construction and commissioning of the first unit and its ten-year logistical support, for a total value of 770 million euros.
J3MS class	2	–	ELINT / SIGINT	–	–	As stated in the Decree, this is the first part of the program, which covers the construction and commissioning of the first unit and its ten-year logistical support, for a total value of 770 million euros.

=== Support and auxiliary ships ===
Class	Financed by parliament (not ordered yet)	Picture	Type	Planned comm.	Disp.	Notes
Logistic support (1)
Vulcano class	1 (+1 planned)		Logistic support ship	2031	27,200 tonnes	2 are already ordered, 3 are financed. A total of 4 ships is planned.
Coastal logistic support (8)
MTC-F class	8	–	Auxiliary coastal transport and lighthouse assistance units	–	–	Successor of the Gorgona class (coastal logistical support ship) and the Ponza class (lighthouse and maritime signaling service ship). 10 planned in total with financing approved, 2 ordered in December 2023 to T.Mariotti.
MTC-F class	8	–	Auxiliary coastal transport and lighthouse assistance units	–	–	Successor of the Gorgona class (coastal logistical support ship) and the Ponza class (lighthouse and maritime signaling service ship). 10 planned in total with financing approved, 2 ordered in December 2023 to T.Mariotti.
MTC-F class	8	–	Auxiliary coastal transport and lighthouse assistance units	–	–	Successor of the Gorgona class (coastal logistical support ship) and the Ponza class (lighthouse and maritime signaling service ship). 10 planned in total with financing approved, 2 ordered in December 2023 to T.Mariotti.
MTC-F class	8	–	Auxiliary coastal transport and lighthouse assistance units	–	–	Successor of the Gorgona class (coastal logistical support ship) and the Ponza class (lighthouse and maritime signaling service ship). 10 planned in total with financing approved, 2 ordered in December 2023 to T.Mariotti.
MTC-F class	8	–	Auxiliary coastal transport and lighthouse assistance units	–	–	Successor of the Gorgona class (coastal logistical support ship) and the Ponza class (lighthouse and maritime signaling service ship). 10 planned in total with financing approved, 2 ordered in December 2023 to T.Mariotti.
MTC-F class	8	–	Auxiliary coastal transport and lighthouse assistance units	–	–	Successor of the Gorgona class (coastal logistical support ship) and the Ponza class (lighthouse and maritime signaling service ship). 10 planned in total with financing approved, 2 ordered in December 2023 to T.Mariotti.
MTC-F class	8	–	Auxiliary coastal transport and lighthouse assistance units	–	–	Successor of the Gorgona class (coastal logistical support ship) and the Ponza class (lighthouse and maritime signaling service ship). 10 planned in total with financing approved, 2 ordered in December 2023 to T.Mariotti.
MTC-F class	8	–	Auxiliary coastal transport and lighthouse assistance units	–	–	Successor of the Gorgona class (coastal logistical support ship) and the Ponza class (lighthouse and maritime signaling service ship). 10 planned in total with financing approved, 2 ordered in December 2023 to T.Mariotti.
Underwater support vessels (1)
UBoS class	1	–	Underwater remediation vessel (mines / explosive devices and other seabed objects recovery and/or neutralisation)	–	1,000 tonnes	The UBOS was approved to be built and replace the Anteo ship. Ship to be assigned to the Diving and Special Operations Command COMSUBIN. In 2022 though, no offer was made by the industry on this programme the manufacturer is yet to be chosen.
Hydrographic survey (2)
NIOC class	2	–	Coastal oceanographic survey vessel	–	2,000 tonnes	Successor to the Ninfe class. To be used mostly in the Mediterranean.
NIOC class	2	–	Coastal oceanographic survey vessel	–	2,000 tonnes	Successor to the Ninfe class. To be used mostly in the Mediterranean.
Barges (3)
Barge (300 m^{3} fuel capacity)	3	–	Fuel transport barge	–	–	Financing for the programme approved in 2021. No offer was received, for that programme, and a tender was relaunched in December 2023.
Barge (300 m^{3} fuel capacity)	3	–	Fuel transport barge	–	–	Financing for the programme approved in 2021. No offer was received, for that programme, and a tender was relaunched in December 2023.
Barge (300 m^{3} fuel capacity)	3	–	Fuel transport barge	–	–	Financing for the programme approved in 2021. No offer was received, for that programme, and a tender was relaunched in December 2023.

== Expected investments ==
This list only includes plans of future investments that are official, but that haven't yet been financed by the parliament.

=== Surface warships fleet ===
Class	Planned purchases	Picture	Type	Planned comm.	Disp.	Notes
Amphibious warfare ships (9)
Nuova Unità Anfibia - LXD class	3	–	Amphibious assault, landing helicopter dock	–	19,000 tonnes	San Giorgio class replacement by 2028 - 2030. €1.226 billion for the development of 3 new amphibious ships.
Nuova Unità Anfibia - LXD class	3	–	Amphibious assault, landing helicopter dock	–	19,000 tonnes	San Giorgio class replacement by 2028 - 2030. €1.226 billion for the development of 3 new amphibious ships.
Nuova Unità Anfibia - LXD class	3	–	Amphibious assault, landing helicopter dock	–	19,000 tonnes	San Giorgio class replacement by 2028 - 2030. €1.226 billion for the development of 3 new amphibious ships.
LC23 class	6	–	LCM	–	200 tonnes	4 are already ordered, for the Trieste. Now 6 crafts are planned with th LXD.
LC23 class	6	–	LCM	–	200 tonnes	4 are already ordered, for the Trieste. Now 6 crafts are planned with th LXD.
LC23 class	6	–	LCM	–	200 tonnes	4 are already ordered, for the Trieste. Now 6 crafts are planned with th LXD.
LC23 class	6	–	LCM	–	200 tonnes	4 are already ordered, for the Trieste. Now 6 crafts are planned with th LXD.
LC23 class	6	–	LCM	–	200 tonnes	4 are already ordered, for the Trieste. Now 6 crafts are planned with th LXD.
LC23 class	6	–	LCM	–	200 tonnes	4 are already ordered, for the Trieste. Now 6 crafts are planned with th LXD.
Frigates (3)
Thaon di Revel class PPA Full	3		frigate	–	6,200 tonnes	Three additional PPA planned-
Thaon di Revel class PPA Full	3		frigate	–	6,200 tonnes	Three additional PPA planned-
Thaon di Revel class PPA Full	3		frigate	–	6,200 tonnes	Three additional PPA planned-
Corvettes (8)
EPC / MMPC class	8		Corvette (modular / multirole)	From 2030	3,000 tonnes	Successor of the Comandanti class.
EPC / MMPC class	8		Corvette (modular / multirole)	–	3,000 tonnes	Successor of the Comandanti class.
EPC / MMPC class	8		Corvette (modular / multirole)	–	3,000 tonnes	Successor of the Comandanti class.
EPC / MMPC class	8		Corvette (modular / multirole)	–	3,000 tonnes	Successor of the Comandanti class.
EPC / MMPC class	8		Corvette (modular / multirole)	–	3,000 tonnes	Successor of the Comandanti class.
EPC / MMPC class	8		Corvette (modular / multirole)	–	3,000 tonnes	Successor of the Comandanti class.
EPC / MMPC class	8		Corvette (modular / multirole)	–	3,000 tonnes	Successor of the Comandanti class.
EPC / MMPC class	8		Corvette (modular / multirole)	–	3,000 tonnes	Successor of the Comandanti class.

=== Support and auxiliary ships ===
Class	Planned purchases	Picture	Type	Planned comm.	Disp.	Notes
Logistic support (1)
Vulcano class	1		Logistic support ship	–	27,200 tonnes	2 are already ordered, 3 are financed. A total of 4 ships is planned.
Tugboats (2)
La Spezia shipyard S.I.M.A.N	2	–	Seagoing tugboats	–	500 tonnes (full load draft)	Batch II, option for other 2 Seagoing tugboats for €19.548 million.
La Spezia shipyard S.I.M.A.N	2	–	Seagoing tugboats	–	500 tonnes (full load draft)	Batch II, option for other 2 Seagoing tugboats for €19.548 million.

== See also ==
- List of decommissioned ships of the Italian Navy

Other maritime organisations of Italy:

- List of Guardia di Finanza vessels
- List of Italian Coast Guard vessels
