= Gregoretti =

Gregoretti is a name of Italian origin. Notable persone with this name include:

- Lucio Gregoretti, an Italian composer
- Ugo Gregoretti, an Italian film, television and stage director, actor, screenwriter, author and television host
- Bruno Gregoretti (CP920), multipurpose vessel built for the Italian Coast Guard as an offshore patrol vessel
