= Mazzinghi-class patrol boat =

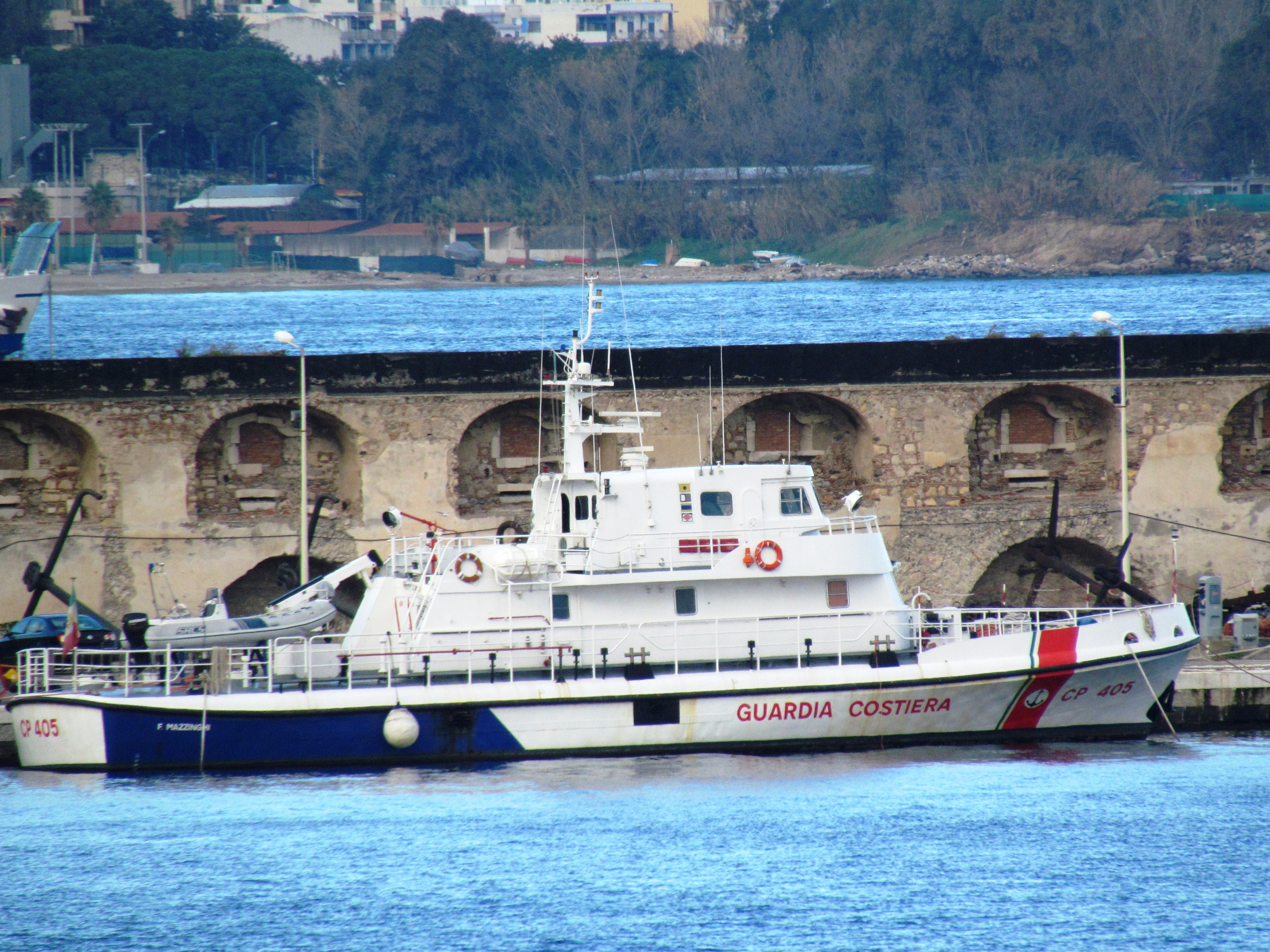
- CP 405 Francesco Mazzinghi docked to Messina in 2011

Class overview
- Builders: Bacino di Carenaggio Spa Trapani
- Operators: Italy Corps of the Port Captaincies – Coast Guard
- In commission: 1990/1991
- Completed: 4
- Active: 4

General characteristics
- Type: Fishery Patrol Vessel
- Displacement: 136 t (134 long tons), standard
- Length: 29.5 m (96 ft 9 in) LOA
- Beam: 6.7 m (22 ft 0 in)
- Draught: 1.8 m (5 ft 11 in)
- Propulsion: - 2 x shaft; - 4 x diesel engines CRM 12 D/SS, 4 x 1,540 kW (2,070 bhp); - 4 x diesel engines generators Isotta Fraschini V1712 MLL
- Speed: 22 knots (41 km/h; 25 mph)
- Range: 900 nautical miles (1,700 km; 1,000 mi) at 18 knots (33 km/h; 21 mph)
- Boats & landing craft carried: 1 × Dinghy with outboard engine
- Complement: - crew: 16; - rescues: 50
- Sensors & processing systems: 2 x Furuno navigation radars
- Armament: 2 x MG 42/59 7,62 mm machine guns
- Notes: equipped with 1 x crane

Mazzinghi CP405 is a deep-sea FPV - Fishery Patrol Vessel of the Italian Coast Guard, built in Bacino di Carenaggio Spa, Trapani shipyard.

== Features ==
The Mazzinghi CP405 patrol boat class was built in four vessels, with hull in steel FE510D.

== Vessels ==
Italy Coast Guard - Mazzinghi CP405 class
Name	Picture	Pennant number	Launched	Commissioned	IMO MMSI	Note
Francesco Mazzinghi		CP-405	1990	4 March 1991	// 247035900	
Antonio Scialoja		CP-406	13 January 1990		// 247027700	refitted between November 2013 and April 2014 to Gaeta (Latina) shipyards used for scientifics roles, fitted with ROV, Side Scan Sonar, etc.
Michele Lolini		CP-407	1990		8897942 //	
Mario Grabar		CP-408	1990	1991	8968040 //	
