= Italian patrol boat Giulio Ingianni =

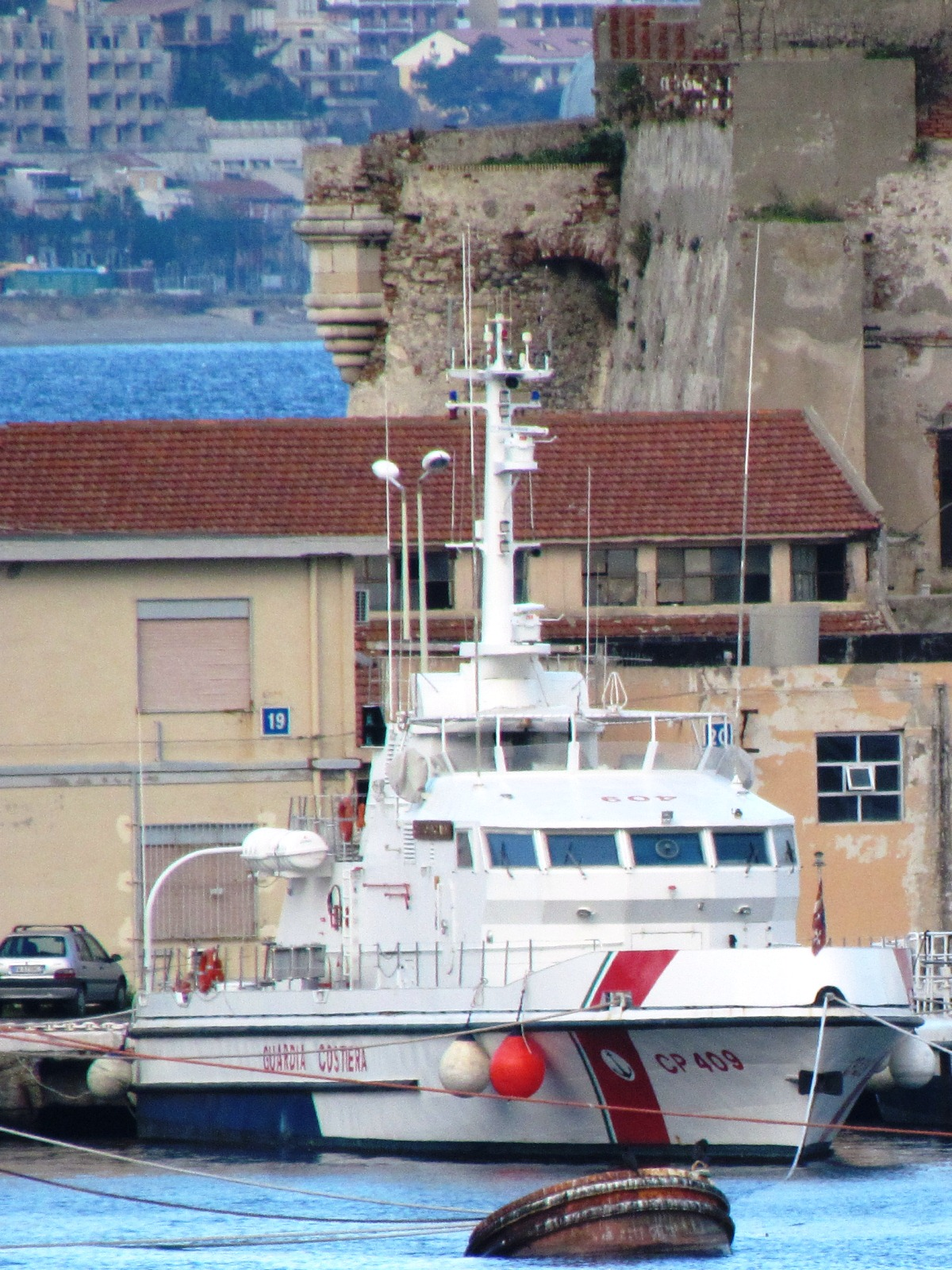
- Giulio Ingianni (CP 409)

Class overview
- Builders: Fincantieri CRN Ancona (refitted by SIMAN shipyards in La Spezia)
- Operators: Italy Corps of the Port Captaincies – Coast Guard
- In commission: 13 June 1992
- Completed: 1
- Active: 1

General characteristics
- Type: Patrol Boat
- Displacement: - 245 t (241 long tons), full load; - 220 t (217 long tons), standard
- Length: 34.6 m (113 ft 6 in) LOA
- Beam: 7.15 m (23 ft 5 in)
- Draught: 2.06 m (6 ft 9 in)
- Propulsion: 2 x diesel engines Caterpillar 3512S, 2 x 1,765 kW (2,367 bhp)
- Speed: 21 knots (39 km/h; 24 mph)
- Range: 886 nautical miles (1,641 km; 1,020 mi) at 18 knots (33 km/h; 21 mph)
- Boats & landing craft carried: 1 × Dinghy with outboard engine
- Complement: 15
- Sensors & processing systems: 2 x Furuno navigation radars
- Armament: 2 x MG 42/59 7,62 mm machine guns

Giulio Ingianni is a deep-sea patrol boat of the Italian Coast Guard, built in Fincantieri CRN Ancona shipyard and delivered June 13, 1992 in the presence of the Minister of Merchant Marine Facchiano.

== Features ==
The boat was built as a single copy, with a displacement of 205 tons, an overall length of 34.5 meters, a width of 7.15 meters, and was built with a steel hull with its superstructure being a steel alloy.

The boat was equipped with two Isotta Fraschini ID 36 SS 16 V.200 diesel engines that allow a maximum speed of 21 knots with a range of 1,000 nautical miles. It also carries a dinghy with outboard motor.

In 2012 was refitted by SIMAN shipyards in La Spezia, with a few updates, as new Caterpillar diesel engines and displacement increased to 245 tons.

== Service ==
Giulio Ingianni is based at the Coast of Messina, in the course of its service it has been deployed on missions in Albania, in Vlora, and Saseno.

== Namesake ==
The ship is named after Giulio Ingianni, General of the Coast Guard, the general commander of the Coast Guard and senator of the Kingdom of Italy. Giulio Ingianni was born in Marsala in Trapani Province December 18, 1876 and died in Rome on 10 July 1958.

Giulio Ingianni whilst at the rank of Captain of the Port had participated in the First World War, operating in the Adriatic. After the war he took part in Paris at the "Commission for the Repairs of the War", and worked actively to ensure that the naval heritage of Venezia Giulia, was not divided among the victorious powers of the war. He returned to Italy in 1921, where he held the "Independent Ports Consortium of Special Commissioner Offices of Genoa" and "Regent of the Directorate General of Merchant Shipping". On April 19, 1926, he was appointed General Chief Inspector of the Coast Guard, staying in this position until 1928, whilst remaining the Director General of Merchant Marine, a position he held until July 1944.

After leaving the Coast Guard in 1939 he was appointed a Senator of the Kingdom, but was recalled to active duty during World War II, serving until 1944.

After World War II, he retired from public life in 1953 receiving the title of Grand Officer of Merit of the Italian Republic, for his commitment and dedication over the course of his life to the Italian Navy and of the Corps of the Port Captaincies – Coast Guard.
