= National Aeronaval Service =

National Aeronaval Service Servicio Nacional Aeronaval de Panamá
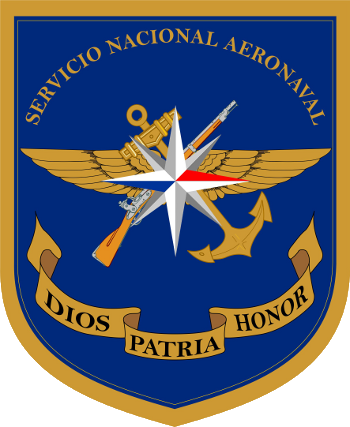
- National Aeronaval Service shield

- Roundel of Panama

- Low visibility roundel

- Racing Stripe
- Abbreviation: SENAN
- Motto: Dios, Patria y Honor; God, Fatherland and Honor

Agency overview
- Formed: August 8, 2008

Jurisdictional structure
- Operations jurisdiction: Panama
- Specialist jurisdiction: Coastal patrol, marine border protection, marine search and rescue

Operational structure
- Sworn members: 3,700 officers
- Agency executive: Director General Luis Antonio De Gracia, Commandant
- Parent agency: Panamanian Public Forces

Website
- www.aeronaval.gob.pa

The National Aeronaval Service of Panama, also called SENAN (abbreviation for Spanish: Servicio Nacional Aeronaval), is a branch of the Panamanian Public Forces which is responsible for carrying out naval and air operations. Its role is to perform protection, surveillance, security and defense of the air and maritime jurisdictional areas. The service has approximately 3,700 personnel, with 19 boats and approximately 24 aircraft.

== Introduction ==
The SENAN is the result of a merger between the former National Maritime Service and the National Air Service of Panama in 2008. The unit was created as civilian police forces and component of the Public Forces attached to Ministry of Public Security, protect rights and freedoms of people, maintain public order, prevent and investigate crimes, and protect the air and maritime jurisdictional areas, thus contributing to public policy, humanitarian relief and facilitating an environment for development social and economic development of Panama.

According to the national law, the SENAN will act as a public security entity in the maritime, air, port and airport areas throughout the national territory, by performing the following functions:

== Organisation ==
The organisation of SENAN consist of:

- Political-Director Level
  - Director General as head of SENAN.
  - Deputy Director General, along with Director General are appointed by President of Panama with recommendation of Ministry of Public Security.
- Advisory Level: General Directory, General Inspectorate, General Secretariat and Legal Department.
- Investigator Level: Internal Auditor and Internal Affairs.
- Auxiliary Support Level: National Directorate of Comprehensive Action, National Directorate of Human Resources, National Directorate of Logistics and General Services, National Directorate of Administration and Finances, National Directorate of Aerial Maintenance, National Directorate of Naval Maintenance and National Directorate of Teaching.
- Operational Level: National Directorate of Intelligence, National Directorate of Operations, National Directorate of Technology, National Directorate of Territorial Surveillance and three Aeronaval Region.

=== Base ===
The SENAN's bases and stations are located within three region of Aeronaval.

1st Region (Primera Región)	2nd Region (Segunda Región)	3rd Region (Tercera Región)
Chiriqui Grande Aeronaval Station; Quebrada de Piedra Aeronaval Station; Coiba Aeronaval Station; De Rambala Air Station; Mayor Azael Adames Air Station; Subteniente Vicente Vargas Air Station	Captain Lloyd Nunez Command Base; Almirante Cristobal Colon Aeronaval Base; Vasco Nuñez de Balboa Naval Base; Captain Juan Delgado Air Base; Isla Chapera Aeronaval Station; Punta Coco Aeronaval Station; Mensabe Aeronaval Station; de Chame Air Station; Octavio Rodriguez Garrido Air Station	Major Salvador Cordoba Air Station

== Personnel ==
As of 2024, SENAN personnel consist of approximately 3,700 sworn officers and 200 administrative personnel. Sworn officers perform SENAN tasks and missions, while administrative personnel only conduct administrative and technical functions.

Sworn offices are consist of following levels:

Commissioned officer ranks

Rank group	General / flag officers		Senior officers			Junior officers
(Panama) National Aeronaval Service
(Panama) National Aeronaval Service	Comandante Aeronaval	Subdirector General Aeronaval	Comisionado	Subcomisionado	Mayor	Capitán	Teniente	Subteniente

Other ranks

Rank group	Senior NCOs		Junior NCOs		Enlisted
(Panama) National Aeronaval Service					No insignia
(Panama) National Aeronaval Service	Sargento primero	Sargento segundo	Cabo primero	Cabo segundo	Agente

As branch of Public Forces, SENAN personnel can be transferred to another police service according to service needs and vice versa.

== Equipment ==
=== Aircraft ===
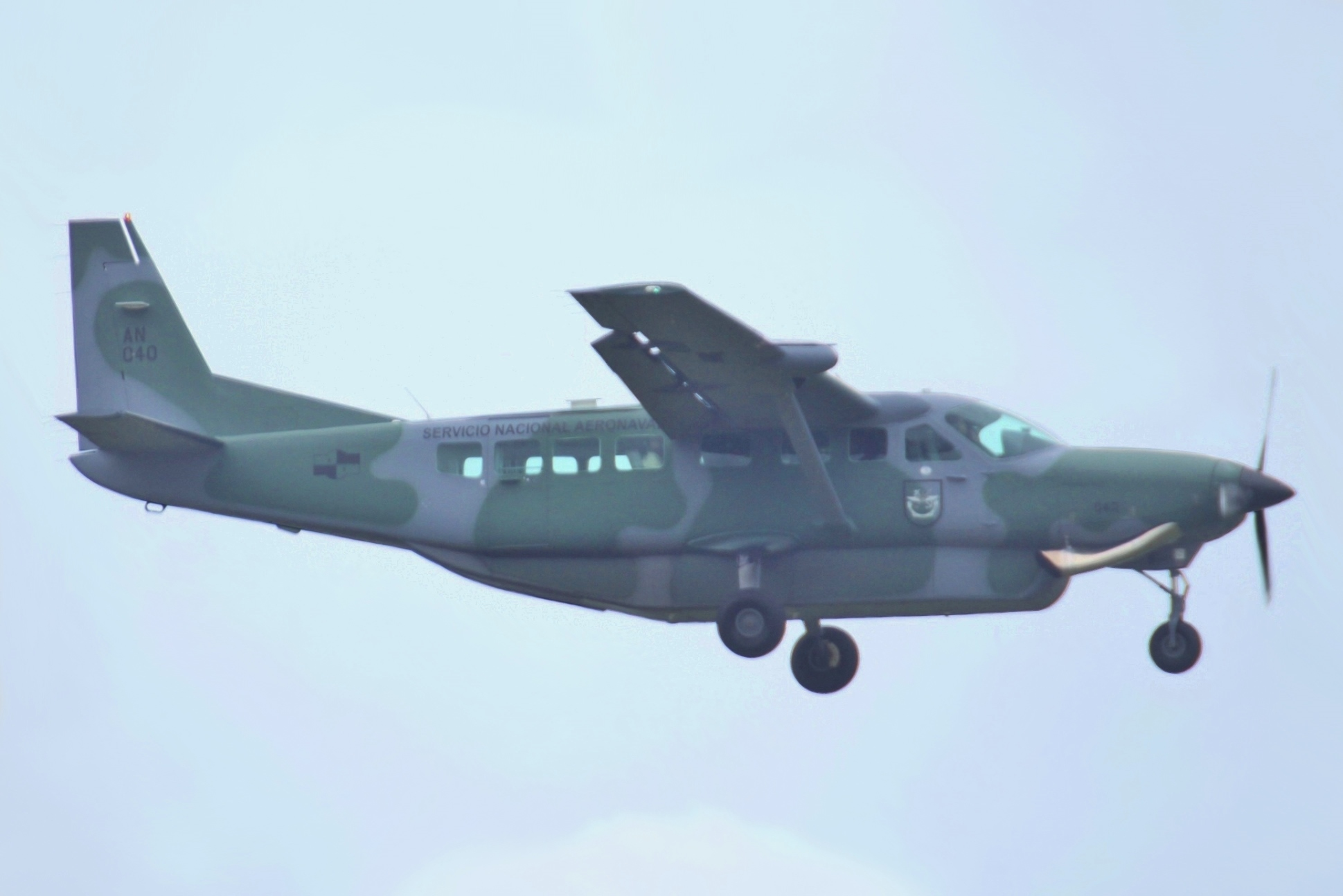
Panama's Servicio Nacional Aeronaval Cessna 208B

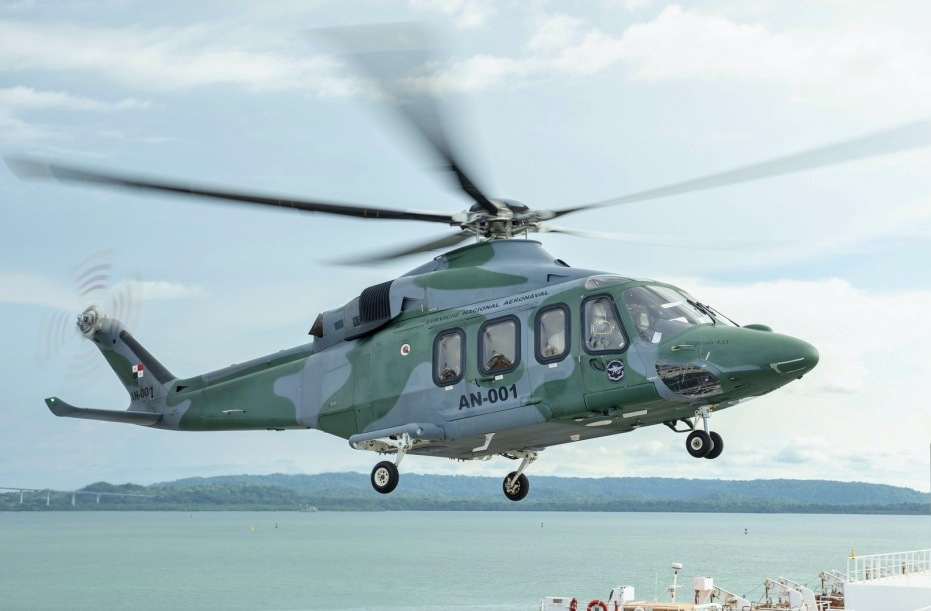
An AW-139 helicopter landing on USNS Comfort

Aircraft	Origin	Type	Variant	In service	Notes
Attack
Embraer EMB 314 Super Tucano	Brazil	light attack		4 (on order)	
Transport
CASA 295	Spain	Tactical transport		2 (on order)	
Super King Air	United States	utility	100/250/350	3	
DHC-6 Twin Otter	Canada	utility transport		2	STOL capable aircraft
CASA C-212	Spain	utility / transport		3	
Cessna 152	United States	transport		2	
Cessna 172	United States	transport		1	
Cessna 208	United States	MEDEVAC		2	
Cessna 210	United States	transport		1	
Embraer ERJ-135BJ	Brazil	transport		1	
Piper PA-31	United States	transport / patrol		1	
Piper PA-34	United States	utility		2	
Helicopters
AgustaWestland AW139	Italy	SAR		8	
Bell 412	United States	SAR / utility		1	
McDonnell Douglas MD500	United States	patrol		1	
AgustaWestland AW109	Italy	MEDEVAC		1	
Bell 212	United States	transport		2	
Bell 407	United States	transport		2	
Bell UH-1	United States	utility	UH-1H	6	donated by United States
Trainer aircraft
T-35 Pillán	Chile	trainer		4	

=== Vessels ===
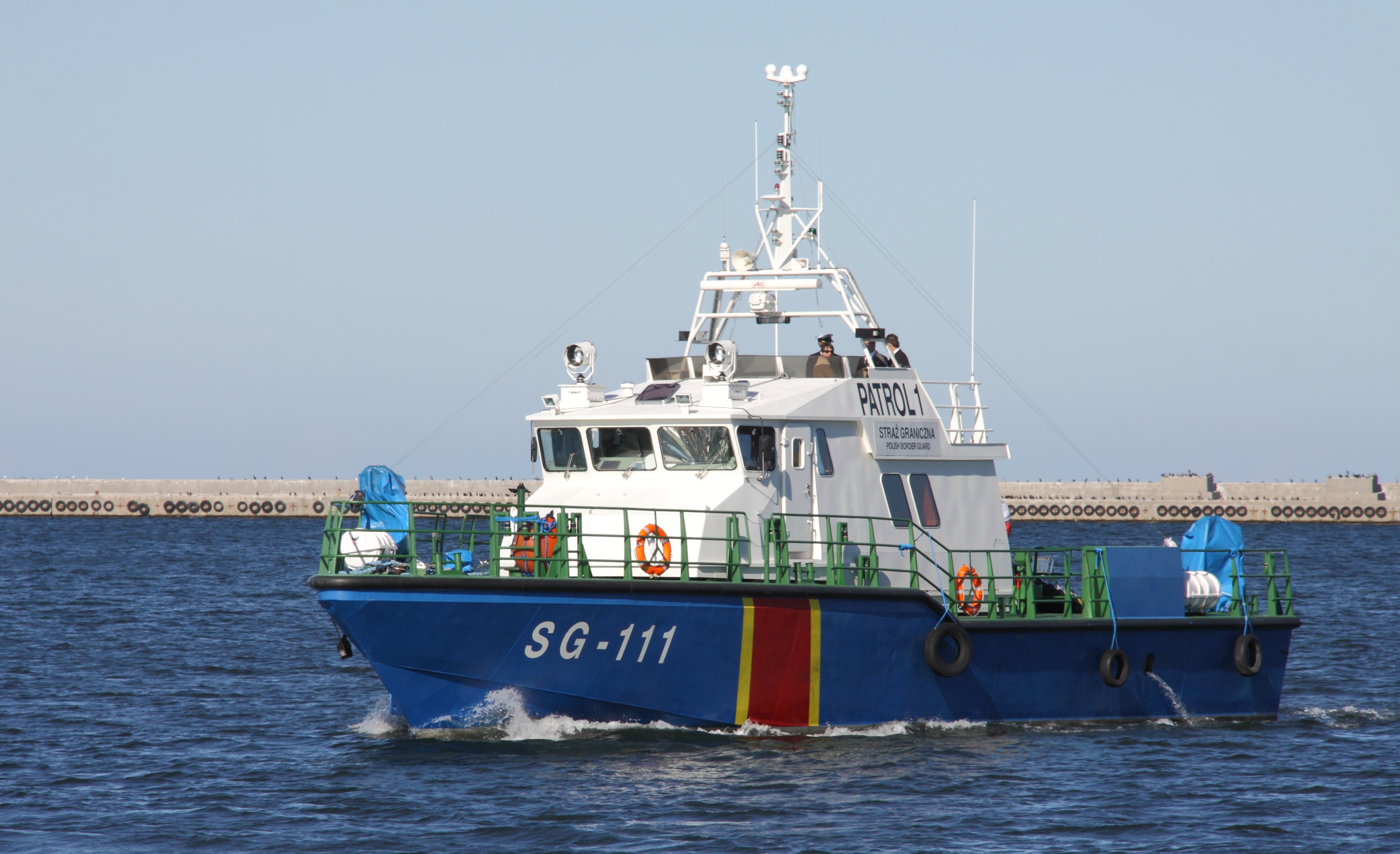
A patrol boat similar to this one is used by the SENAN

Vessel	Origin	Type	Class	Notes
Patrol boat
P-901	Italy	coastal enforcement	Class 900	
P-302 Ligia Elena	United Kingdom	patrol boat	Vosper class	
P-301 Panquiaco	United Kingdom	patrol boat	Vosper class	
P-204 3 de Noviembre	United States	patrol boat	Point class	
P-206 10 de Noviembre	United States	patrol boat	Point class	
P-207 28 de Noviembre	United States	patrol boat	Point class	
P-208 4 de Noviembre	United States	patrol boat	Point class	
P-209 5 de Noviembre	United States	patrol boat	Point class	
P-220 Pdte. Guillermo Endara	Italy	patrol boat	Super 200 class	
P-221 Pdte. Ernesto P. Balladares	Italy	patrol boat	Super 200 class	
P-222 Pdte. Mireya Moscoso	Italy	patrol boat	Super 200 class	
P-223 Pdte. Martin Torrijose Herrera	Italy	patrol boat	Super 200 class	
P-814 Coclé	United States	patrol boat	Mark-II class	
P-843 Bocas del Toro	United States	patrol boat	Mark-IV class	
Support vessels
L-24 Lina Maria	Colombia	Support vessel	Logistica class	
A-401 Independencia	United States	Support vessel	Buoy Tender class	
A-402 General Esteban Huertas	United States	Support vessel	Barcaza class	second hand from the U.S. Navy
L-403 Presidente Manuel A. Guerrero	United States	Support vessel		
Special boat
Hunter Class	Honduras	fast boat		2 in service
Nor-Tech	United States	maritime interdiction	BIM 43 Class	4 in service
Eduardoño Class	Colombia	fast boat		5 in service
Donzin Class	United States	fast boat		2 in service
