= 200/S-class patrol boat =

Italian Coast Guard patrol boat class

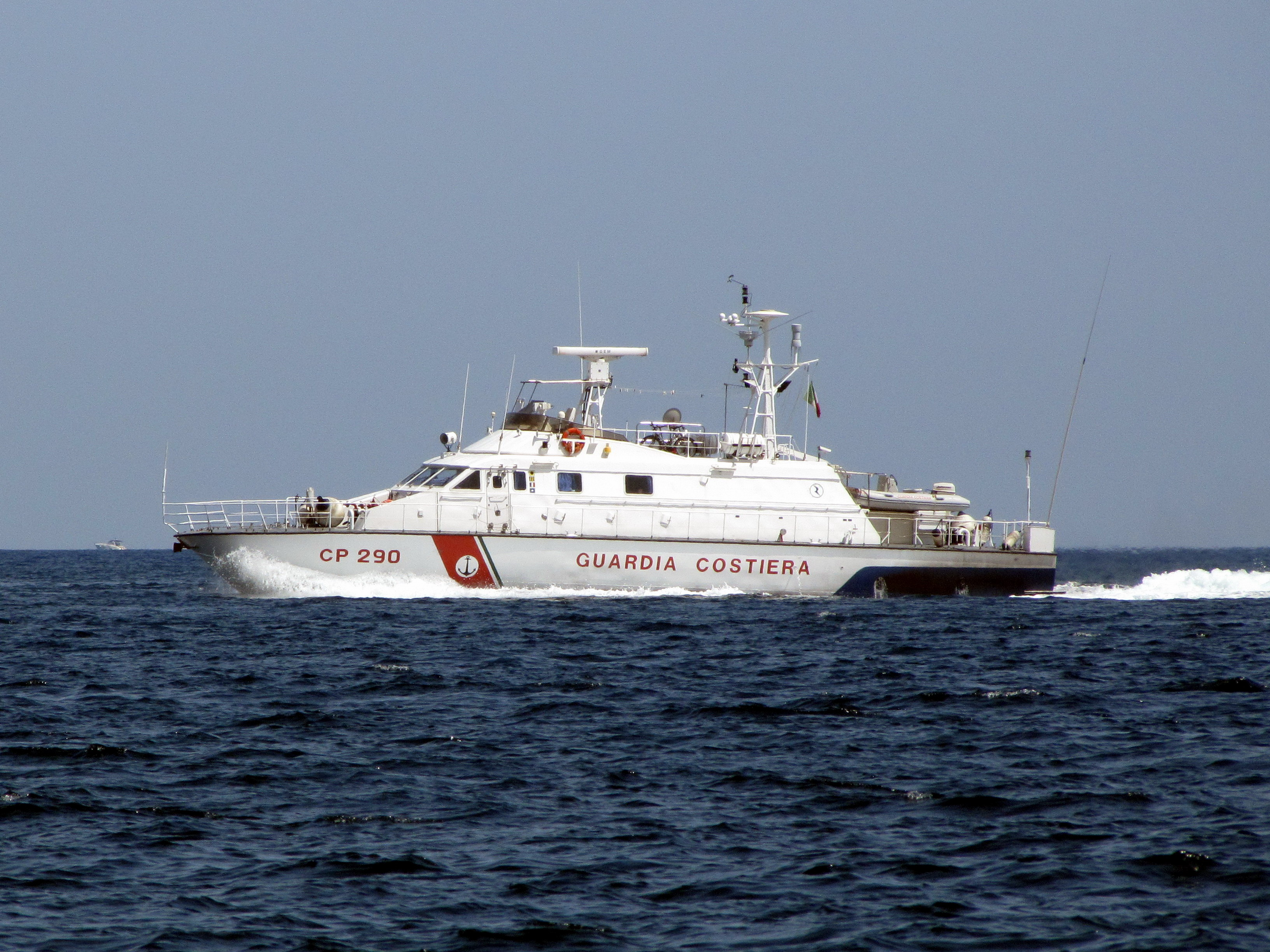
- CP 290 patrol boat on Mediterranean Sea near Palermo in 2010

Class overview
- Builders: Rodriquez Cantieri Navali Group (Messina) (now Intermarine Group)
- Operators: - Italy Corps of the Port Captaincies – Coast Guard; - Panama SENAN
- In commission: 2001/2005
- Completed: 28 (all for Italy)
- Active: - 28: - 22 with Italian Coast Guard; - 4 with SENAN; - 2 with Nigeria merchant fleet

General characteristics
- Type: Patrol Boat
- Displacement: - 58 t (57 long tons), full load; - 53 t (52 long tons), standard
- Length: 25 m (82 ft 0 in) LOA
- Beam: 5.76 m (18 ft 11 in)
- Draught: 1.2 m (3 ft 11 in)
- Propulsion: - 2 x lateral drive fixed pitch propellers and 1 x central booster water jet; - 3 x diesel engines Isotta Fraschini V1312 T2 MSL, 3 x 735 kW (986 bhp)
- Speed: 34 knots (63 km/h; 39 mph), max
- Range: - 900 nautical miles (1,700 km; 1,000 mi) at 18 knots (33 km/h; 21 mph); - 621 nautical miles (1,150 km; 715 mi) at 34 knots (63 km/h; 39 mph)
- Boats & landing craft carried: 1 × 4.3 mt Dinghy with outboard engine
- Complement: crew: 8
- Sensors & processing systems: - 2 x GEM Elettronica navigation radars; - 1 x GEM Elettronica IRST EOSS-100
- Armament: 1 x MG 42/59 7,62 mm machine guns

The 200/S class is a deep-sea patrol boat of the Italian Coast Guard, built by Rodriquez Cantieri Navali Group (Messina) (now Intermarine Group).

== Features ==
The 200/S class patrol boats are characterised by high speed and excellent seaworthiness. They have aluminium hulls and have been designed to comply with Italian Coast Guard requirements. Propulsion is provided by two lateral diesel engines, each driving a fixed-pitch propeller, and by one central diesel engine couplet with a “booster” waterjet. The boats are able to achieve a speed of 34 knots. 28 boats have been built.

== Vessels ==
Italy Coast Guard - 200/S class
Pennant number	Picture	Launched	Commissioned	Decommissioned	IMO MMSI	Note
CP265			21 February 2001		// 247837000	
CP266			24 April 2001	2 May 2011	// 247838000	Since 31 May 2012 delivered to SENAN as PC 220 "Presidente Guillermo Endara"
CP267			22 June 2001		// 247839000	
CP268			18 October 2001		// 247020100	
CP269				2011	// 657105500	since 2011 sell to Tethys Plantgeria Ltd Nigeria as Conqueror Tre
CP270			7 February 2002	10 May 2011	// 247020300	Since 31 May 2012 delivered to SENAN as PC 221 "Presidente Ernesto P. Balladares"
CP271					// 247020400	
CP272			7 February 2002	10 May 2011	// 247020500	Since 31 May 2012 delivered to SENAN as PC 222 "Presidente Mireya Moscoso"
CP273		2002	21 March 2002		// 247020600	
CP274					// 247020700	
CP275			7 February 2002	10 May 2011	// 247264300	Since 31 May 2012 delivered to SENAN as PC 223 "Presidente Martín Torrijos"
CP276			2002		// 247020900	
CP277			2002		// 247021100	
CP278			2002		// 247021200	
CP279			2002	October 2011	// 657847000	since 2011 sell to Tethys Plantgeria Ltd Nigeria as Conqueror Due
CP280			16 December 2002		// 247021400	
CP281			16 December 2002		// 247021500	
CP282			16 December 2002		// 247021600	
CP283					// 247021700	
CP284			12 February 2004		// //	
CP285			2003		// 247021900	
CP286			2003		// 247022100	
CP287			16 December 2004		// 247022200	
CP288			8 April 2005		// 247022300	
CP289			13 April 2005		// 247022400	
CP290			26 May 2003		// 247084500	
CP291			26 May 2003		// 247084600	
CP292			26 May 2003		// 247084700	
