= Cavallari-class patrol boat =

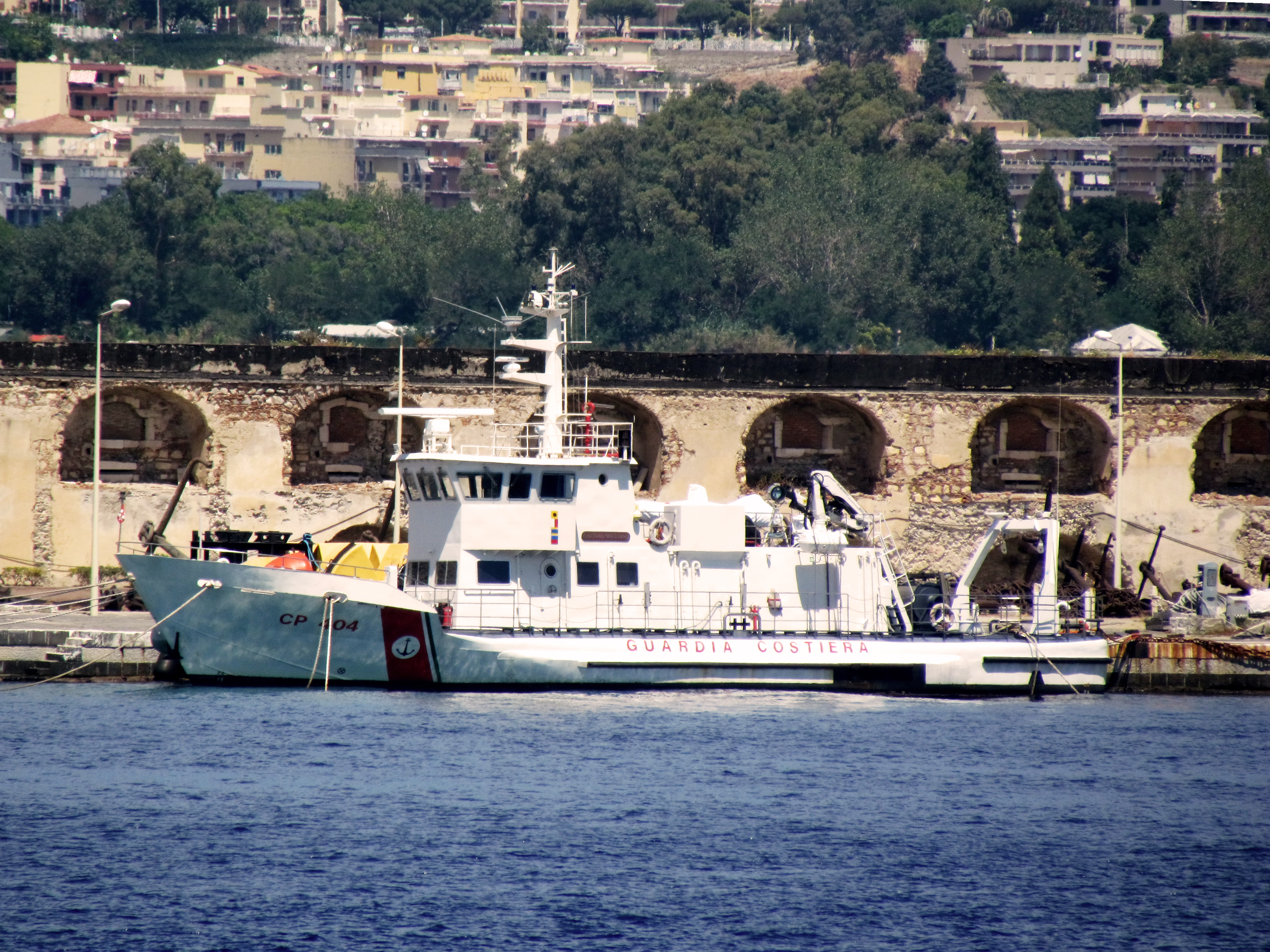
- FPV Gaetano Magliano

Class overview
- Builders: CRN shipyard in Ancona (refitted by SIMAN shipyards in La Spezia)
- Operators: Italy Corps of the Port Captaincies – Coast Guard Albanian Naval Force
- In commission: 1989/1990
- Completed: 4
- Active: 4

General characteristics
- Type: Fishery Patrol Vessel
- Displacement: - 156.45 t (154 long tons) full load; - 130 t (128 long tons), standard
- Length: 29.58 m (97 ft 1 in) LOA
- Beam: 7.03 m (23 ft 1 in)
- Draught: 3.38 m (11 ft 1 in)
- Propulsion: - 2 x diesel engines Caterpillar C32, 2 x 1,193 kW (1,600 bhp); - 2 x shaft
- Speed: 17 knots (31 km/h; 20 mph)
- Range: 500 nautical miles (930 km; 580 mi)
- Boats & landing craft carried: 1 × Dinghy with outboard engine
- Complement: - crew: 11; - rescues: 50
- Sensors & processing systems: 2 x Furuno navigation radars
- Armament: 2 x MG 42/59 7,62 mm machine guns
- Notes: equipped with 1 x crane Pellegrini GN 1/4 (10 tons to 4 m)

Cavallari CP400 is a deep-sea FPV – Fishery Patrol Vessel of the Italian Coast Guard, built in CRN shipyard in Ancona.

== Features ==
The Cavallari CP400 patrol boat class was built in four vessels, to CRN shipyards in Ancona, with hull in steel FE510D.

Between 2010 and 2012 vessels was refitted by SIMAN shipyards in La Spezia, with a few updates. Original four diesel engines Isotta Fraschini ID36 SS8V, 3,520 kW (4,720 bhp), for 22 knots (41 km/h; 25 mph) max speed and 1,000 nautical miles (1,900 km; 1,200 mi) range, were replaced by new Caterpillar diesel engines and displacement increased from 130 to 156 tons.

== Vessels ==
Italy Coast Guard – Cavallari CP400 class
Name	Picture	Pennant number	Hull number	Laid down	Launched	Commissioned	IMO MMSI	Note
Oreste Cavallari		CP-401	101	1988	1989	1989	8968129 //	
Renato Pennetti		CP-402	102	1988	1990		8968131 //	refitted and recommissioned on 29 May 2012
Walter Facchin		CP-403	103	1988	1990	1 August 1990	8968155; 247309800	
Gaetano Magliano		CP-404	104	1988	1990		8968143; 247155900	refitted and recommissioned on 29 May 2012
