= Dattilo-class patrol vessel =

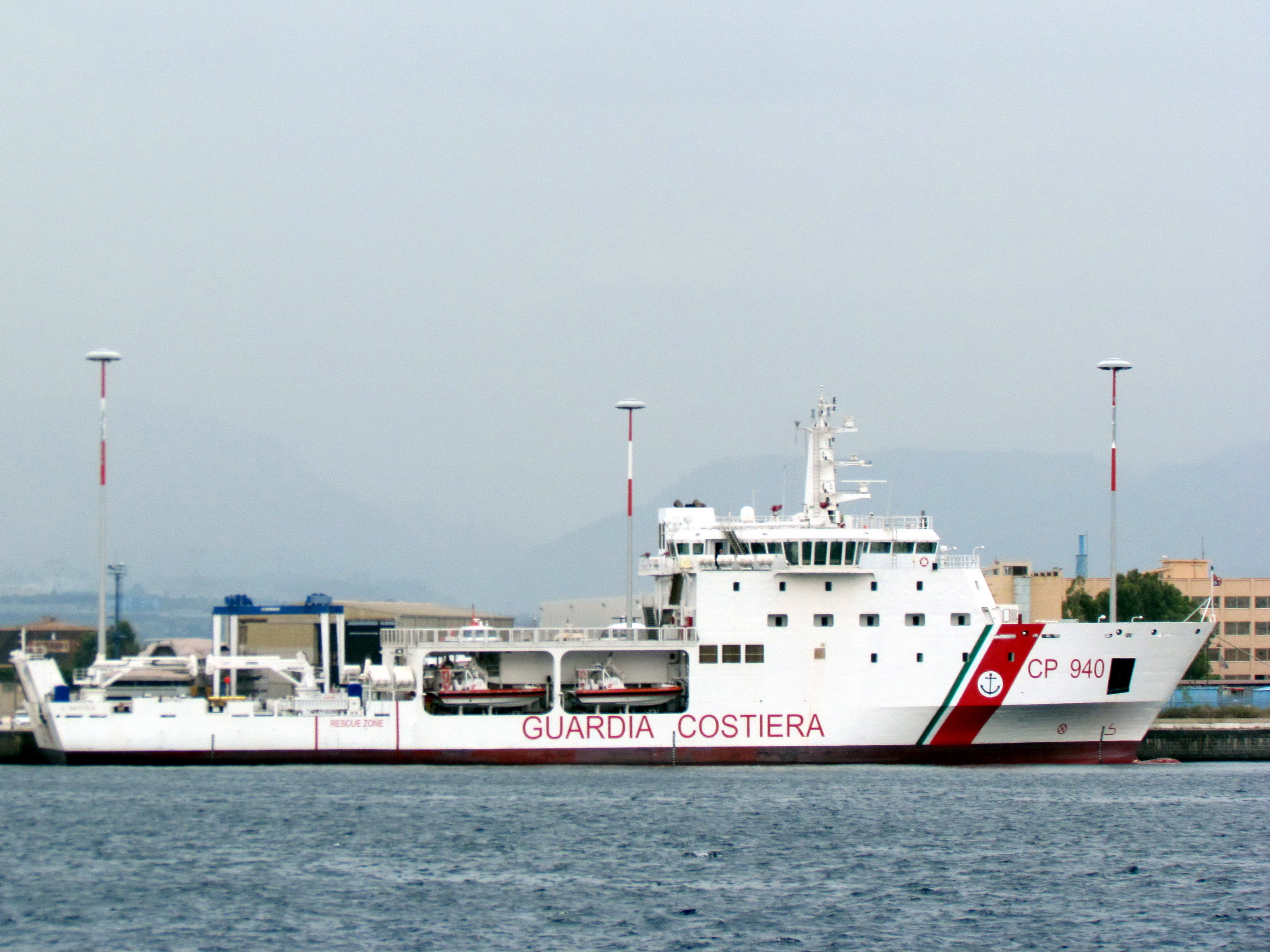
- CP-940 Dattilo docked to Messina, Italy

Class overview
- Name: Dattilo class
- Builders: Fincantieri to Cantiere Navale di Castellammare di Stabia (Naples)
- Operators: Italian Coast Guard
- In commission: 2013–present
- Planned: 3
- Building: 3
- Completed: 2
- Active: 2

General characteristics
- Type: Offshore patrol vessel
- Displacement: 3,600 t (3,543 long tons), full load
- Length: - 94.50 m (310.0 ft) LOA; - 80.00 m (262.47 ft) LPP
- Beam: - Moulded breadth 16.60 m (54.5 ft); - Max breadth 20.50 m (67.3 ft)
- Depth: 8.5 m (28 ft)
- Propulsion: - CODLOD scheme; - 2 x main diesel engines generators General Electric 12V228, 2 x 2,289 kW (3,070 bhp); - 2 x electric engines ABB mod MLA 4, 2 x 250 kW (340 bhp); - 3 x auxiliary diesel engines generators Isotta Fraschini V1708C2, 3 x 650 kW (870 bhp); - 1 x emergency diesel engine generator Isotta Fraschini V1708C2, 650 kW (870 bhp); - 2 x shafts; - 1 x bow thruster
- Speed: - max speed about 18.0 knots (20.7 mph; 33.3 km/h) (on 2 diesel engines and 2 diesel generators); - cruise speed 13.0 knots (15.0 mph; 24.1 km/h); - hybrid max speed 8.0 knots (9.2 mph; 14.8 km/h) (on 3 diesel generators)
- Range: - 4,000 nmi (7,400 km; 4,600 mi) at about 18.0 knots (20.7 mph; 33.3 km/h); - 6,500 nmi (12,000 km; 7,500 mi) at 8.0 knots (9.2 mph; 14.8 km/h)
- Endurance: 30 days
- Boats & landing craft carried: 4 x Arimar RHIB 9.2 m (30 ft), 35.0 knots (40.3 mph; 64.8 km/h)
- Capacity: accommodations for 60 rescued (but capacity for max 600)
- Complement: 41 (28 crew, 13 technicians)
- Sensors & processing systems: - 3 x radar ARPA X band Kelvin Hughes, Sharp Eye and Sea Dark; - 1 x IRST system
- Armament: - 4 x MG 42/59 machine guns; - FFBNW OTO Melara 76/62 mm Super Rapido
- Aviation facilities: NATO APP 2, flight deck for 10 t (10 long tons) helicopters (SH90A)
- Notes: - area for 6 x ISO1C containers 20 ft (6.1 m), or 10 vans or 14 cars; - anti-pollution disc-oil & rec-oil systems

The Dattilo class of offshore patrol vessels (OPVs) consists of two vessels ordered for the Italian Coast Guard.
The main mission of the OPVs is to safeguard national interests through patrolling activities and carry out anti-pollution and rescue services. The aft area is often fitted with a flight deck for the take-off and landing operations of one medium-sized helicopter. Typical features of such vessels are the extensive range as well as sea-keeping and manoeuvrability performances, which make them highly flexible from the operational point of view.

== Vessels ==
(Italy) Coast Guard - Dattilo class
Name	Picture	Pennant number	Hull number	Laid down	Launched	Commissioned	IMO MMSI
Luigi Dattilo		CP-940	6233	2 May 2012	19 December 2012	1 October 2013	9690418; 247330500
Ubaldo Diciotti		CP-941	6234	9 January 2013	15 July 2013	20 March 2014	9690420; 247330700
