= Bruno Gregoretti =

Italian Coast Guard ship built in 2014

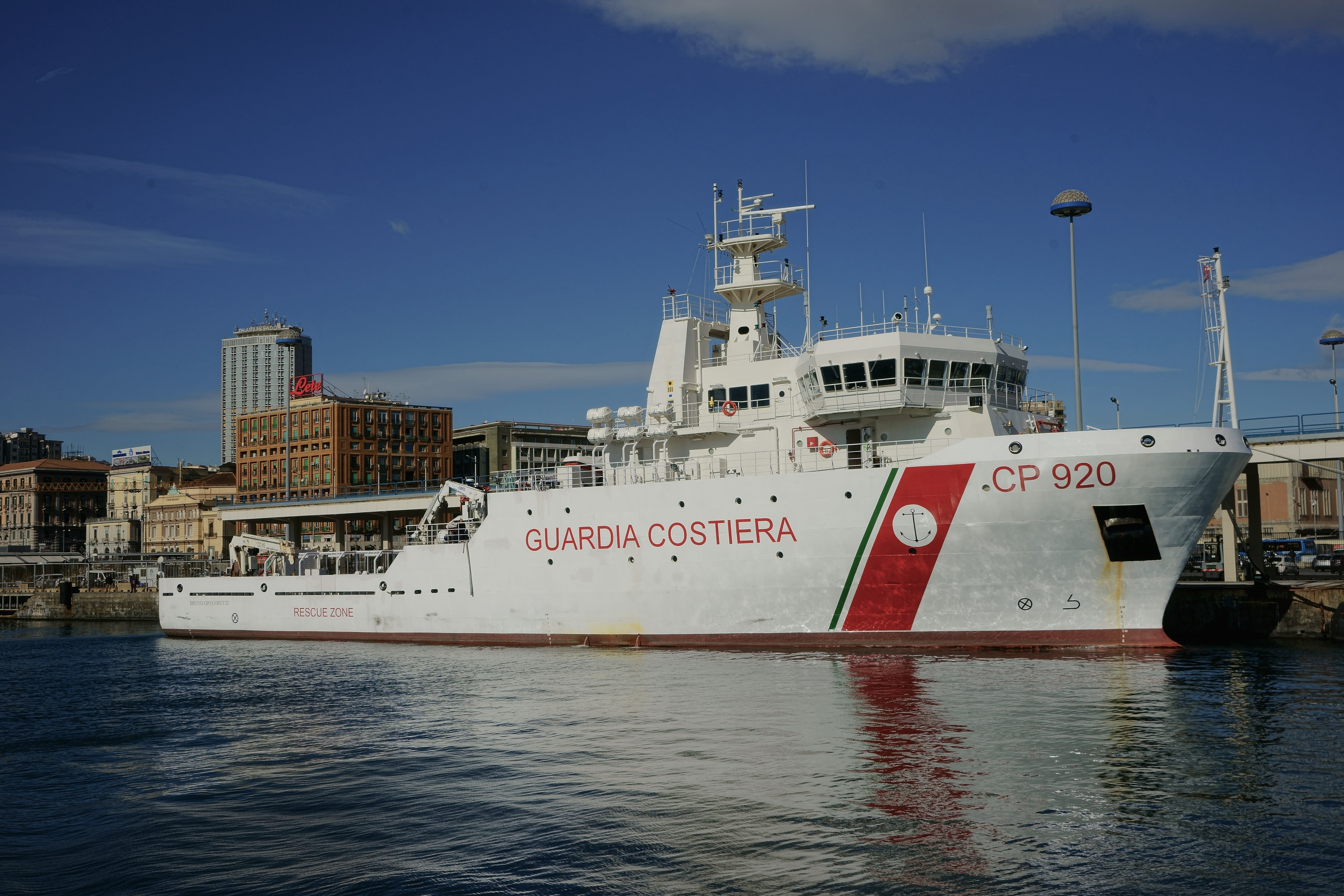
- Italian Coast Guard's Bruno Gregoretti docked in Naples

History

Italy
- Name: Bruno Gregoretti
- Ordered: 23 December 2009
- Builder: Cantiere Navale Megaride (Naples)
- Laid down: August 2010
- Launched: 14 October 2011
- Commissioned: 2014
- In service: 3 August 2014
- Identification: Pennant number: CP920; Hull number: 0951; IMO number: 9655523; MMSI number: 247329600; Callsign: IGSD
- Status: Active in service

General characteristics
- Type: Offshore patrol vessel
- Tonnage: 1,457 GT
- Displacement: 2,153 tonnes (2,119 long tons)
- Length: - 62.51 m (205 ft 1 in) LOA; - 56.27 m (184 ft 7 in) LPP
- Beam: 13.72 m (45 ft 0 in)
- Height: 7.14 m (23 ft 5 in)
- Depth: 5.02 m (16 ft 6 in)
- Propulsion: - CODLOD scheme; - 2 x diesel engines Caterpillar 3512C, 2 x 1,765 kW (2,367 bhp); - 2 x ZF 9300 PTI ‘hybrid-ready’ transmission; - 2 x electric engines Siemens, rated at 180 kW (240 bhp) each; - 4 x diesel engines generators Caterpillar C.18, 4 x 275 kW (369 bhp); - 1 x emergency diesel engine generator Caterpillar; - 2 x shafts
- Speed: 18.4 knots (34.1 km/h; 21.2 mph)
- Range: 9,900 nmi (18,300 km; 11,400 mi) at 15 knots (28 km/h; 17 mph)
- Boats & landing craft carried: 2 x 7.1 m (23 ft) RHIBs
- Complement: 31
- Sensors & processing systems: -2 x Furuno navigation radars; - C4I ASTIM Thermonav
- Armament: 2 x MG 42/59 7,62 mm machine guns
- Notes: - aft area, with ramp, for 5 x ISO1C containers 20 ft (6.1 m), or 5 van/cars; - 2 x cranes CO.VIS. 45000, 10.5 tonnes (10 long tons) to 12 m (39 ft); - 1 x crane CO.VIS. 26000, 3.8 tonnes (4 long tons) to 10.3 m (34 ft); - anti-pollution rec-oil systems

Bruno Gregoretti (CP920) is a multipurpose vessel built for the Italian Coast Guard as an offshore patrol vessel.

The ship is optimised for offshore fishery patrolling, oil spill clean-up purposes and fire fighting. The most common duties are fishery inspections and search and rescues in the Mediterranean Sea.
The ship was ordered at a price of 15.5 million euros.
