= Ponza-class transport ship =

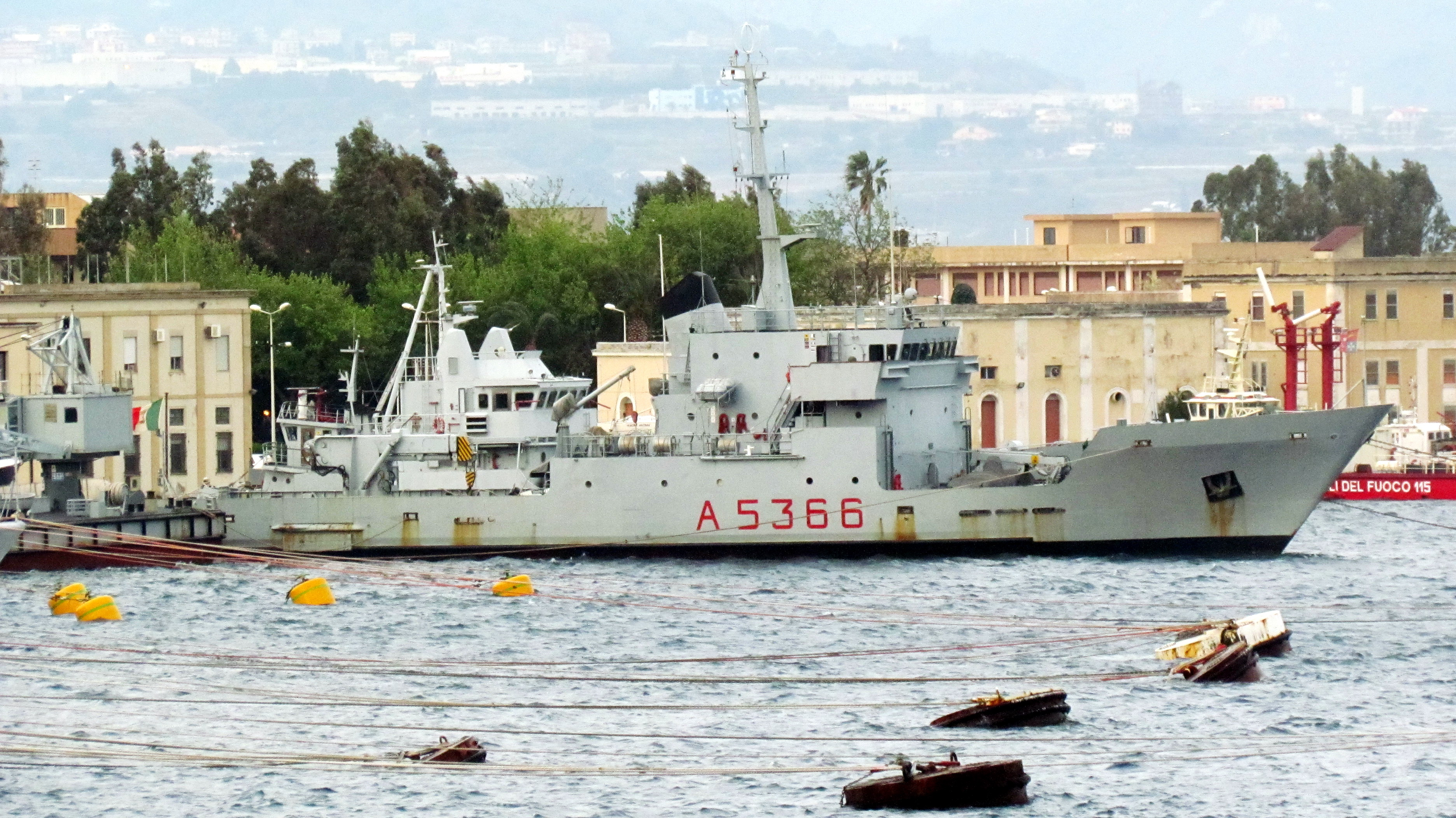
- Coastal transport ship Levanzo (A 5366), Messina, 2013

Class overview
- Name: Ponza
- Builders: Cantiere Navale Mario Morini, Ancona
- Operators: Italian Navy
- In commission: 1988-1990
- Completed: 5
- Active: 5

General characteristics
- Type: Coastal transport ship
- Displacement: - 584 t (575 long tons) / 689.89 t (678.99 long tons) full load; - 478,06 478.06 t (470.51 long tons) empty
- Length: 56.72 m (186 ft 1 in) LOA
- Beam: 10.00 m (32 ft 10 in)
- Draught: 3.06 m (10 ft 0 in)
- Propulsion: - 2 x diesel engines Isotta Fraschini ID-36-8V, 647 kW (868 bhp) each; - 2 x diesel engines generators AIFO 8281-SRM-8V, 235 kW (315 bhp) each with Ansaldo electric engine MXR-315, 380V; - 1 x diesel engine generator AIFO 8210-M6, 110 kW (150 bhp) with Ansaldo electric engine MXR-250, 380 V (for auxiliary bow thruster); - 2 x shaft and thruster; - Auxiliary bow thruster
- Speed: 14 knots (26 km/h; 16 mph)
- Range: 3,000 nmi (5,600 km; 3,500 mi)
- Crew: 32 (of which 3 officials)
- Sensors & processing systems: 1 x GEM Elettronica MM/SPN-754 v2 navigation radars
- Notes: 1 x 15 t (15 long tons) cranes

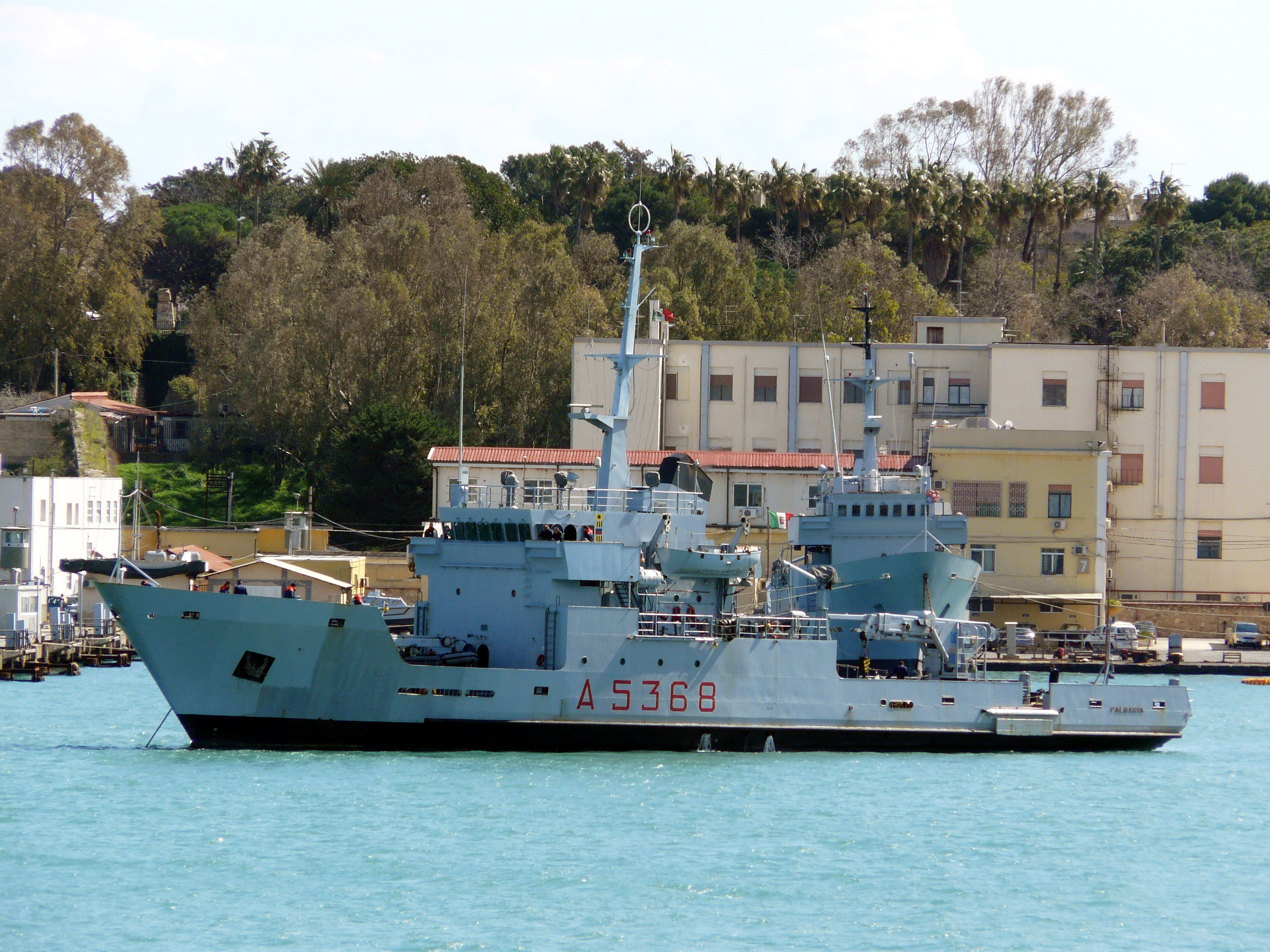
Palmaria (A 5368) in 2012

The Ponza class is a series of five Coastal transport ships of the Marina Militare, named as Moto Trasporto Fari, MTF (Lighthouses Vessels).

== Roles ==
Ponza class ships are designed for:

- The maintenance and modernization of the coastal maritime signalling and headlights
- Recovery and replacement of buoys, beacons, lights, catenaries, pylons, etc.
- Can also be used for transport of various materials as well as water and fuel or other goods for the supply of naval ships or small islands
- Minelayer roles

== Ships ==
Ponza (A5364)

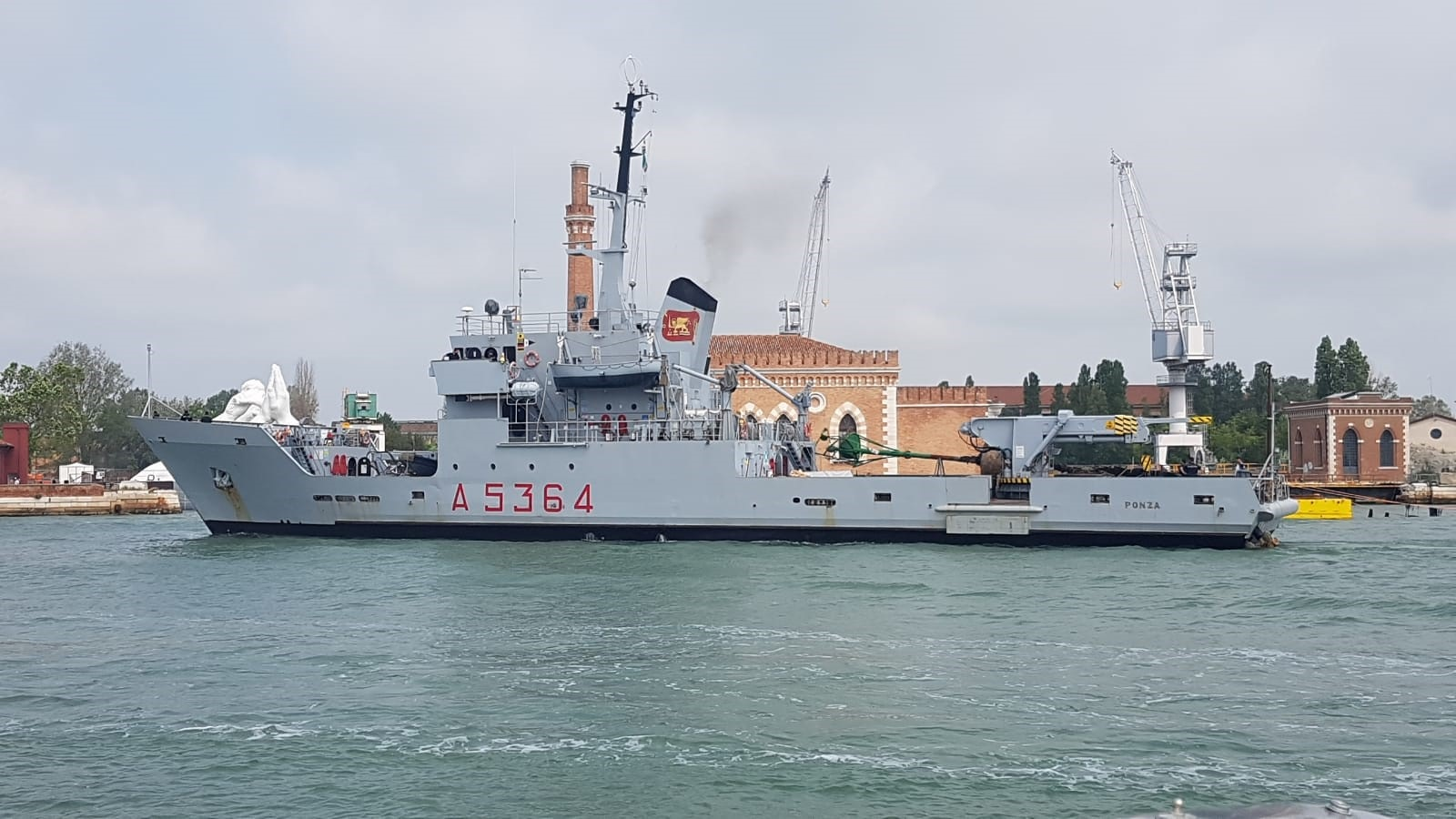
Ponza (A5364) in Venice

Ship Ponza is a unit of type Motion Transport Lighthouses (M.T.F.), which takes the name of the homonymous island of the Pontian Islands in the Tyrrhenian Sea, launched in 1988, in force to the First Group Auxiliary Ships (COMGRUPAUS UNO), was relocated to the First Naval Division (COMDINAV UNO) in 2021.

The vessel is primarily used for activities related to the maintenance and proper functioning of maritime signals necessary to ensure safe navigation in coastal waters. For this reason, the unit is equipped with a crane and a winch capable of lifting respectively up to 15 and 20 tons of weight needed to move the heavy boulders of which the signals themselves are composed.

Ship Ponza, in addition to the activities related to the Lighthouses Campaign, a task for which it was designed in the past, has carried out several operations in favor of the population, such as the transport of humanitarian aid to the Bosnian people in the years 1995 - 1996 and the conduct, concurrently with the civil protection, of the Forest Fire Emergency Campaign in the North East of Sardinia. The unit, moreover, is employed in activities related to the training of future ship commanders, which School of Naval Command and Traineeship of maneuver for officers (Tir.M.Uff.).

Italian Navy - Ponza class
Name	Pennant number	Hull number	Displacement tonnes, f.l.	Laid down	Launched	Commissioned	Initial number	wiki commons
Ponza	A 5364	MTF 229	685	25 March 1987	24 September 1988	9 December 1988	MTF-1304	
Levanzo	A 5366	MTF 230	658,88	25 March 1987	21 June 1989	6 September 1989	MTF-1305	
Tavolara	A 5367	MTF 231	685,59	25 March 1987	28 November 1988	28 February 1989	MTF-1306	
Palmaria	A 5368	MTF 232	685,89	25 March 1987	25 February 1989	19 May 1989	MTF-1307	
Procida	A 5383	MTF 238	584	14 September 1989	23 June 1990	14 November 1990	MTF-1308	
