= Corps of the Port Captaincies – Coast Guard =

Coast guard of Italy

Corps of the Port Captaincies – Coast Guard Corpo delle Capitanerie di porto – Guardia costiera
- Coat of arms of the Italian Coast Guard

- Logo of the Italian Coast Guard
- Motto: Latin: Omnia vincit animus Patience and hard work will conquer all

Agency overview
- Formed: July 20, 1865
- Employees: 11,000

Jurisdictional structure
- Operations jurisdiction: Italy
- Constituting instruments: Constitution of the "Coast Guard", 1989; Royal Decree no. 2438 dated 20 July 1865
- Specialist jurisdiction: Coastal patrol, marine border protection, marine search and rescue

Operational structure
- Headquarters: Roma, viale dell'Arte, 16
- Agency executive: Nicola Carlone, Commandant
- Parent agency: Ministry of Infrastructure and Transport

Notables
- Person: Saint Barbara, Patron
- Anniversary: July 20 - foundation day

Website
- www.guardiacostiera.gov.it

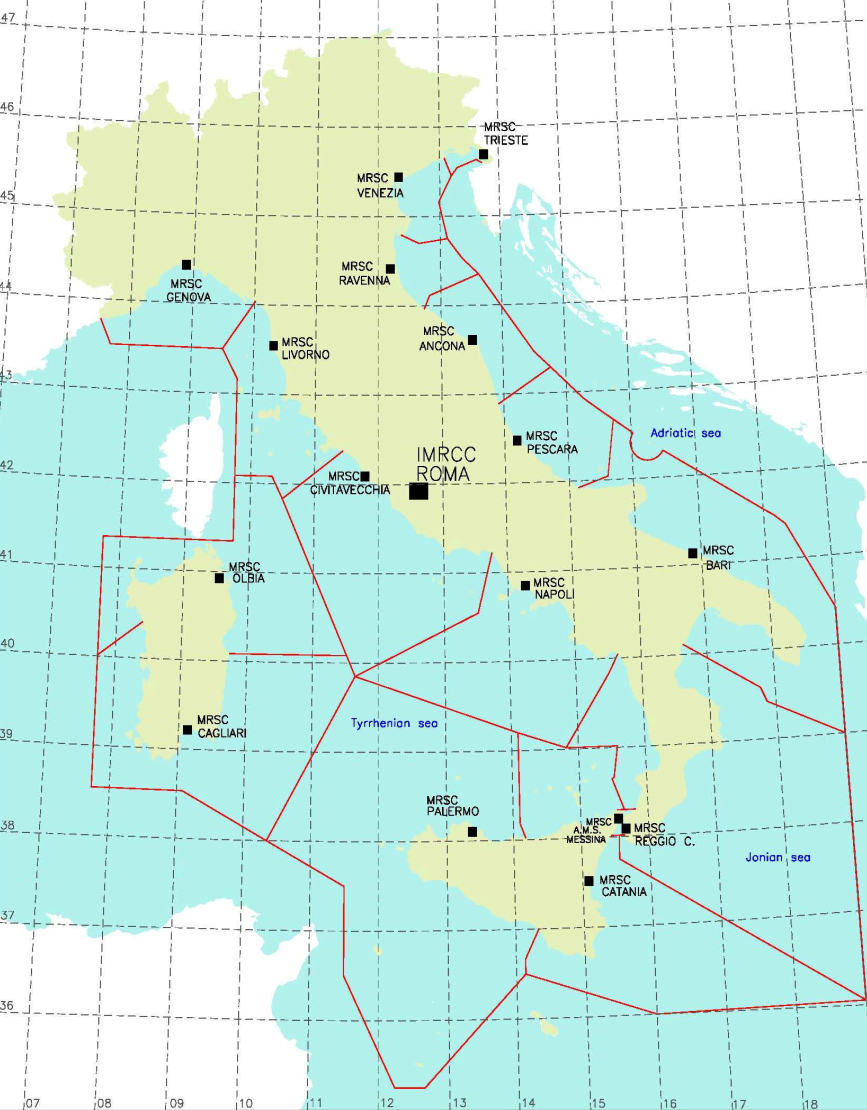
Italian SAR area

The Corps of the Port Captaincies – Coast Guard (Corpo delle Capitanerie di porto – Guardia costiera) is the coast guard of Italy and is part of the Italian Navy under the control of the Ministry of Infrastructure and Transport. Its head office is in Rome.

== Missions ==
The missions of the Italian Coast Guard include:

- Search and rescue
- Maritime law enforcement
- Protection of marine resources
- Safety of navigation
- Fisheries protection and regulation

== History ==
The Italian Coast Guard is the operational SAR branch of the Corpo delle Capitanerie di Porto or Corps of the Port Captaincies, which was organized first by royal decree on 20 July 1865. It was reorganized as part of the Regia Marina of Kingdom of Italy in 1915-1945 (since 1946 as Marina Militare) and on 8 June 1989, redesignated as Guardia costiera.

Coat of arms of the Naval Service of the Italian Coast Guard

Coat of arms of the Air Service of the Italian Coast Guard

Coat of arms of the Italian Coast Guard Headquarters

== Structure and organization ==
=== Structure ===
The Corps of the Port Captaincies – Coast Guard is structured as follows:

- 1 MARICOGECAP – Port Captaincies General Headquarters – Comando generale, which functions of Italian Maritime Rescue Co-ordination Centre (IMRCC)
- 15 DIREZIOMARE – Maritime Directorates – Direzioni marittime, which are at the head of as many Maritime Rescue Sub-Centre Commands (MRSC)
- 55 COMPAMARE – Maritime Departments / Port Captaincies – Compartimenti marittimi / Capitanerie di porto
- 51 CIRCOMARE – Maritime District Offices – Uffici circondariali marittimi
- 126 LOCAMARE – Local Maritime Offices – Uffici locali marittimi
- 61 DELEMARE – Maritime Delegations or Beach Delegations – Delegazioni marittime or Delegazioni di spiaggia

Moreover, the following services are also part of the Corps:

- the air-sea component;
- the Cospas-Sarsat satellite station of Bari (in synergy with the Civil Protection Department);
- the five Underwater Operators Groups (San Benedetto del Tronto, Naples, Messina, Cagliari and Genoa);
- the two Nautical Teams (Lake Garda – Salò; Lake Maggiore – Verbania)
- the Marine Environmental Division of the Port Captaincies by the Ministry for the Environment and Protection of the Territory;
- the group by the General Fishery Direction of the Ministry of Agriculture.

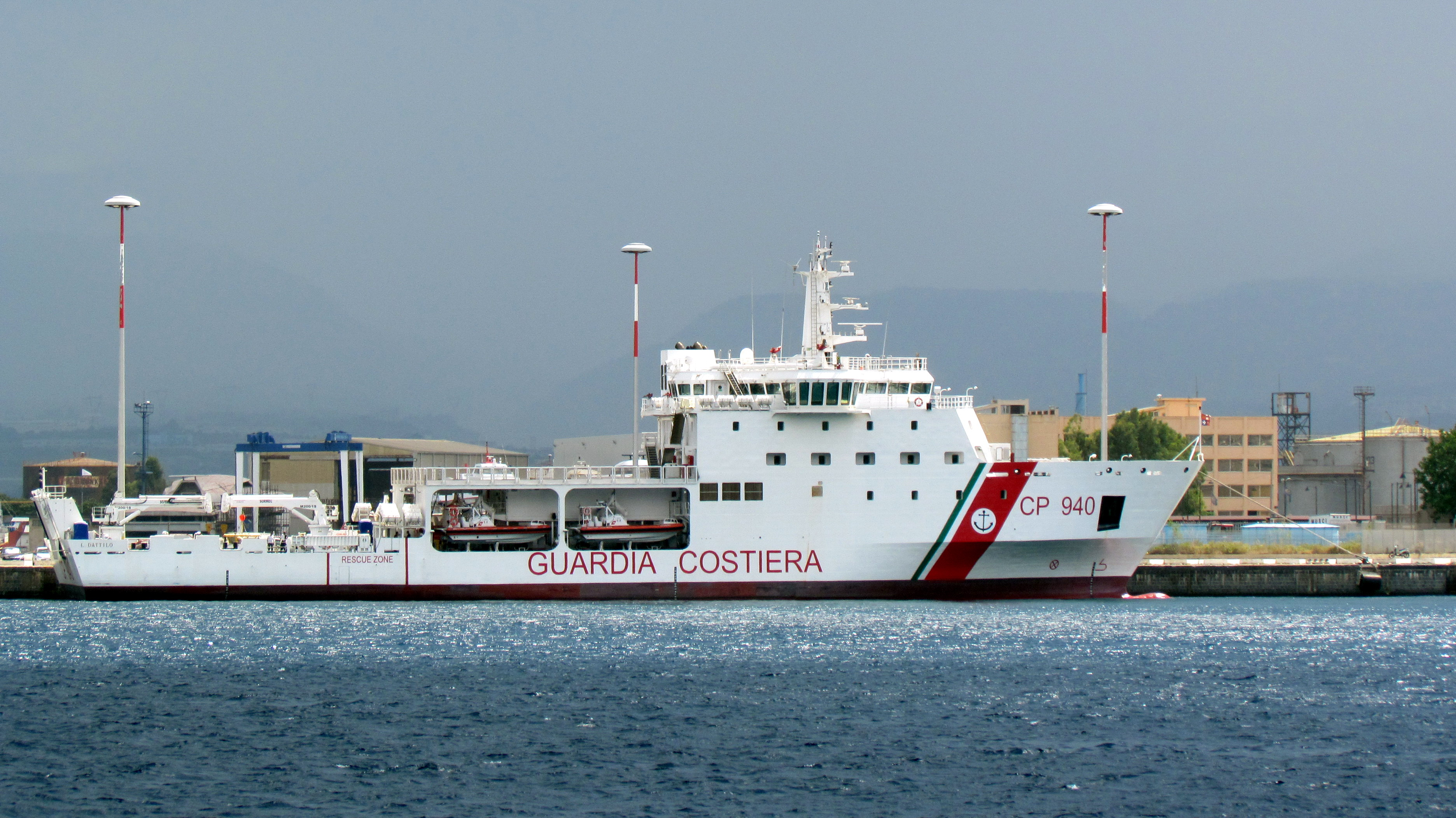
Dattilo-class patrol boat

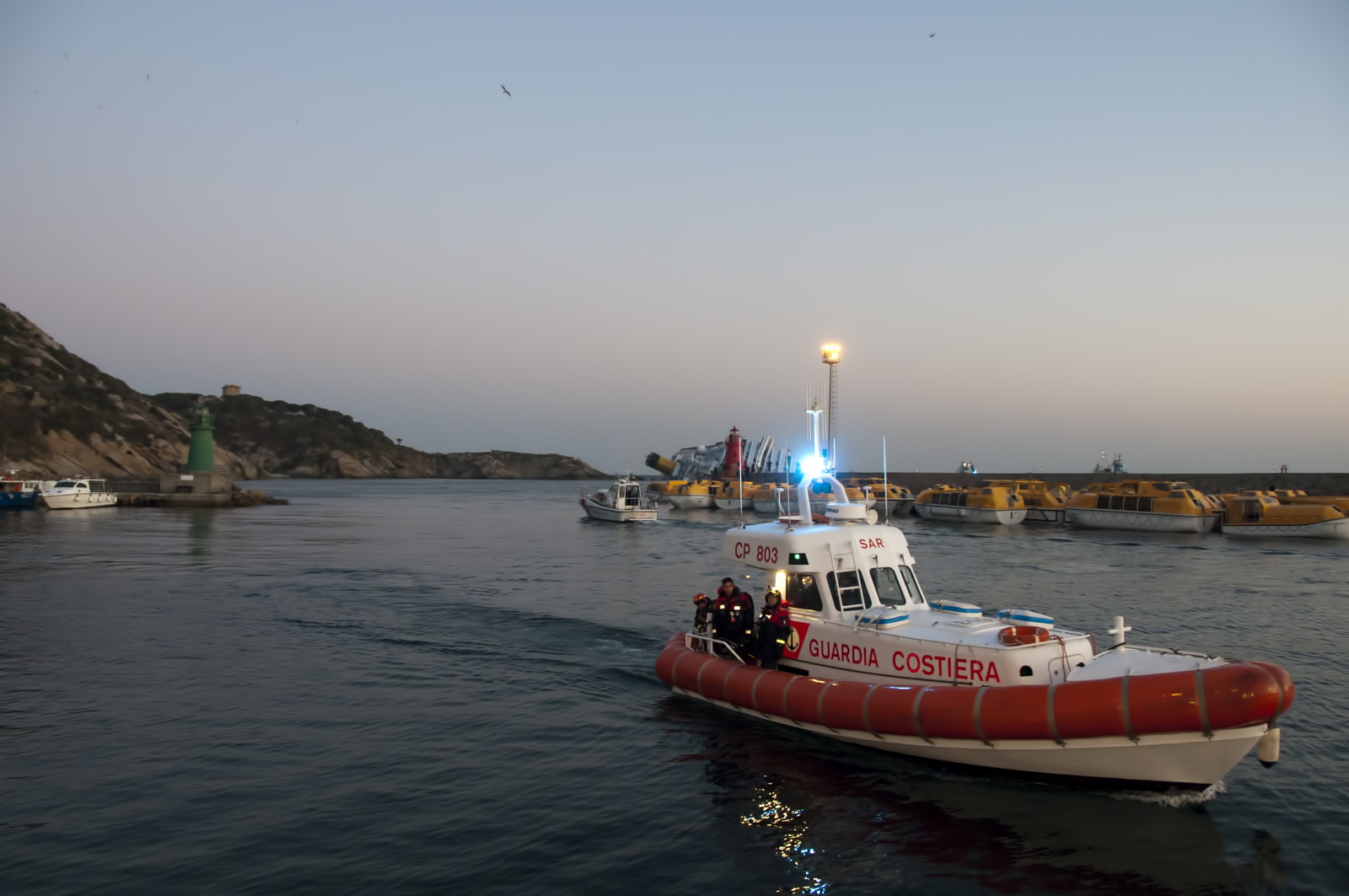
Costa Concordia and Coast Guard

The coast guard also has an air wing.

== Tasks ==
The Corps of the Port Captaincies – Coast Guard is a Corps of the Italian Navy that has tasks and functions connected mostly to the civil use of the sea and with functional dependence of various ministries that avail themselves on their work: first of all the Ministero dei trasporti (Ministry for Transports) which has "inherited" in 1994, from the Ministry of the Merchant Navy, the major part of the functions connected to the use of the sea and the connected activities with the commercial and pleasure navigation an on whose budget weighs the costs for the running of the corps.

The principal tasks of the Corps activities are the following:

- Search and rescue at sea (SAR) with the entire organization of co-ordination, control, detection and communications active for 24 hours a day requested by this activity;
- Safety of navigation, with systematic investigative controls on the entire national mercantile, fishing and pleasure shipping, through the activity of Port State Control, also on the foreign mercantile shipping that calling at the national ports;
- Protection of the marine environment, with functional dependence of the Ministero dell'ambiente e della tutela del territorio (Ministry for the Environment), using for this aim also resources (operations' centers, aeronaval crafts, naval traffic control systems) already used for tasks of rescue, safety of navigation, and maritime police;
- Control on maritime fishery, with functional dependence on the Ministero per le politiche argicole e forestali (Ministry of Agriculture): at this end the general command is the responsible authority of the National Fishing Control Center and the Captaincies carry out the controls prescribed by the national and community norms on the entire fishing fleet;
- Peripheral administration of State functions in the matters of formation of the maritime personnel, of registration of the mercantile and fishing shipping, of pleasure shipping, and of the contentious for those maritime crimes that have been de-penalized;
- Maritime police (namely technical-administrative maritime police), including the discipline of maritime navigation and the regulation of the events that are carried out in the maritime areas that fall under the national sovereignty, the control of the maritime traffic, the manoeuvre of the ships and the safety in the ports, inquiries on the maritime accidents, the control on the maritime State property, the testing and periodic inspections of coastal deposits and other hazardous installations.

Other functions are carried out for the Ministries of defence (enrollment of the military personnel), for Cultural Activities and Treasures (underwater archaeology), of internal affairs (anti-illegal immigration), of Justice and the department of civil protection, all having as a common denominator the sea and navigation. The broadness and the variety of activities carried out present the Corps of the Port Captaincies – Coast Guard as an organism of reference for the maritime activities and make of them a true "sole counter" for the relations with the seafarers. The Corps is represented in a highly specialized structure, as well under the administrative profile as under the technical-operational one, for the completing of the Public functions that are carried out in the maritime spaces of national interest. These spaces include 155 000 km^{2} of maritime waters, internal and territorial, which are in every respect part of the national territory, and other 350 000 km^{2} of waters on which Italy has exclusive rights (exploitation of the depths resources) or duties (rescue in sea and safeguard of the marine environment): a number of marine areas whose extension is almost the double of the entire national territory, which as it is known amounts to 301 000 km^{2}. Following the tendency that is affirming itself in Europe, the maritime authority – coast guard must exercise an effective control in sea for the safeguard of human life, for the safety of navigation, for the correct going on of the economic activities (fishing and exploitation of the continental platform) and for the protection of the marine environment.

The Italian Marine Casualty Investigation Central Board (MCICB Commissione centrale di indagine sui sinistri marittimi, CCISM), a division of the Corps, investigates maritime accidents and incidents. It is not an independent maritime accident investigation unit.

== Insignia ==
Like related coast guards around the world, the Guardia Costiera uses a "racing stripe" on its vessels. This marking is in the national colors, with a narrow green band, a narrow white spacing, and a broad red band. Inside the red band is a white circle with a black anchor. A racing stripe also serves as the logo of the Guardia Costiera.

== Rank insignia ==
NATO code	OF-10	OF-9	OF-8	OF-7	OF-6	OF-5	OF-4	OF-3	OF-2		OF-1
Corps of the Port Captaincies – Coast Guard
Corps of the Port Captaincies – Coast Guard			Ammiraglio ispettore capo (CP) comandante generale	Ammiraglio ispettore (CP)	Contrammiraglio (CP)	Capitano di vascello (CP)	Capitano di fregata (CP)	Capitano di corvetta (CP)	Primo Tenente di vascello (CP)	Tenente di vascello (CP)	Sottotenente di vascello (CP)	Guardiamarina (CP)	Aspirante guardiamarina (CP)

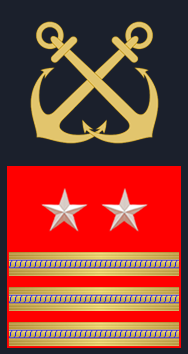
NATO code	OR-9				OR-8		OR-7	OR-6	OR-5	OR-4				OR-3	OR-2	OR-1
Corps of the Port Captaincies – Coast Guard
Corps of the Port Captaincies – Coast Guard	Primo luogotenente (q.s.) Np.	Luogotenente Np.	Primo Maresciallo Np.	Capo di Prima Classe Np.	Capo di Seconda Classe Np.	Capo di Terza Classe Np.	Secondo Capo Scelto Np.	Secondo Capo Np.	Sergente Np.	Sottocapo di Prima Classe Scelto Np.	Sottocapo di Prima Classe Np.	Sottocapo di Seconda Classe Np.	Sottocapo di Terza Classe Np.	Comune scielto	Comune di Prima Classe Np.	Comune di Seconda Classe Np.

== See also ==
- Italian Coast Guard Air Service
- List of Italian Coast Guard vessels
