= Italian ship Marcantonio Colonna =

Marcantonio Colonna was the name of at least three ships of the Italian Navy named in honour of Marcantonio Colonna and may refer to:

- Italian battleship Marcantonio Colonna, a Caracciolo-class battleship laid down in 1915 but broken up on the slip in 1921..
- Italian submarine Marcantonio Colonna, a Pisani-class submarine launched in 1927 and broken up in 1943.
- Italian offshore patrol vessel Marcantonio Colonna, a Thaon di Revel-class offshore patrol vessel, laid down in 2020, launched in 2022. Sold to the Indonesian Navy in 2024 and renamed as KRI Brawijaya in 2025.
