= KRI Sriwijaya =

Indonesian aircraft carrier

- KRI Sriwijaya in Tanjung Priok, September 2026

History

Italy
- Name: Giuseppe Garibaldi
- Namesake: Giuseppe Garibaldi
- Builder: Fincantieri, Monfalcone Shipyard, Monfalcone (Gorizia)
- Laid down: 26 March 1981
- Launched: 11 June 1983
- Commissioned: 30 September 1985
- Decommissioned: 1 October 2024
- Home port: Taranto
- Identification: Pennant number: 551
- Motto: Obbedisco ("I Obey")
- Fate: Transferred to the Indonesian Navy

Indonesia
- Name: KRI Sriwijaya
- Namesake: Srivijaya
- Acquired: 20 July 2026
- Commissioned: 24 September 2026
- Home port: Ratai Bay, Lampung
- Identification: Pennant number: 100
- Motto: Manggala Nusantara Jaya
- Status: In service
- Badge

General characteristics as Giuseppe Garibaldi
- Type: Aircraft carrier
- Displacement: - 10,100 t (9,900 long tons) (standard); - 13,850 t (13,630 long tons) (full load); - 14,150 t (13,930 long tons) (full load, after 2003 MLU)
- Length: 180.2 m (591 ft)
- Beam: 33.4 m (110 ft)
- Draught: 8.2 m (27 ft)
- Propulsion: - 4 × General Electric/Avio LM2500 gas turbines, 60,400 kW (81,000 hp); - 6 × diesel engine generators Grandi Motori Trieste B230/12, 9,360 kW (12,550 hp) with electric generator Ansaldo-Elettrital, 1,560 kW (2,090 hp) each
- Speed: 30 kn (56 km/h; 35 mph)+
- Range: 7,000 nmi (13,000 km; 8,100 mi) at 20 kn (37 km/h; 23 mph)
- Complement: - 830, of which: 550 Crew; up to 180 for Naval Aviation; up to 100 C^{4} staff
- Sensors & processing systems: - Selenia MM/SPS-768 (RAN 3L) long-range radar; - Selenia SPS-774 (RAN-10S) early warning radar; - Hughes AN/SPS-52C early warning, E band radar; - Selenia SPS-702 CORA surface search radar; - 2 × GEM Elettronica SPN-749 navigation radar; - Selenia SPN-728 approach radar; - 3 × Selenia RTN-30X fire control radar, for Albatross/Aspide; - 3 × Selenia RTN-20X fire control radar, for CIWS 40/70 mm; - Raytheon DE 1160 LF hull sonar (replaced by WASS DMS-2000 in 2003); - Selenia CMS SADOC-3; - TACAN Face Standard URN-25
- Electronic warfare & decoys: - Elettronica Spa SLQ-732 jamming system; - 2 × OTO Melara SCLAR decoy launcher; - AN/SLQ-25 Nixie towed torpedo decoy
- Armament: 2 × Mk.29 octuple launcher for Sea Sparrow/Selenia Aspide SAM; 3 × Oto Melara Twin 40L70 DARDO gun-based CIWS; 2 × 324 mm triple torpedo tubes
- Aircraft carried: up to 18 aircraft including: Eurocopter AS565 MBe Panther anti-submarine warfare (ASW) and utility helicopters; Sikorsky S-70 transport and utility helicopters; Bayraktar TB3 unmanned combat aerial vehicle (future)
- Notes: flight deck is 174.0 m (570.9 ft) long and 30.0 m (98.4 ft) wide

KRI Sriwijaya (100) is a light aircraft carrier of the Indonesian Navy. It is Indonesia's first aircraft carrier. Originally built as Giuseppe Garibaldi and commissioned in 1985, she served in the Italian Navy for 39 years before being retired in 2024. She was acquired by Indonesia in 2026 and is planned to receive a modernization upgrade. She is intended to serve as a drone carrier and helicopter carrier. The aircraft carrier is named after the empire of Srivijaya.

== History ==
=== Acquisition ===
It was reported in March 2025 that the Indonesian Navy was interested in acquiring the former Giuseppe Garibaldi from Italy, along with her air wing of Harrier II jets. Fincantieri presented a proposal to the Indonesian Navy in July 2025 to convert the ship into a helicopter and UAV assault ship. In September 2025, the Chief of Staff of the Indonesian Navy Admiral Muhammad Ali stated that the acquisition of Giuseppe Garibaldi is still being discussed with the Italian side. In late August 2025, the Indonesian government approved loan plans of up to US$450 million to acquire the ship and its supporting equipment. The government also approved US$250 million loan for transport helicopters and US$300 million loan for utility helicopters procurements, which likely will operate from the aircraft carrier.

As of 17 February 2026, negotiations remained ongoing between the Indonesian and Italian navies and Fincantieri, with the ship set to be transferred as a grant. On 10 March, a Senate Foreign Affairs and Defence Committee (Commissione Affari esteri e difesa del Senato) vote for the transfer of Giuseppe Garibaldi was delayed by the opposition Five Star Movement (M5S) and Democratic Party (PD). M5S members also asked if the ship could be sold rather than gifted for free to the Indonesian Navy. On 24 March, speaking in front of the committee, Admiral Giacinto Ottaviani said that maintenance and scrapping costs made the transfer of the ship for free the "most convenient solution" (soluzione più conveniente). The draft decree for a vote was approved by the Committee the same day, and forwarded to the Committees of the Chamber (Commissioni competenti della Camera).

Representatives of M5S, PD and Italia Viva (IV) indicated that their parties would vote to oppose the transfer, while Brothers of Italy (FdI) and Lega (LSP) representatives expressed a favourable opinion. On 28 April 2026, the transfer was approved.

Indonesian Naval Aviation has begun training for carrier flight operations in May 2026 using a mock outline of flight deck at the Juanda Naval Air Station in Surabaya. Later in August 2026, helicopter pilots of the Indonesian Army and the Air Force also started practicing shipboard operation. The Indonesian military envisioned that all three branches of the Armed Forces to be able to operate from the carrier. Indonesian Navy chief stated in June 2026 that several names are proposed for the aircraft carrier, among them are Gajah Mada and Panglima Sudirman. The Indonesian Navy also sent advance party of 100 personnel on 10 July 2026 to receive training and operate the vessel. The ship has been delivered with a mix of Indonesian and Italian crew. In June 2026, Indonesian Navy announced that Lampung Naval Base in Pesawaran Regency, Lampung will be the homeport of the ship.

On 20 July, at a meeting of the First Commission of the House of Representatives of Indonesia, Air Vice Marshal Haris Haryanto, the director general of defense power of the Ministry of Defense, confirmed that the former Giuseppe Garibaldi is expected to arrive in Indonesia on 20 September 2026. The Indonesian House of Representatives also approved the transfer of the aircraft carrier in an open parliamentary forum. The decision was made after the Ministry of Defense requested approval for transfer of the ship to Indonesia at a cost of €54 million. The forum explained that the construction of the Ratai Bay Naval Base in Lampung had reached 76% and is expected to be completed before the ship's arrival and its inauguration at the Indonesian National Armed Forces Anniversary on 5 October 2026.

The former Giuseppe Garibaldi departed Taranto for Indonesia on the evening of 24 August 2026. The Chief of Staff of the Indonesian Navy Admiral Muhammad Ali stated that the ship will be renamed as KRI Gajah Mada once it arrived in Indonesia. She was planned to arrive in Indonesia on 15–20 September and to be commissioned on 25 September. The ship would pass through Suez Canal and the Red Sea and is planned to make port calls in Jeddah, Saudi Arabia and Colombo, Sri Lanka. The vessel is also escorted by several Italian frigates during the journey. The ship made port calls in Safaga, Egypt on 29 August and Colombo on 9–12 September.

Future KRI Sriwijaya, escorted by Brawijaya (background), arriving in Indonesia on 18 September 2026

Republika reported on 11 September that the former Giuseppe Garibaldi will be renamed as KRI Sriwijaya instead of KRI Gajah Mada as was previously stated. The Indonesian Navy responded that as of 14 September, the ship's future name is under administrational review process. The Indonesian Navy Fleet Command stated on their press release on 17 September that the ship will be named Sriwijaya.

The aircraft carrier entered Indonesian territorial waters on 17 September and was escorted by frigates KRI Brawijaya and Prabu Siliwangi. The vessel arrived in Port of Tanjung Priok, Jakarta on 18 September. The ship was repainted starting on 22 September in preparation for its commissioning.

=== Service history ===
The aircraft carrier was reflagged and formally commissioned into the Indonesian Navy as KRI Sriwijaya (pennant number 100) on 24 September 2026. 400 crew members, including the ship's first commanding officer Colonel Mochamad Fuad Hasan, was also inaugurated that day.
