= Italian ship Raimondo Montecuccoli =

Raimondo Montecuccoli has been the name of at least two ships of the Italian Navy, named in honour of Raimondo Montecuccoli:

- Italian cruiser Raimondo Montecuccoli, a Condottieri-class cruiser launched in 1934 and stricken in 1964
- Italian offshore patrol vessel Raimondo Montecuccoli, a Thaon di Revel-class offshore patrol vessel launched in 2020
