= Italian ship Giovanni delle Bande Nere =

Giovanni delle Bande Nere has been the name of at least two ships of the Italian Navy, named in honour of Giovanni delle Bande Nere:

- Italian cruiser Giovanni delle Bande Nere, a Giussano-class cruiser launched in 1930
- Italian offshore patrol vessel Giovanni delle Bande Nere, a Thaon di Revel-class offshore patrol vessel launched in 2022
