= Sumarji Bimoaji =

Indonesian Navy admiral

Commander of 13th Naval Regional Command
- Incumbent
- Assumed office December 2025
- Preceded by: Phundi Rusbandi

Special Staff to the Chief of Staff of the Indonesian Navy
- In office 24 July 2024 – December 2025

Commander of the Maritime Security Task Force of the 3rd Fleet Command
- In office 27 September 2023 – 24 July 2024
- Preceded by: Tunggul

Personal details
- Born: 22 October 1975 (age 51) Ujung Pandang, South Sulawesi, Indonesia
- Citizenship: Indonesian
- Spouse: Alvita Bimoaji
- Education: Indonesian Naval Academy (1998)
- Awards: Adhi Makayasa (1998)

Military service
- Allegiance: Indonesia
- Branch/service: (Indonesia) Indonesian Navy
- Rank: Rear admiral

Sumarji Bimoaji (born 22 October 1975) is an Indonesian Navy rear admiral who has served as Commander of the 13th Naval Regional Command (Dankodaeral XIII) in Tarakan since December 2025.

== Early life and education ==
Sumarji was born in Ujung Pandang (now Makassar), South Sulawesi, on 22 October 1975. He graduated from the 44th class of the Indonesian Naval Academy (Seaman Corps) in 1998 as the top graduate and received the Adhi Makayasa award.

== Military career ==
During his career in the surface fleet, Sumarji commanded several Indonesian Navy warships: KRI Hiu-364 (2013), KRI Singa-651 (2014), KRI Keris-624 (2015), KRI Sultan Iskandar Muda (367) (2017), KRI Abdul Halim Perdanakusuma (355) (2019), and KRI I Gusti Ngurah Rai (332) (2020).

He later held staff and unit command posts in the 2nd Fleet Command (Koarmada II), serving as Commander of the Fast Patrol Boat Unit, Commander of the Escort Ship Unit, and Assistant for Operations to the Fleet Commander. On 27 September 2023, he was promoted to first admiral and appointed Commander of the Maritime Security Task Force (Guskamla) of the 3rd Fleet Command. In early 2024, he commanded the Port Visit Egypt Task Force aboard the hospital ship KRI dr. Radjiman Wedyodiningrat (992), which delivered 242 tons of Indonesian humanitarian aid for Gaza through El-Arish Port in Egypt.

On 24 July 2024, Sumarji became Special Staff to the Chief of Staff of the Indonesian Navy and was assigned to lead the procurement task force for two Thaon di Revel-class frigates, KRI Brawijaya (320) and KRI Prabu Siliwangi (321), built by Fincantieri in Italy. Following Indonesian National Armed Forces Commander Decree No. Kep/1664/XII/2025 in December 2025, he was appointed Commander of the 13th Naval Regional Command in Tarakan, North Kalimantan, succeeding Phundi Rusbandi, and was promoted to rear admiral in March 2026.
