= Morosini =

Morosini is an Italian surname. Notable people with the surname include:

- Morosini family
- Piermario Morosini (1986–2012), Italian footballer
- Sergio Rossetti Morosini (born 1953), New York author, painter, sculptor and independent filmmaker

== See also ==
- Italian ship Francesco Morosini
