= Italian ship Francesco Morosini =

Francesco Morosini or simply Morosini has been the name of at least five ships of the Italian Navy, named in honour of Francesco Morosini:

- Italian ironclad Francesco Morosini, an ironclad battleship completed in 1889 and stricken in 1909
- Italian battleship Francesco Morosini, a Francesco Caracciolo-class battleship laid down in 1915 and broken up on slip in 1921.
- Italian submarine Morosini, a Marcello-class submarine launched in 1938 and sunk in 1942.
- Italian submarine Francesco Morosini (S 508), a Balao-class submarine launched in 1944 as USS Besugo. Loaned to Italy between 1966 and 1975 after which she was returned to the United States Navy.
- Italian offshore patrol vessel Francesco Morosini, a Thaon di Revel-class offshore patrol vessel launched in 2020
