= Italian offshore patrol vessel Giovanni delle Bande Nere =

Thaon di Revel-class offshore patrol vessel

History

Italy
- Name: Giovanni delle Bande Nere
- Namesake: Giovanni delle Bande Nere
- Ordered: 2014
- Builder: Fincantieri, Muggiano
- Cost: €3.9 billion
- Laid down: 28 August 2019
- Launched: 12 February 2022
- Commissioned: 2 October 2024
- Identification: Pennant number: P434
- Status: Active

General characteristics
- Class & type: Thaon di Revel-class offshore patrol vessel
- Displacement: light displacement: 4,994 t (4,915 long tons); full displacement: 6,270 t (6,170 long tons)
- Length: 143 m (469 ft 2 in) LOA; 133 m (436 ft 4 in) LPP
- Beam: 16.5 m (54 ft 2 in)
- Draught: 10.5 m (34 ft 5 in)
- Depth: 5 m (16 ft 5 in)
- Propulsion: CODAG CC scheme; 1 × TAG General Electric/Avio LM2500+G4, 32,000 kW (43,000 hp); 2 × diesel engines MTU 20V 8000 M91L, 10,000 kW (13,000 hp) each; 4 x diesel engine generators MAN GenSets 12V175D-MEM 1,640 kW (2,200 hp); 2 × electric engines, 1,350 kW (1,810 hp) each (reversible); 2 x diesel engine emergency generators; 1 × thruster, 550 kW (740 hp); 2 × shafts, driving controllable pitch propellers
- Speed: 27 knots (50 km/h; 31 mph) only on TAG; 25 knots (46 km/h; 29 mph) only on 2 main diesel engines; 18 knots (33 km/h; 21 mph) only on 1 main diesel engine; 10 knots (19 km/h; 12 mph) on electric-diesel engine
- Range: 5,000 nmi (9,300 km; 5,800 mi) at 15 knots (28 km/h; 17 mph)
- Complement: 173 beds (+ 30 on modular rear zone)
- Crew: PPA Full 120 crew; PPA Light+ + 90; PPA Light 90; (add 24 crew for two helos on board and other 89/59 beds for optional boarding team, marines team, maritime command staffs, etc.)
- Sensors & processing systems: Leonardo-Finmeccanica naval cockpit; Leonardo-Finmeccanica SADOC Mk4 CMS (Command Management System) with 28 MFC (20 on PPA Light version); Leonardo-Finmeccanica SAAM-ESD, AAW system; 1 x Leonardo-Finmeccanica LPI air and ground surveillance radar (SPS-732); 2 x Leonardo-Finmeccanica navigation radar, X/Ka dual band radar; 1 x Leonardo-Finmeccanica static IRST (InfraRed Search and Track); 1 x Leonardo-Finmeccanica next generation IFF sensors (Identification Friend & Foe) with circular antenna; 1 x Leonardo-Finmeccanica Diver Detection Sonar; 1 x Leonardo-Finmeccanica Fire Control System, ADT NG NA-30S Mk2; 1 x dual-band SATCOM antenna; 1 x tri-band SATCOM antenna; 1 x SAT-TV antenna; 1 x Leonardo-Finmeccanica AESA 3D Dual Band Radar, C and X-band radar; 1 x Leonardo-Finmeccanica ATAS (Active Towed Array Sonar), VDS sonar; 1 x Leonardo-Finmeccanica Black Snake, anti torpedo towed array sonar; 1 x Leonardo-Finmeccanica Underwater Telephone; 1 x Leonardo-Finmeccanica Bathy Thermograph Unit
- Electronic warfare & decoys: Elettronica-ELT Spa ZEUS System; RESM (Radar Electronic Support Counter-Measure); RECM (Radar Electronic Counter-Measure); CESM (Communication ESM); 2 x Oto Melara ODLS-20 decoy launchers
- Armament: 1 × Oto Melara 127 mm/64 Vulcano with Automated Ammunition Handling System (AAHS); 1 × Oto Melara 76 mm/62 Strales Sovraponte anti-aircraft gun; 2 × Oto Melara Oerlikon KBA B06, remote mounting; 2 x 8-cell DCNS SYLVER A70 VLS for 16 Aster 15, 30 or 30B1NT or Scalp Naval; 8 × Teseo\Otomat Mk-2/E anti-ship and land attack missiles; 2 x triple WASSB-515/3 launcher for Black Arrow 324 mm torpedoes
- Aircraft carried: 2 × SH90; 1 × AW101
- Aviation facilities: - double hangar; - flight deck 25.5 m × 16.5 m (83 ft 8 in × 54 ft 2 in)

Giovanni delle Bande Nere (P434) is the fourth ship of the Thaon di Revel-class offshore patrol vessels built for the Italian Navy.

== Development and design ==
The ship is the first full capability variant of the PPA design. Its armament will include 16 Aster 15 and Aster 30 surface-to-air missiles, Teseo anti-ship missiles, two triple launchers for MU90 torpedoes, a 127 mm and 76mm turret and two remotely operated 25 mm mounts. Sensors include an ATAS towed sonar for anti-submarine warfare and a Black Snake antenna for torpedo detection, as well as ODLS 20 decoy launchers with anti-missile and anti-torpedo countermeasures. Like other PPAs, the main radar is a Leonardo Kronos with four fixed panels.

The Italian Navy ordered the new MBDA TESEO MK/2E heavy-duty missile (TESEO "EVO"), a long-range anti-ship missilewith also strategic land attack capability. The missile will have a new terminal "head" with dual RF seeker (Radio Frequency) and, presumably, given the need to even attack ground targets, IIR (Imaging IR). Compared to the predecessor OTOMAT/TESEO, the TESEO "EVO" MK/2E has a double range or more than 360 km. Former OTOMAT is accredited for a range of action of more than 180 km.

== Construction and career ==
Giovanni delle Bande Nere was laid down on 28 August 2019 at Fincantieri Muggiano and was launched on 12 February 2022. The ship was reported on sea trials as of August 2022. It was commissioned on 2 October 2024.
