= Italian offshore patrol vessel Paolo Thaon di Revel =

Thaon di Revel-class offshore patrol vessel

History

Italy
- Name: Paolo Thaon di Revel
- Namesake: Paolo Thaon di Revel
- Ordered: 2014
- Builder: Fincantieri, Muggiano
- Cost: €3.9 billion for 7 units, including 10 years logistic support
- Laid down: 9 May 2017
- Launched: 15 June 2019
- Commissioned: 18 March 2022
- Identification: Pennant number: P430
- Status: Active

General characteristics
- Class & type: Thaon di Revel-class offshore patrol vessel
- Displacement: light displacement: 4,880 t (4,800 long tons); full displacement: 5,830 t (5,740 long tons)
- Length: 143 m (469 ft 2 in) LOA; 133 m (436 ft 4 in) LPP
- Beam: 16.5 m (54 ft 2 in)
- Draught: 10.5 m (34 ft 5 in)
- Depth: 5 m (16 ft 5 in)
- Propulsion: CODAG CC scheme; 1 × TAG General Electric/Avio LM2500+G4, 32,000 kW (43,000 hp); 2 × diesel engines MTU 20V 8000 M91L, 10,000 kW (13,000 hp) each; 4 x diesel engine generators MAN GenSets 12V175D-MEM 1,640 kW (2,200 hp); 2 × electric engines, 1,350 kW (1,810 hp) each (reversible); 2 x diesel engine emergency generators; 1 × thruster, 550 kW (740 hp); 2 × shafts, driving controllable pitch propellers
- Speed: 32 knots (59 km/h; 37 mph) in CODAG; 27 knots (50 km/h; 31 mph) only on TAG; 25 knots (46 km/h; 29 mph) only on 2 main diesel engines; 18 knots (33 km/h; 21 mph) only on 1 main diesel engine; 10 knots (19 km/h; 12 mph) on electric-diesel engine
- Range: 5,000 nmi (9,300 km; 5,800 mi) at 15 knots (28 km/h; 17 mph)
- Complement: 173 beds (+ 30 on modular rear zone)
- Crew: PPA Light 90;(add 24 crew for two helos on board and other 89/59 beds for optional boarding team, marines team, maritime command staffs, etc.)
- Sensors & processing systems: Leonardo-Finmeccanica naval cockpit; Leonardo-Finmeccanica SADOC Mk4 CMS (Command Management System) with 28 MFC (20 on PPA Light version); Leonardo-Finmeccanica SAAM-ESD, AAW system; 1 x Leonardo-Finmeccanica LPI air and ground surveillance radar (SPS-732); 2 x Leonardo-Finmeccanica navigation radar, X/Ka dual band radar; 1 x Leonardo-Finmeccanica static IRST (InfraRed Search and Track); 1 x Leonardo-Finmeccanica next generation IFF sensors (Identification Friend & Foe) with circular antenna; 1 x Leonardo-Finmeccanica Diver Detection Sonar; 1 x Leonardo-Finmeccanica Fire Control System, ADT NG NA30S Mk2; 1 x dual-band SATCOM antenna; 1 x tri-band SATCOM antenna; 1 x SAT-TV antenna; 1 x Leonardo-Finmeccanica AESA 3D Dual Band Radar, only X-band radar
- Electronic warfare & decoys: Elettronica-ELT Spa ZEUS System; RESM (Radar Electronic Support Counter-Measure); RECM (Radar Electronic Counter-Measure); CESM (Communication ESM); 2 x Long Range Acoustic Device (Long Range Acoustic System) SITEP MS-424; FFBNW 2 x Oto Melara ODLS-20 decoy launchers
- Armament: 1 × Oto Melara 127 mm/64 Vulcano with Automated Ammunition Handling System (AAHS); 1 × Oto Melara 76 mm/62 Strales Sovraponte anti-aircraft gun; 2 × Oto Melara Oerlikon KBA B06, remote mounting
- Aircraft carried: 2 × SH90; 1 × AW101
- Aviation facilities: - double hangar; - flight deck 25.5 m × 16.5 m (83 ft 8 in × 54 ft 2 in)

Paolo Thaon di Revel (P430) is the lead ship of the Thaon di Revel-class offshore patrol vessels.

== Development and design ==
The ships were designed as a "multipurpose offshore patrol vessel". The first seven vessels are built with different configurations: a basic "light" variant for the patrol task, an enhanced configuration with better self-defence capacity and a "full" variant incorporating a much broader capability. Paolo Thaon di Revel, as the lead ship of the class, is built in the "light" configuration.

The Italian Navy ordered the new MBDA TESEO MK/2E heavy-duty missile (TESEO "EVO"), a long-range anti-ship missile with also strategic land attack capability. The missile will have a new terminal "head" with dual RF seeker (Radio Frequency) and, presumably, date the need to even attack ground targets, IIR (Imaging IR). Compared to the predecessor OTOMAT/TESEO, the TESEO "EVO" MK/2E has a double range or more than 360 km. Former OTOMAT is accredited for a range of action of more than 180 km.

== Construction and career ==
Paolo Thaon di Revel was laid down on 9 May 2017 at Fincantieri Muggiano and launched on 15 June 2019. Expected to be commissioned in May 2021. 15 November 2019, she underwent her first sea trial off the Gulf of La Spezia. The vessel was delivered to the Italian Navy on 18 March 2022.

In August 2022, the ship, with one SH-90A helicopter embarked, operates as flagship of Operation AGENOR, the military pillar of the European-Led Maritime Awareness in the Strait of Hormuz (EMASoH), being deployed in the Gulf region, Strait of Hormuz, and the Gulf of Oman, to promote the safe passage of merchant shipping in the region.
