= Italian offshore patrol vessel Francesco Morosini =

Thaon di Revel-class offshore patrol vessel

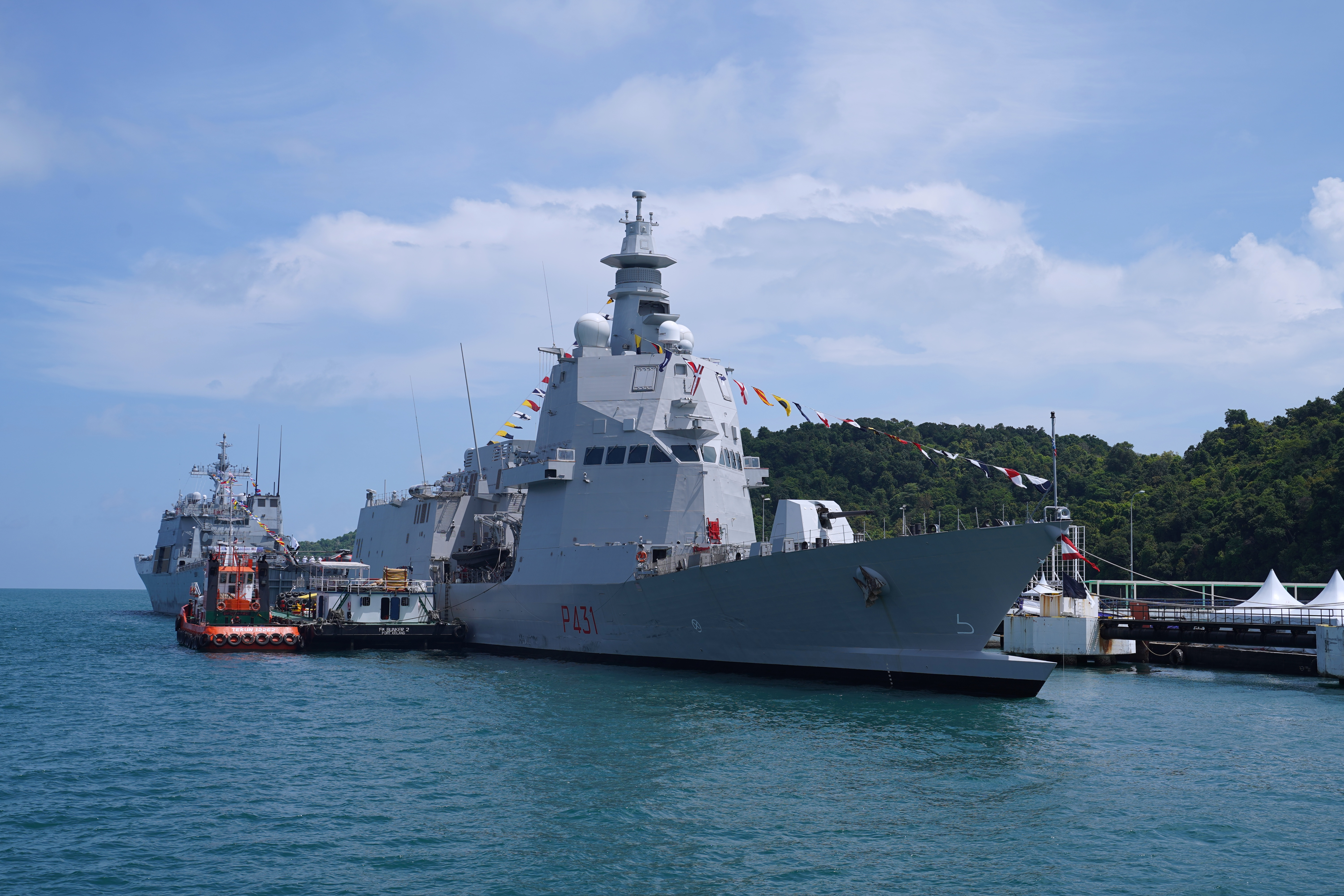
- Francesco Morosini at Langkawi International Maritime and Aerospace Exhibition (LIMA) 2023 in Malaysia.

History

Italy
- Name: Francesco Morosini
- Namesake: Francesco Morosini
- Ordered: 2014
- Builder: Fincantieri, Muggiano
- Cost: €3.9 billion for 7 ships (unit cost depending on configuration)
- Laid down: 16 February 2018
- Launched: 22 May 2020
- Commissioned: 22 October 2022
- Identification: Pennant number: P431
- Status: Active

General characteristics
- Class & type: Thaon di Revel-class offshore patrol vessel
- Displacement: light displacement: 4,880 t (4,800 long tons); full displacement: 5,830 t (5,740 long tons)
- Length: 143 m (469 ft 2 in) LOA; 133 m (436 ft 4 in) LPP
- Beam: 16.5 m (54 ft 2 in)
- Draught: 10.5 m (34 ft 5 in)
- Depth: 5 m (16 ft 5 in)
- Propulsion: CODAG CC scheme; 1 × TAG General Electric/Avio LM2500+G4, 32,000 kW (43,000 hp); 2 × diesel engines MTU 20V 8000 M91L, 10,000 kW (13,000 hp) each; 4 x diesel engine generators MAN GenSets 12V175D-MEM 1,640 kW (2,200 hp); 2 × electric engines, 1,350 kW (1,810 hp) each (reversible); 2 x diesel engine emergency generators; 1 × thruster, 550 kW (740 hp); 2 × shafts, driving controllable pitch propellers
- Speed: 27 knots (50 km/h; 31 mph) only on TAG; 25 knots (46 km/h; 29 mph) only on 2 main diesel engines; 18 knots (33 km/h; 21 mph) only on 1 main diesel engine; 10 knots (19 km/h; 12 mph) on electric-diesel engine
- Range: 5,000 nmi (9,300 km; 5,800 mi) at 15 knots (28 km/h; 17 mph)
- Complement: 173 beds (+ 30 on modular rear zone)
- Crew: PPA Full 120 crew;PPA Light+ + 90;PPA Light 90;( add 24 crew for two helos on board and other 89/59 beds for optional boarding team, marines team, maritime command staffs, etc.)
- Sensors & processing systems: Leonardo-Finmeccanica naval cockpit; Leonardo-Finmeccanica SADOC Mk4 CMS (Command Management System) with 28 MFC (20 on PPA Light version); Leonardo-Finmeccanica SAAM-ESD, AAW system; 1 x Leonardo-Finmeccanica LPI air and ground surveillance radar (SPS-732); 2 x Leonardo-Finmeccanica navigation radar, X/Ka dual band radar; 1 x Leonardo-Finmeccanica static IRST (InfraRed Search and Track); 1 x Leonardo-Finmeccanica next generation IFF sensors (Identification Friend & Foe) with circular antenna; 1 x Leonardo-Finmeccanica Diver Detection Sonar; 1 x Leonardo-Finmeccanica Fire Control System, ADT NG NA-30S Mk2; 1 x dual-band SATCOM antenna; 1 x tri-band SATCOM antenna; 1 x SAT-TV antenna; 1 x Leonardo-Finmeccanica AESA 3D Dual Band Radar, only X-band radar
- Electronic warfare & decoys: Elettronica-ELT Spa ZEUS System; RESM (Radar Electronic Support Counter-Measure); RECM (Radar Electronic Counter-Measure); CESM (Communication ESM); 2 x Long Range Acoustic Device (Long Range Acoustic System) SITEP MS-424; FFBNW 2 x Oto Melara ODLS-20 decoy launchers
- Armament: 1 × Oto Melara 127 mm/64 Vulcano with Automated Ammunition Handling System (AAHS); 1 × Oto Melara 76 mm/62 Strales Sovraponte anti-aircraft gun; 2 × Oto Melara Oerlikon KBA B06, remote mounting
- Aircraft carried: 2 × SH90; 1 × AW101
- Aviation facilities: - double hangar; - flight deck 25.5 m × 16.5 m (83 ft 8 in × 54 ft 2 in)

Francesco Morosini (P431) is the second ship of the Thaon di Revel-class offshore patrol vessels.

== Development and design ==
The Italian Navy ordered the new MBDA TESEO MK/2E heavy-duty missile (TESEO "EVO"), a long-range anti-ship missile with also strategic land attack capability. The missile will have a new terminal "head" with dual RF seeker (Radio Frequency) and, presumably, date the need to even attack ground targets, IIR (Imaging IR). Compared to the predecessor OTOMAT/TESEO, the TESEO "EVO" MK/2E has a double range or more than 360 km. Former OTOMAT is accredited for a range of action of more than 180 km.

== Construction and career ==
Francesco Morosini was laid down on 16 February 2018 at Fincantieri Muggiano and launched on 22 May 2020. The ship had been expected to be commissioned in March 2022 but she entered service on 22 October of that year.
