= Italian offshore patrol vessel Raimondo Montecuccoli =

Thaon di Revel-class offshore patrol vessel

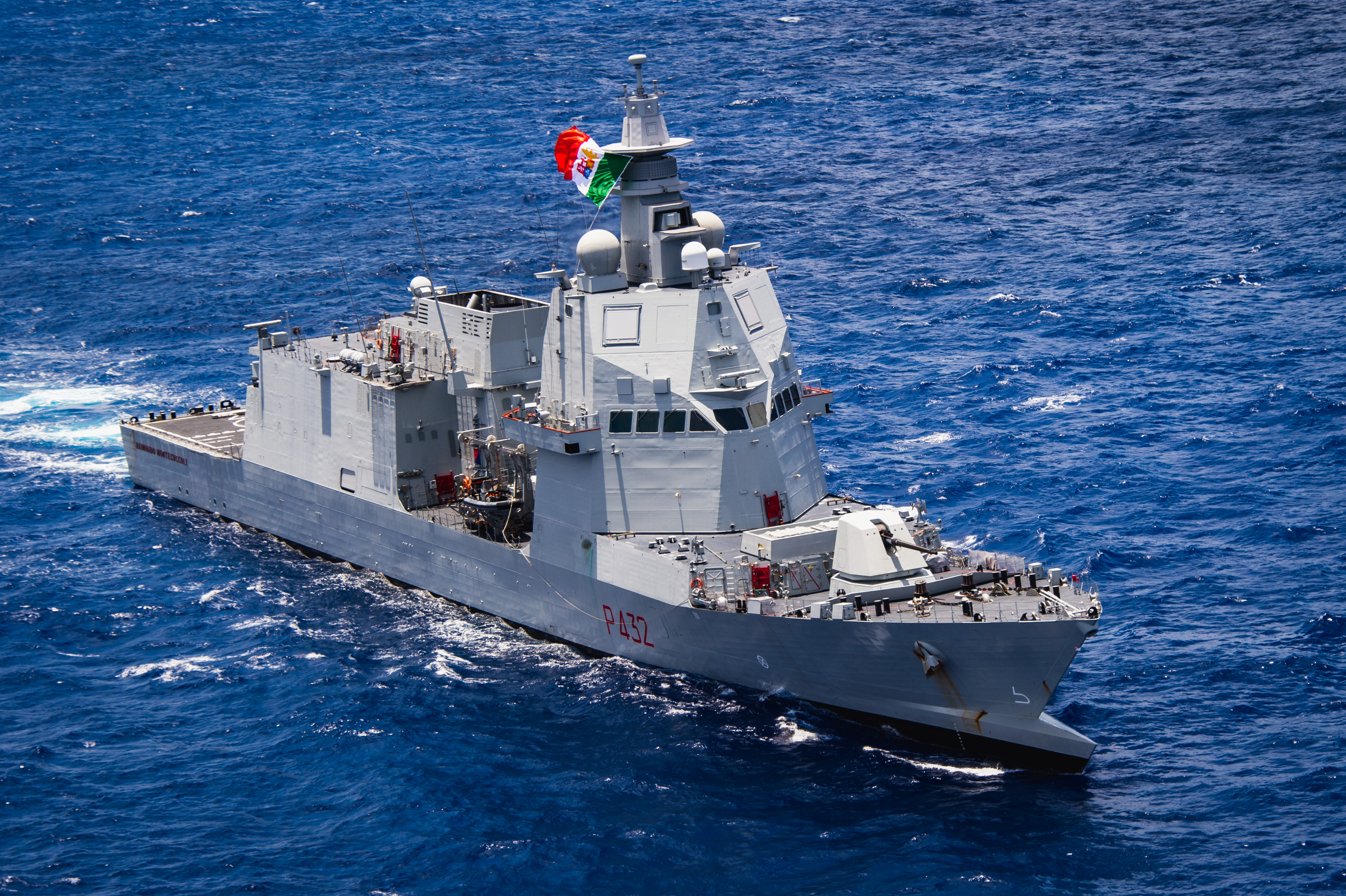
- Raimondo Montecuccoli during RIMPAC 2024 exercise

History

Italy
- Name: Raimondo Montecuccoli
- Namesake: Raimondo Montecuccoli
- Ordered: 2014
- Builder: Fincantieri, Muggiano
- Cost: €0.5 billion
- Laid down: 8 November 2018
- Launched: 13 March 2021
- Commissioned: 27 September 2023
- Identification: Pennant number: P432
- Status: Active

General characteristics
- Class & type: Thaon di Revel-class offshore patrol vessel
- Type: Frigate
- Displacement: light displacement: 4,912 t (4,834 long tons); full displacement: 5,880 t (5,790 long tons)
- Length: 143 m (469 ft 2 in) LOA; 133 m (436 ft 4 in) LPP
- Beam: 16.5 m (54 ft 2 in)
- Draught: 10.5 m (34 ft 5 in)
- Depth: 5 m (16 ft 5 in)
- Propulsion: CODAG CC scheme; 1 × TAG General Electric/Avio LM2500+G4, 32,000 kW (43,000 hp); 2 × diesel engines MTU 20V 8000 M91L, 10,000 kW (13,000 hp) each; 4 x diesel engine generators MAN GenSets 12V175D-MEM 1,640 kW (2,200 hp); 2 × electric engines, 1,350 kW (1,810 hp) each (reversible); 2 x diesel engine emergency generators; 1 × thruster, 550 kW (740 hp); 2 × shafts, driving controllable pitch propellers
- Speed: 27 knots (50 km/h; 31 mph) only on TAG; 25 knots (46 km/h; 29 mph) only on 2 main diesel engines; 18 knots (33 km/h; 21 mph) only on 1 main diesel engine; 10 knots (19 km/h; 12 mph) on electric-diesel engine
- Range: 5,000 nmi (9,300 km; 5,800 mi) at 15 knots (28 km/h; 17 mph)
- Complement: 173 beds (+ 30 on modular rear zone)
- Crew: PPA Full 120 crew;PPA Light+ + 90;PPA Light 90;( add 24 crew for two helos on board and other 89/59 beds for optional boarding team, marines team, maritime command staffs, etc.)
- Sensors & processing systems: Leonardo-Finmeccanica naval cockpit; Leonardo-Finmeccanica SADOC Mk4 CMS (Command Management System) with 28 MFC (20 on PPA Light version); Leonardo-Finmeccanica SAAM-ESD, AAW system; 1 x Leonardo-Finmeccanica LPI air and ground surveillance radar (SPS-732); 2 x Leonardo-Finmeccanica navigation radar, X/Ka dual band radar; 1 x Leonardo-Finmeccanica static IRST (InfraRed Search and Track); 1 x Leonardo-Finmeccanica next generation IFF sensors (Identification Friend & Foe) with circular antenna; 1 x Leonardo-Finmeccanica Diver Detection Sonar; 1 x Leonardo-Finmeccanica Fire Control System, ADT NG NA30S Mk2; 1 x dual-band SATCOM antenna; 1 x tri-band SATCOM antenna; 1 x SAT-TV antenna; 1 x Leonardo-Finmeccanica AESA 3D Dual Band Radar, only C-band radar
- Electronic warfare & decoys: Elettronica-ELT Spa ZEUS System; RESM (Radar Electronic Support Counter-Measure); RECM (Radar Electronic Counter-Measure); CESM (Communication ESM); 2 x Long Range Acoustic Device (Long Range Acoustic System) SITEP MS-424; FFBNW 2 x Oto Melara ODLS-20 decoy launchers
- Armament: 1 × Oto Melara 127 mm/64 Vulcano with Automated Ammunition Handling System (AAHS); 1 × Oto Melara 76 mm/62 Strales Sovraponte anti-aircraft gun; 2 × Oto Melara Oerlikon KBA B06, remote mounting; 2 x 8-cell DCNS SYLVER A70 VLS for 16 Aster 15, 30 or 30B1NT or Scalp Naval; 8 × Teseo\Otomat Mk-2/E anti-ship and land attack missiles; 2 x triple WASS B-515/3 launcher for Black Arrow 324 mm torpedoes
- Aircraft carried: 2 × SH90; 1 × AW101
- Aviation facilities: - double hangar; - flight deck 25.5 m × 16.5 m (83 ft 8 in × 54 ft 2 in)

Raimondo Montecuccoli (P432) is the third ship of the Thaon di Revel-class offshore patrol vessels.

== Development and design ==
The Italian Navy ordered the new MBDA TESEO MK/2E heavy-duty missile (TESEO "EVO"), a long-range anti-ship missilewith also strategic land attack capability. The missile will have a new terminal "head" with dual RF seeker (Radio Frequency) and, presumably, date the need to even attack ground targets, IIR (Imaging IR). Compared to the predecessor OTOMAT/TESEO, the TESEO "EVO" MK/2E has a double range or more than 360 km. Former OTOMAT is accredited for a range of action of more than 180 km.

== Construction and career ==
Raimondo Montecuccoli was laid down on 8 November 2018 at Fincantieri Muggiano and was launched on 13 March 2021. She was commissioned on 27 September 2023.

On 10 October 2024, the Raimondo Montecuccoli arrived at the Port of Colombo, Sri Lanka, for a formal visit under the command of Commander Alessandro Troia. The vessel departed on 13 October 2024 after completing its official engagements.
