= KRI Prabu Siliwangi =

Thaon di Revel-class offshore patrol vessel in service with Indonesian Navy

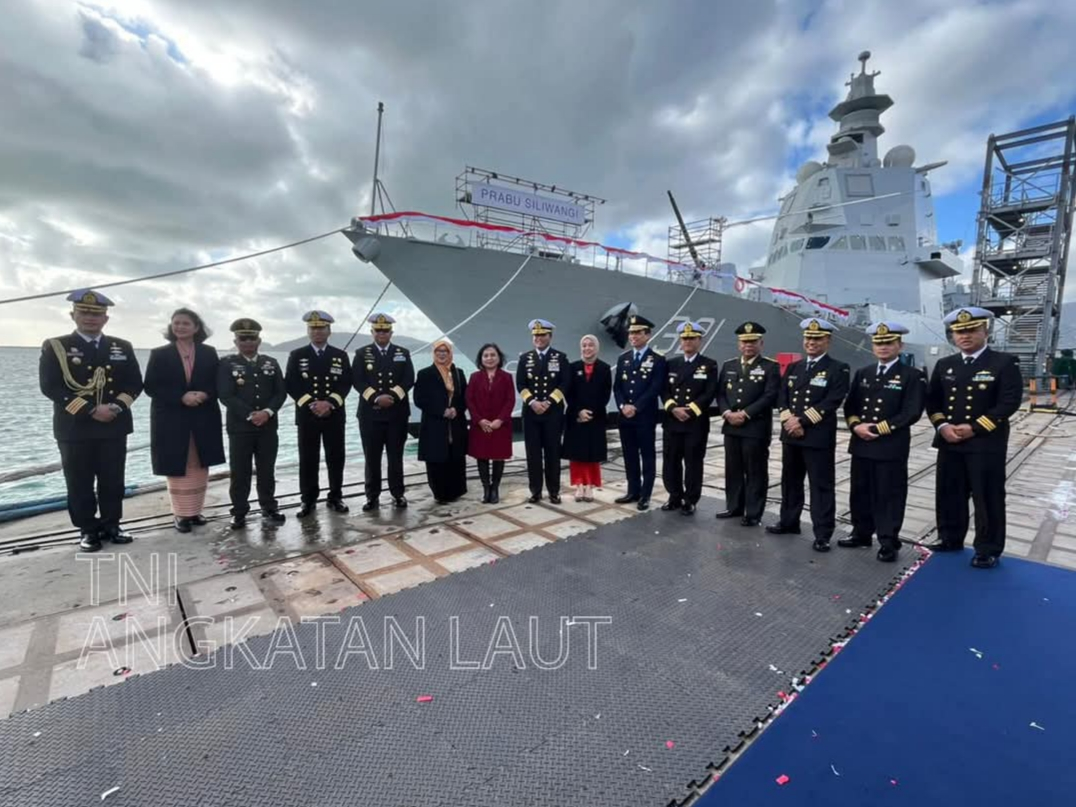
- KRI Prabu Siliwangi at its renaming ceremony, 29 January 2025

History

Italy
- Name: Ruggiero di Lauria
- Namesake: Roger of Lauria
- Ordered: 2014
- Builder: Fincantieri, Muggiano
- Cost: €500 million per unit
- Laid down: 7 April 2021
- Launched: 10 October 2023
- Identification: Pennant number: P435
- Fate: Sold to Indonesia

Indonesia
- Name: Prabu Siliwangi
- Namesake: King Siliwangi
- Christened: 29 January 2025
- Acquired: 28 March 2024
- Commissioned: 22 December 2025
- Home port: Surabaya
- Identification: Pennant number: 321
- Motto: Sanskrit: Palastra Sangkan Kadigjayaan
- Status: In active service
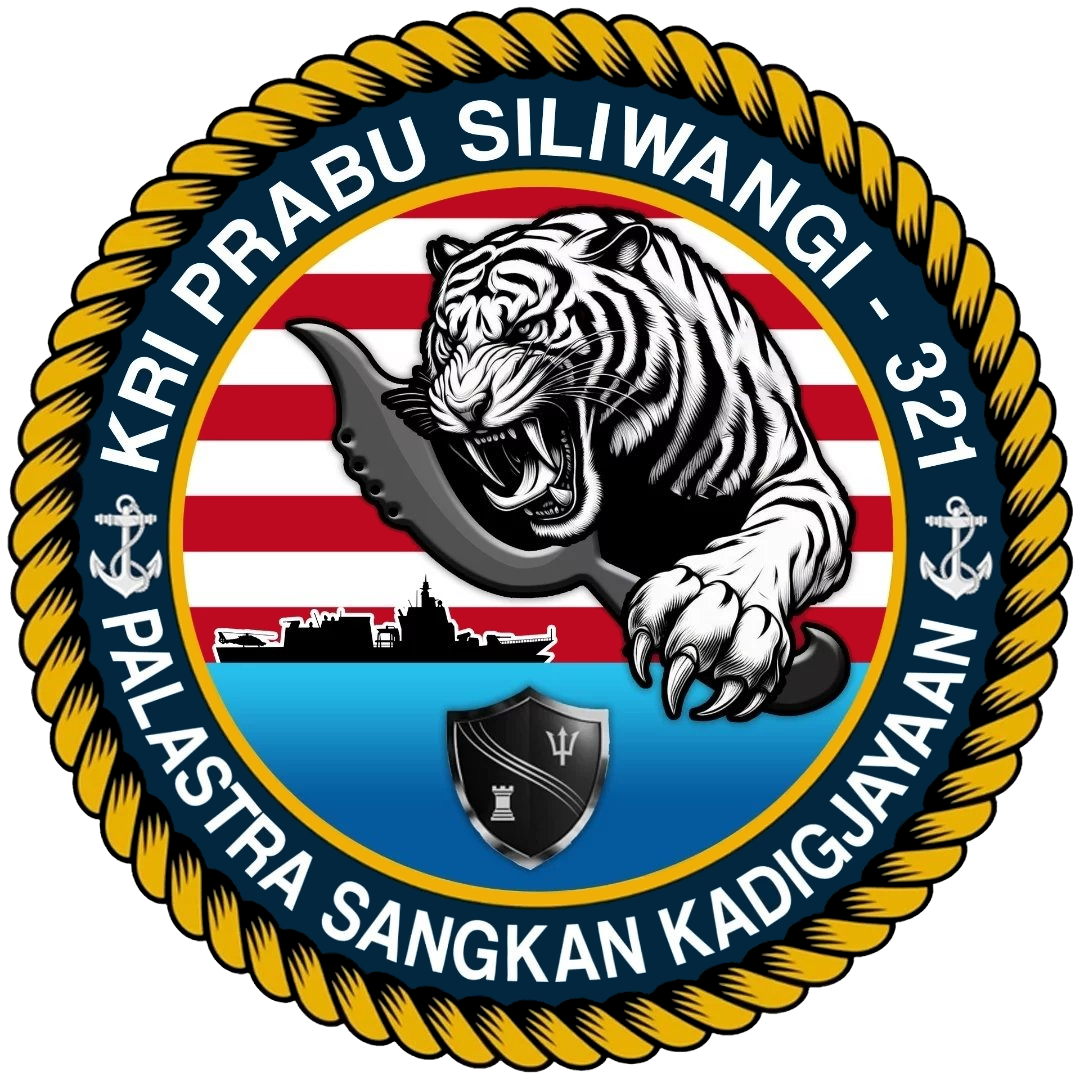
- Badge

General characteristics
- Class & type: Thaon di Revel-class offshore patrol vessel
- Displacement: light displacement: 4,994 t (4,915 long tons); full displacement: 6,270 t (6,170 long tons)
- Length: 143 m (469 ft 2 in) LOA; 133 m (436 ft 4 in) LPP
- Beam: 16.5 m (54 ft 2 in)
- Draught: 10.5 m (34 ft 5 in)
- Depth: 5 m (16 ft 5 in)
- Propulsion: CODAG CC scheme; 1 × TAG General Electric/Avio LM2500+G4, 32,000 kW (43,000 hp); 2 × diesel engines MTU 20V 8000 M91L, 10,000 kW (13,000 hp) each; 4 x diesel engine generators MAN GenSets 12V175D-MEM 1,640 kW (2,200 hp); 2 × electric engines, 1,350 kW (1,810 hp) each (reversible); 2 x diesel engine emergency generators; 1 × thruster, 550 kW (740 hp); 2 × shafts, driving controllable pitch propellers
- Speed: 27 knots (50 km/h; 31 mph) only on TAG; 25 knots (46 km/h; 29 mph) only on 2 main diesel engines; 18 knots (33 km/h; 21 mph) only on 1 main diesel engine; 10 knots (19 km/h; 12 mph) on electric-diesel engine
- Range: 5,000 nmi (9,300 km; 5,800 mi) at 15 knots (28 km/h; 17 mph)
- Complement: 173 beds (+ 30 on modular rear zone)
- Crew: 90 (add 24 crew for two helos on board and other 89/59 beds for optional boarding team, marines team, maritime command staff, etc.)
- Sensors & processing systems: Leonardo-Finmeccanica naval cockpit; Leonardo-Finmeccanica SADOC Mk4 CMS (Command Management System) with 28 MFC; Leonardo-Finmeccanica SAAM-ESD, AAW system; 1 x Leonardo-Finmeccanica LPI air and ground surveillance radar (SPS-732); 2 x Leonardo-Finmeccanica navigation radar, X/Ka dual band radar; 1 x Leonardo-Finmeccanica static IRST (InfraRed Search and Track); 1 x Leonardo-Finmeccanica next generation IFF sensors (Identification Friend & Foe) with circular antenna; 1 x Leonardo-Finmeccanica Diver Detection Sonar; 1 x Leonardo-Finmeccanica Fire Control System, ADT NG NA30S Mk2; 1 x dual-band SATCOM antenna; 1 x tri-band SATCOM antenna; 1 x SAT-TV antenna; 1 x Leonardo-Finmeccanica AESA C-band radar; 1 x Leonardo-Finmeccanica ATAS (Active Towed Array Sonar), VDS sonar; RESM (Radar Electronic Support Counter-Measure); RECM (Radar Electronic Counter-Measure); CESM (Communication ESM); 2 x Oto Melara ODLS-20 decoy launchers
- Armament: 1 × Oto Melara 127 mm/64 Vulcano with Automated Ammunition Handling System (AAHS); 1 × Oto Melara 76 mm/62 Strales Sovraponte anti-aircraft gun; 2 × Oto Melara Oerlikon KBA B06, remote mounting; 2 x 8-cell DCNS SYLVER A70 VLS for 16 missiles (FFBNW)
- Aircraft carried: 1 × AW101 helicopter, or; 2 × AS565 Panther helicopters
- Aviation facilities: double hangar; flight deck 25.5 m × 16.5 m (83 ft 8 in × 54 ft 2 in)

KRI Prabu Siliwangi (321) is a Thaon di Revel-class offshore patrol vessel operated by the Indonesian Navy. The vessel was originally constructed as Ruggiero di Lauria (P435), the sixth ship of the class built for the Italian Navy.

== Construction and career ==
The construction was started with the first steel cutting ceremony on 7 April 2021 at Fincantieri Muggiano. Ruggiero di Lauria was launched on 10 October 2023.

Ruggiero di Lauria is one of the two Thaon di Revel-class vessels sold to the Indonesian Navy in a 1.18 billion Euro contract, which was signed on 28 March 2024. According to Janes, Indonesia managed to obtain a US$1.25 billion loan from several European financial institutions for the acquisition of the two vessels, with the funding facility signed in late 2024. The ship was acquired by the Indonesian Navy in its initial "Light+" configuration. However, Indonesia has indicated interest on upgrading it to the "Full" configuration.

The ship was renamed as KRI Prabu Siliwangi (321) on 29 January 2025 at a ceremony in Muggiano shipyard. Prabu Siliwangi was handed over to the Indonesian Navy and commissioned on 22 December 2025 at the Muggiano shipyard, its first commander being Colonel Kurniawan Koes Atmadja. The ship was initially planned to arrive in Indonesia by January 2026.

Prabu Siliwangi departed Italy on 11 February 2026. The frigate circumnavigated Africa on its delivery voyage to Indonesia and made port calls in Morocco, Nigeria, South Africa, and Mauritius. Prabu Siliwangi arrived in Bandar Lampung on 22 March. Four days later the ship went to Port of Tanjung Priok in Jakarta to attend its welcoming ceremony.
