= KRI Brawijaya =

Thaon di Revel-class offshore patrol vessel in service with Indonesian Navy

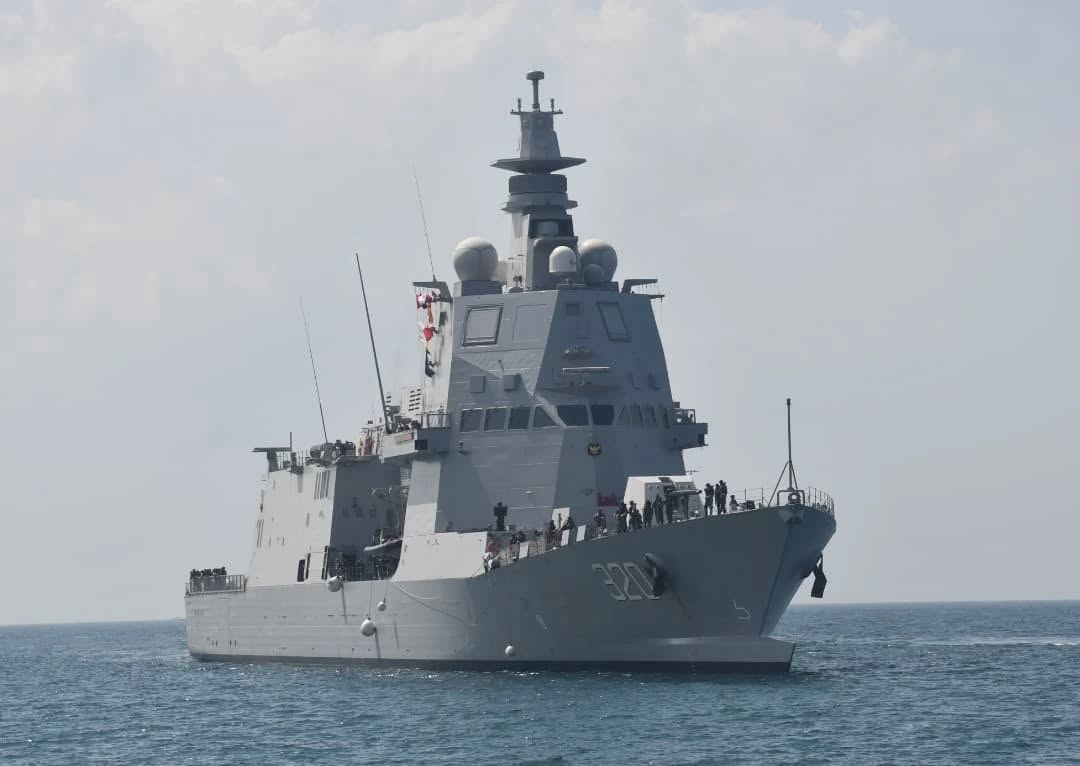
- KRI Brawijaya arrived at Lampung Naval Base on 4 September 2025

History

Italy
- Name: Marcantonio Colonna
- Namesake: Marcantonio Colonna
- Ordered: 2014
- Builder: Fincantieri, Muggiano
- Cost: €500 million per unit
- Laid down: 3 September 2020
- Launched: 26 November 2022
- Identification: Pennant number: P433
- Fate: Sold to Indonesia

Indonesia
- Name: KRI Brawijaya
- Namesake: Brawijaya (id)
- Christened: 29 January 2025
- Acquired: 28 March 2024
- Commissioned: 2 July 2025
- Home port: Surabaya
- Identification: MMSI number: 525114130; Callsign: YDPS3; Pennant number: 320
- Motto: Sanskrit: Vira Samudra Sasvata
- Status: In active service
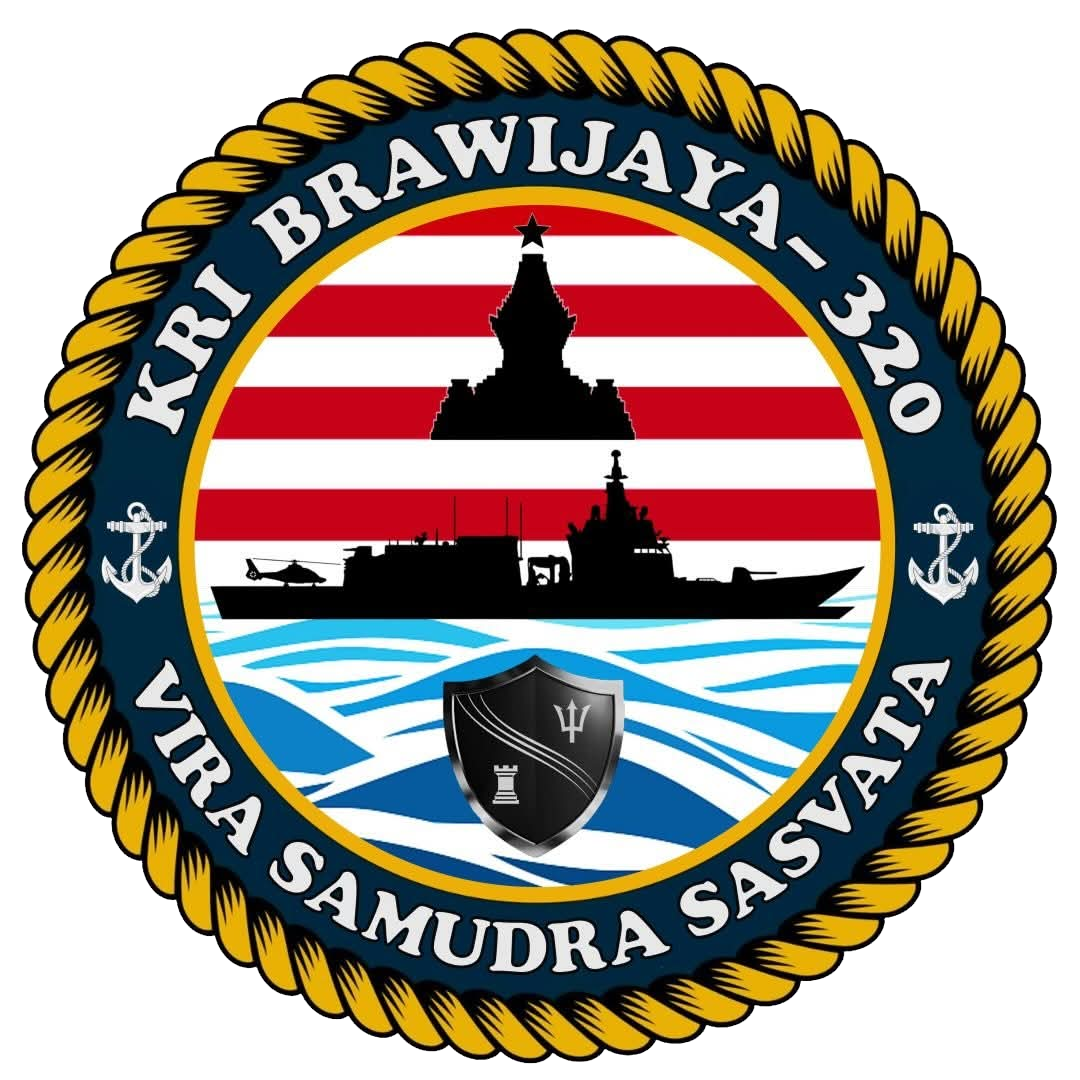
- Badge

General characteristics
- Class & type: Thaon di Revel-class offshore patrol vessel
- Displacement: light displacement: 4,994 t (4,915 long tons); full displacement: 6,270 t (6,170 long tons)
- Length: 143 m (469 ft 2 in) LOA; 133 m (436 ft 4 in) LPP
- Beam: 16.5 m (54 ft 2 in)
- Draught: 10.5 m (34 ft 5 in)
- Depth: 5 m (16 ft 5 in)
- Propulsion: CODAG CC scheme; 1 × TAG General Electric/Avio LM2500+G4, 32,000 kW (43,000 hp); 2 × diesel engines MTU 20V 8000 M91L, 10,000 kW (13,000 hp) each; 4 x diesel engine generators MAN GenSets 12V175D-MEM 1,640 kW (2,200 hp); 2 × electric engines, 1,350 kW (1,810 hp) each (reversible); 2 x diesel engine emergency generators; 1 × thruster, 550 kW (740 hp); 2 × shafts, driving controllable pitch propellers
- Speed: 27 knots (50 km/h; 31 mph) only on TAG; 25 knots (46 km/h; 29 mph) only on 2 main diesel engines; 18 knots (33 km/h; 21 mph) only on 1 main diesel engine; 10 knots (19 km/h; 12 mph) on electric-diesel engine
- Range: 5,000 nmi (9,300 km; 5,800 mi) at 15 knots (28 km/h; 17 mph)
- Complement: 173 beds (+ 30 on modular rear zone)
- Crew: 90 (add 24 crew for two helos on board and other 89/59 beds for optional boarding team, marines team, maritime command staff, etc.)
- Sensors & processing systems: Leonardo-Finmeccanica naval cockpit; Leonardo-Finmeccanica SADOC Mk4 CMS (Command Management System) with 28 MFC; Leonardo-Finmeccanica SAAM-ESD, AAW system; 1 x Leonardo-Finmeccanica LPI air and ground surveillance radar (SPS-732); 2 x Leonardo-Finmeccanica navigation radar, X/Ka dual band radar; 1 x Leonardo-Finmeccanica static IRST (InfraRed Search and Track); 1 x Leonardo-Finmeccanica next generation IFF sensors (Identification Friend & Foe) with circular antenna; 1 x Leonardo-Finmeccanica Diver Detection Sonar; 1 x Leonardo-Finmeccanica Fire Control System, ADT NG NA30S Mk2; 1 x dual-band SATCOM antenna; 1 x tri-band SATCOM antenna; 1 x SAT-TV antenna; 1 x Leonardo-Finmeccanica AESA C-band radar; 1 x Leonardo-Finmeccanica ATAS (Active Towed Array Sonar), VDS sonar; RESM (Radar Electronic Support Counter-Measure); RECM (Radar Electronic Counter-Measure); CESM (Communication ESM); 2 x Oto Melara ODLS-20 decoy launchers
- Armament: 1 × Oto Melara 127 mm/64 Vulcano with Automated Ammunition Handling System (AAHS); 1 × Oto Melara 76 mm/62 Strales Sovraponte anti-aircraft gun; 2 × Oto Melara Oerlikon KBA B06, remote mounting; 2 x 8-cell DCNS SYLVER A70 VLS for 16 missiles (FFBNW)
- Aircraft carried: 1 × AW101 helicopter, or; 2 × AS565 Panther helicopters
- Aviation facilities: double hangar; flight deck 25.5 m × 16.5 m (83 ft 8 in × 54 ft 2 in)

KRI Brawijaya (320) is a Thaon di Revel-class offshore patrol vessel operated by the Indonesian Navy. The vessel was originally constructed as Marcantonio Colonna (P433), the fifth ship of the class built for the Italian Navy.

== Construction and career ==
It was laid down on 3 September 2020 at Fincantieri Muggiano and was launched on 26 November 2022. Marcantonio Colonna started sea trials in July 2023.

Marcantonio Colonna is one of the two Thaon di Revel-class vessels sold to the Indonesian Navy in a 1.18 billion Euro contract, which was signed on 28 March 2024. According to Janes, Indonesia has secured a 1.25 billion US dollar funding from several European financial institutions for the acquisition of the two vessels, with the funding facility signed in late 2024.

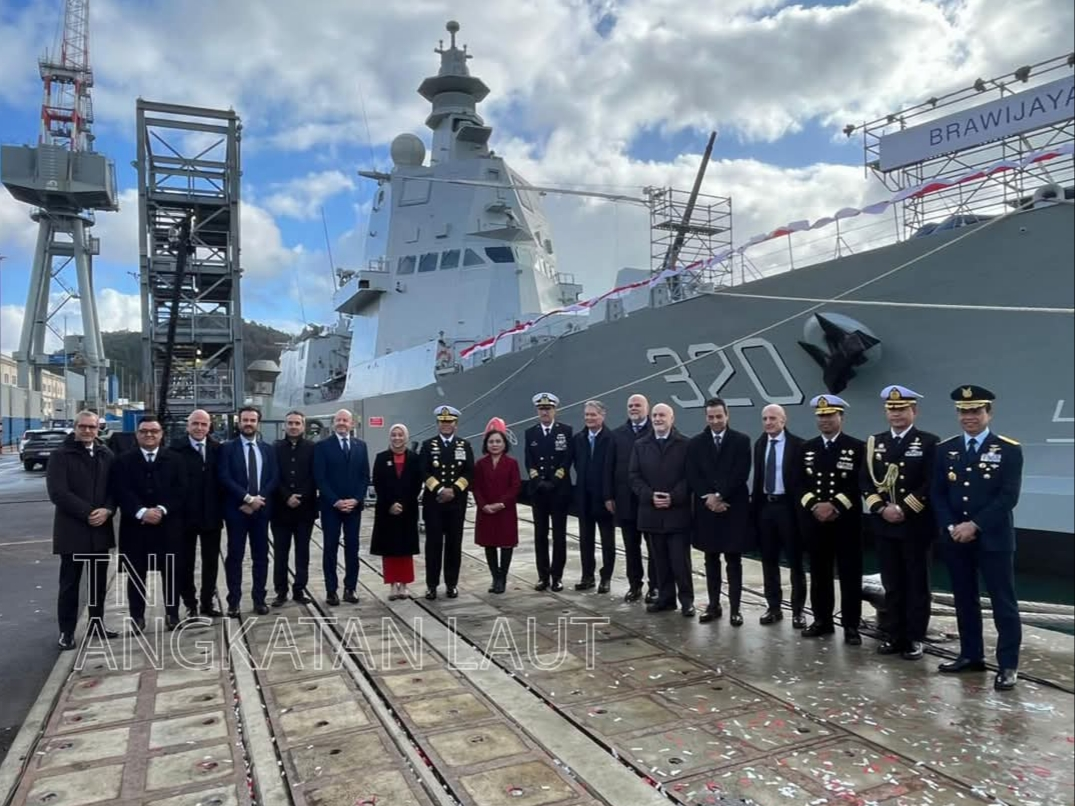
KRI Brawijaya at its renaming ceremony, January 2025

The ship was renamed as KRI Brawijaya (320) on 29 January 2025 at a ceremony in Muggiano shipyard. Brawijaya was handed over to the Indonesian Navy and commissioned on 2 July 2025 at the Muggiano shipyard, its first Commander being Colonel John David Nalasakti Sondakh. The ship was assigned to the 2nd Fleet Command, based in Surabaya. Brawijaya departed La Spezia and sailed for Indonesia on 29 July and planned to arrive in Surabaya on 10 September.

Brawijaya was delivered to the Indonesian Navy in its initial "Light+" configuration. However, Indonesia has indicated interest on upgrading the ship to the "Full" configuration.

Brawijaya made port visits to Mersin, Turkey; Alexandria, Egypt; Jeddah, Saudi Arabia; Fujairah, United Arab Emirates; and the last one was on 27 August, when Brawijaya arrived at the Port of Colombo, Sri Lanka, on a replenishment visit. The vessel is scheduled to depart the island on 30 August. Along the way, Brawijaya performed joint exercises with various warships from foreign navies, such as ENS Tahya Misr, Caio Duilio, Bani Yas, and also the Indonesian corvette KRI Sultan Iskandar Muda which was on UNIFIL deployment in Lebanon.

Brawijaya arrived at Lampung Naval Base in Bandar Lampung on 4 September. The ship went to the Port of Tanjung Priok, Jakarta on 8 September and was inspected by high-ranking officials. Brawijaya arrived in Surabaya on 10 September as planned.
