= Thaon di Revel-class patrol vessel =

Italian Navy ship class

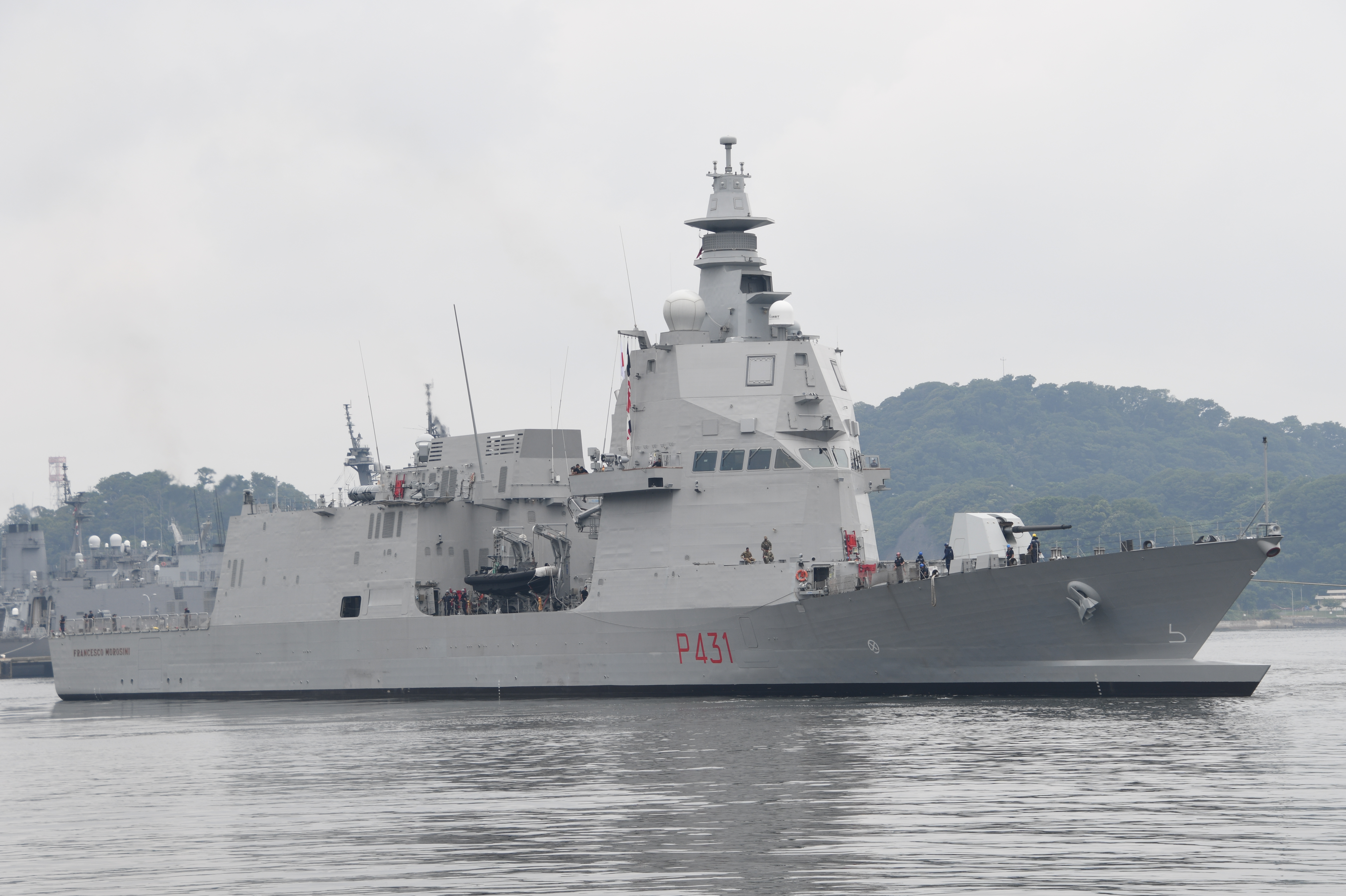
- Second ship of the class, Francesco Morosini (P431) in JMSDF Yokosuka Naval Base, June 2023

Class overview
- Name: Thaon di Revel class
- Builders: Fincantieri, Muggiano and Riva Trigoso (La Spezia)
- Operators: Italian Navy; Indonesian Navy
- Preceded by: Soldati class (Italy); Minerva class (Italy); Martadinata class (Indonesia)
- Cost: €3.9 billion for 7 units; €557 million per unit
- Built: 2016–present
- In commission: 2021–present
- Planned: 9
- Building: 2
- Completed: 7
- Active: 7

General characteristics
- Type: frigate / patrol vessel
- Displacement: Configurations "light" / "full load" by variant: PPA Full: 4,994 t (4,915 long tons) / 6,270 t (6,170 long tons); PPA Light+: 4,912 t (4,834 long tons) / 5,880 t (5,790 long tons); PPA Light: light displacement: 4,880 t (4,800 long tons); full load displacement 5,830 t (5,740 long tons)
- Length: 143 m (469 ft 2 in) (LOA); 133 m (436 ft 4 in) (LPP)
- Beam: 16.5 m (54 ft 2 in)
- Draught: 5 m (16 ft 5 in)
- Depth: 10.5 m (34 ft 5 in)
- Propulsion: CODAG CC scheme: 1 × TAG GE / Avio Aero LM2500+G4, 32,000 kW (43,000 hp); 2 × diesel engines MTU 20V 8000 M91L, 10,000 kW (13,000 hp) each; 4 × diesel engine generators MAN GenSets 12V175D-MEM, 1,640 kW (2,200 hp) each; since 4th PPA, replaced by Isotta Fraschini 16V170C2ME 1,600 kW (2,100 hp) each; 2 × electric motors, 1,350 kW (1,810 hp) each (reversible); 2 × diesel engine emergency generators; 1 × thruster, 550 kW (740 hp); 2 × shafts, driving controllable pitch propellers
- Speed: 31.6 knots (58.5 km/h; 36.4 mph) on CODAG; 27 knots (50 km/h; 31 mph) only on TAG; 25 knots (46 km/h; 29 mph) only on 2 main diesel engines; 18 knots (33 km/h; 21 mph) only on 1 main diesel engine; 10 knots (19 km/h; 12 mph) on electric-diesel engine; all data refers to PPA Full version
- Range: 5,000 nmi (9,300 km; 5,800 mi) at 15 knots (28 km/h; 17 mph)
- Complement: 173 beds (+ 30 on modular rear zone)
- Crew: PPA Full 120; PPA Light+ > 90; PPA Light 90; Note: 24 crew needed for two helicopters on board and other 89/59 beds for optional boarding team, marines team, maritime command staffs, etc.)
- Sensors & processing systems: Systems: Leonardo naval cockpit; Leonardo SADOC Mk4 CMS (Combat Management System) with 28 MFC (20 on PPA Light version); Leonardo SAAM-ESD, AAW system; 1 × Leonardo Fire Control System, ADT NG NA-30S Mk2; Radars: 1 × Leonardo LPI air and ground surveillance radar (SPS-732); 2 × Leonardo navigation radar, X/Ka dual band radar; 1 × Leonardo next generation IFF sensors (Identification Friend & Foe) with circular antenna; EO/IR sensors: 1 × Leonardo static IRST (InfraRed Search and Track); Sonars: 1 × Leonardo Diver Detection Sonar; Communication systems: 1 × dual-band SATCOM antenna; 1 × tri-band SATCOM antenna; 1* × SAT-TV antenna; Systems specific to PPA Full: Radars: Leonardo AESA 3D Dual Band Radar, C and X-band radar; Anti-submarine systems: Leonardo ATAS (Active Towed Array Sonar), VDS; Leonardo Black Snake, anti torpedo towed array sonar; Leonardo Bathy Thermograph Unit; Communications: Leonardo Underwater Telephone; PPA Light+: Radar: Leonardo AESA 3D Dual Band Radar, only C-band radar; PPA Light: Radar: Leonardo AESA 3D Dual Band Radar, only X-band radar
- Electronic warfare & decoys: Elettronica-ELT Spa ZEUS System: RESM (Radar Electronic Support Counter-Measure), RECM (Radar Electronic Counter-Measure) and CESM (Communication ESM); 2 × Long Range Acoustic System SITEP MS-424; 2 × Oto Melara ODLS-20 decoy launchers; PPA Full equipped with launchers; PPA Light+ / Light: FFBNW (fitted for but not with)
- Armament: Guns: 1 × Oto Melara 127 mm/64 Vulcano with Automated Ammunition Handling System (AAHS); 1 × Oto Melara 76 mm/62 Strales Sovraponte anti-aircraft gun; 2 × Oto Melara Oerlikon KBA B06, remote mounting; Anti-air missiles: 2 × 8-cell DCNS SYLVER A50 VLS with 16 Aster 30 Block 1NT; PPA Full and Light+: fitted with; PPA Light: FFBNW (fitted for but not with); PPA Full and Light+: 2 × 8-cell DCNS DCNS SYLVER A50 VLS for 16 Aster 30 Block 1NT; Anti-ship missiles: 2 × 4 Teseo Mk 2 E cruise missile (anti-ship and land-attack); PPA Full: fitted with; PPA Light+ and Light: FFBNW (fitted for but not with); Torpedoes: 2 × WASS B-515/3 launcher with 3 × Black Arrow (A244/S Mod 4) lightweight torpedo (324 mm): PPA Full: fitted with; PPA Light+ and Light: FFBNW (fitted for but not with)
- Aircraft carried: Italian Navy: 2 × SH90, or; 1 × EH-101A; Indonesian Navy: 2 × AS565 Panther
- Aviation facilities: Double hangar; Flight deck 25.5 m × 16.5 m (83 ft 8 in × 54 ft 2 in)
- Notes: Stern ramp for RHIB over 11 m (36 ft 1 in); 2 × 10 t (9.8 long tons) side davits, for movement of RHIB over 11 m (36 ft 1 in); 1 × 20 t (20 long tons) crane, for movement of ISO1C containers; up to 5 × ISO1C containers or up to 3 × RHIB over 11 m (36 ft 1 in) in mission bay under flight deck; up to 8 × ISO1C containers or up to 2 × RHIB over 11 m (36 ft 1 in) on middle ship bay

The Thaon di Revel class (also known as PPA for 'Pattugliatore Polivalente d'Altura - Multipurpose Offshore Patrol Vessel') is a class of frigate built by Fincantieri for the Italian Navy.

It is planned to replace four Soldati-class light patrol frigates and eight Minerva-class corvettes between 2021 and 2035. As part of the 2014 Naval Law, a total of sixteen ships were planned, and as of 2019, seven vessels have been financed with three more on deck but not yet funded. European Patrol Corvette, a class of lighter ships built into an EU cooperation should complete the Italian Navy needs.

In March 2024, the Indonesian Ministry of Defense signed a contract with Fincantieri for the acquisition of two of the ships under construction for the Italian Navy. In June 2025, the Italian Navy ordered two ships to replace the ships sold to Indonesia; these ships are to be in the light+ configuration.

== Variants ==
The class, designed with a high level of modularity and automation, will be delivered in a full, a light+ and a light configuration, each of which having different sensors and equipment. It can perform multiple functions, ranging from patrol with sea rescue capacity, to civil protection operations and, in its most highly equipped version, first-line fighting.

The Light configuration has only gun armaments and X band radar 4FF. The Light+ (C band radar 4FF) and Full (complete DBR radar) options also mount two eight-cell Sylver vertical launching system for Aster anti-aircraft missiles, including the 30 NT, which is capable of intercepting MRBMs. The Full version includes eight TESEO "EVO" MK2/E anti-ship missile launchers, two triple torpedo launchers for anti-submarine warfare, an Active Towed Array Sonar and a full suite of EW: RESM, CESM, RECM. Ships with the Light and Light+ configurations have the fitted for but not with provision for missiles and torpedoes, and could be upgraded to the Full configuration at a later date.

According to RID, the Italian Navy ordered the new MBDA TESEO MK/2E heavy-duty missile (TESEO "EVO"), a long-range anti-ship missile with also land attack capability. Compared to the predecessor OTOMAT/TESEO, the TESEO "EVO" MK/2E has double the range, or more than 360 km.

During the launching ceremony of Marcantonio Colonna on 26 November 2022, Chief of Staff of the Italian Navy Admiral Enrico Credendino announced that the two 'Light' configuration ships – Paolo Thaon di Revel and Francesco Morosini – would be refitted into the 'Full' configuration. On 23 April 2026, the Italian Navy awarded Fincantieri a contract to bring all ships of the class to 'Full' configuration.

== Ships ==
Italics indicate estimated dates

Sub-class	Name	No.	Hull no.	Contract	Steel cut	Laid down	Launched	Comm.	Notes
Italian Navy - Thaon di Revel class
PPA Light	Paolo Thaon di Revel	P430	6261	7 May 2015	2 Dec 2016	9 May 2017	15 Jun 2019	18 Mar 2022	Amendment No. 10, to be retrofitted to PPA FULL standard (21 Apr 2026).
PPA Light	Francesco Morosini	P431	6262	7 May 2015	13 Feb 2017	16 Feb 2018	15 May 2020	22 Oct 2022	Amendment No. 10, to be retrofitted to PPA FULL standard (21 Apr 2026).
PPA Light+	Raimondo Montecuccoli	P432	6263	7 May 2015	20 Feb 2018	8 Nov 2018	13 Mar 2021	27 Sep 2023	Amendment No. 10, to be retrofitted to PPA FULL standard (21 Apr 2026).
PPA Full	Giovanni delle Bande Nere	P434	6264	7 May 2015	–	28 Aug 2019	12 Feb 2022	2 Oct 2024	
PPA Full	Domenico Millelire	P436	6267	7 May 2015	–	17 May 2022	13 Jul 2024	24 Sep 2026	
PPA Full	Marcantonio Colonna	P433	6396	7 May 2015; Amendment No. 9	4 Feb 2026	29 May 2026	Apr 2028	2029	Contract for a PPA Light+ standard. Amendment No. 10, built to PPA FULL standard (21 Apr 2026).
PPA Full	Ruggiero di Lauria	P435	6397	7 May 2015; Amendment No. 9	15 Oct 2026	–	–	2030	Contract for a PPA Light+ standard. Amendment No. 10, built to PPA FULL standard (21 Apr 2026).
Indonesian Navy - Brawijaya class
PPA Light+	Brawijaya	320	6265	28 Mar 2024; Indonesia; 7 May 2015 (Italy)	–	3 Sep 2020	26 Nov 2022	2 Jul 2025	Renamed from Marcantonio Colonna (P433) and Ruggiero di Lauria (P435) in January 2025, when sold to Indonesia.
PPA Light+	Prabu Siliwangi	321	6266	28 Mar 2024; Indonesia; 7 May 2015 (Italy)	7 Apr 2021	20 Oct 2021	6 Oct 2023	22 Dec 2025	Renamed from Marcantonio Colonna (P433) and Ruggiero di Lauria (P435) in January 2025, when sold to Indonesia.

== Exports ==
=== Indonesia ===
In October 2023, Italy planned to export two ships to Indonesia. The ships to be sold would be among those already being built for the Italian navy in order to accelerate delivery. Transfer of technology and know-how would also included in the deal.

In March 2024, Fincantieri and the Indonesian Ministry of Defence signed a 1.18 billion euro contract for the supply of two PPA Units.

According to Janes, Indonesia borrowed US$1.25 billion in funding from three European banks, BNP Paribas (France), Credit Agricole (France) and SACE (Italy), to finance the purchase.

The Indonesian government named the two vessels as KRI Brawijaya (320) and KRI Prabu Siliwangi (321). The vessels were officially renamed on 29 January 2025. Brawijaya arrived in Jakarta on 8 September 2025, with Prabu Siliwangi following on 26 March 2026. Both ships are based in Surabaya.

The Indonesian Navy is interested in upgrading both ships to the "Full" configuration from its present "Light+" configuration. Fincantieri stated that such an upgrade could be done in Indonesia through collaboration with local shipyards. In March 2026, the Indonesian Navy was considering whether to equip the ships with missiles from Italy, France, or Turkey. The additional onboard sensors that would be fitted to the ships are also under assessment.

=== Potential exports ===
Italy's latest proposal for the Hellenic Navy contains four Al Zubarah-class corvettes, a type designed for the Qatari Emiri Navy, and two Thaon di Revel-class multipurpose offshore ships.
