= NA-30S Mk2 =

Fire-control system

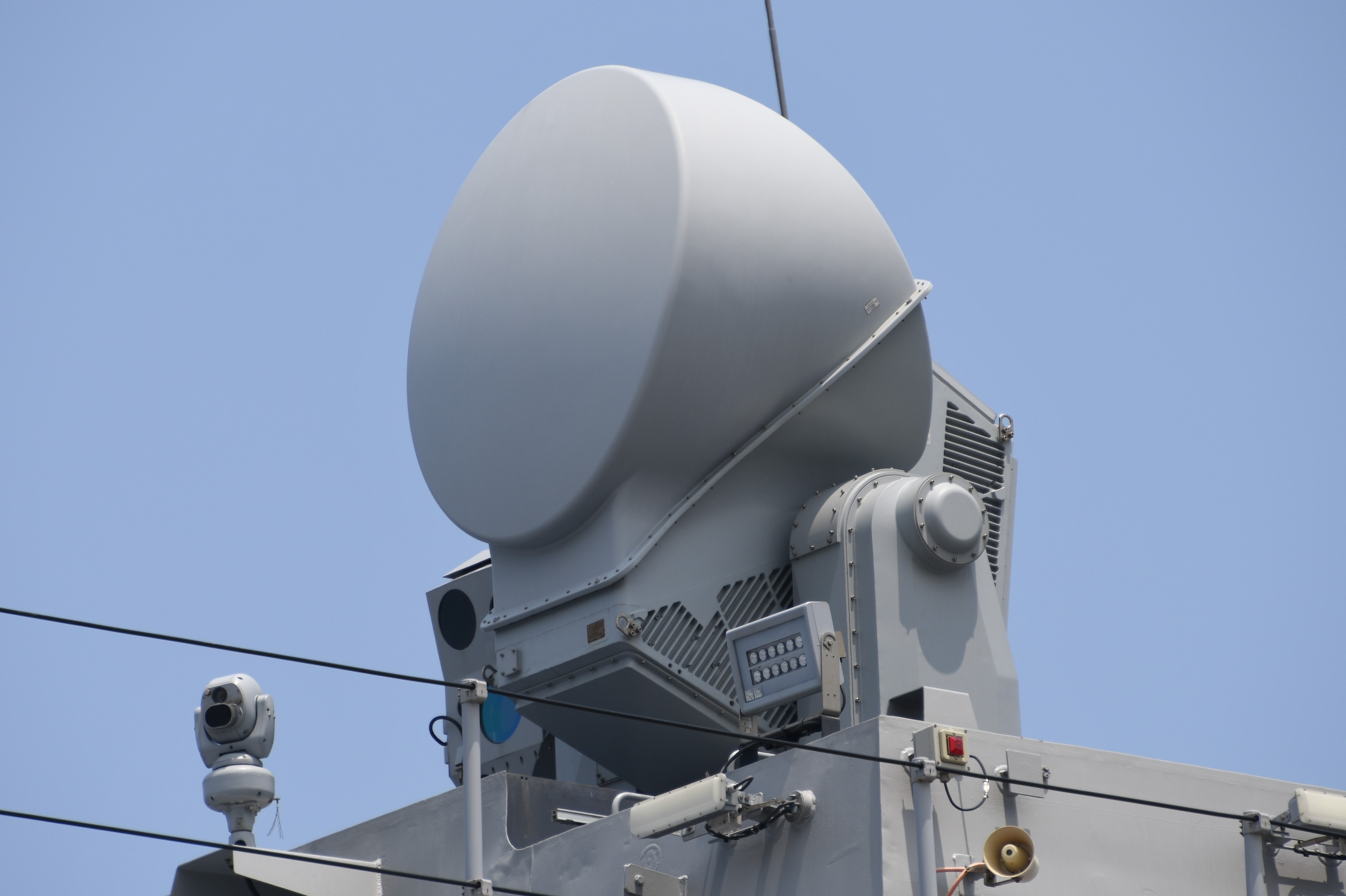
Leonardo NA-30S MK2 FCS on helicopter hanger of Francesco Morosini (P-431)

The NA-30S MK 2 is a radar and electro-optical fire-control system manufactured by Leonardo S.p.A for the control of naval guns such as the OTO Melara 76 mm. It can optionally be fitted with a Continuous Wave Illuminator (CWI) to guide missiles that use semi-active radar homing.

The NA-30S uses both the X band, for medium-range search and tracking, and the Ka band, for close targets and low-flying threats. TV cameras, infra-red cameras and a laser can also be mounted on the system.

The director is able to control up to three 76 mm guns and can also be used to control Leonardo's DART guided ammunition without the need to install the STRALES guidance on each gun mount.

== Operators ==
- Italy
- UAE
- ROC
