= Otobreda 127/64 =

OTO 127/64 LW - VULCANO System
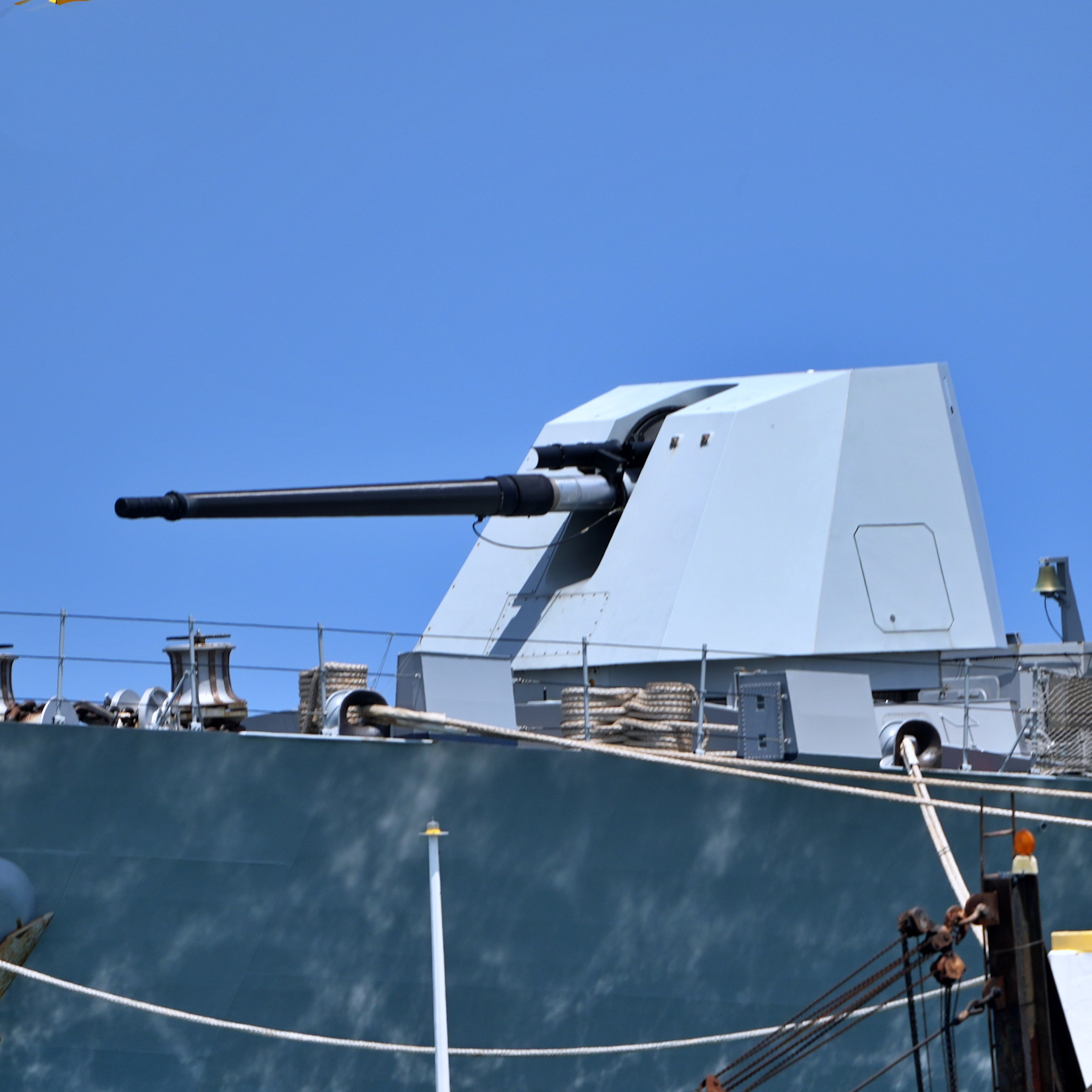
- The OTO 127/64 LW gun mount on Italian OPV Francesco Morosini
- Type: Naval gun
- Place of origin: Italy

Production history
- Designer: Oto Melara
- Designed: 2005
- Manufacturer: Oto Melara (now Leonardo S.p.A.)
- Produced: 2012

Specifications
- Mass: Empty: 33 t (73,000 lb)
- Barrel length: 320 in (8.1 m)
- Shell: 127x835mmR shell weight: 29 to 31 kg (64 to 68 lb)
- Caliber: 127 mm (5.0 in)
- Rate of fire: 32 rpm
- Muzzle velocity: 808 m/s (2,650 ft/s)
- Effective firing range: 30 km (19 mi); VULCANO: 70–120 km (43–75 mi)
- Maximum firing range: 120 km (75 mi)

External image
- Hi-res image of Oto Melara 127/64
- Publicity shot of the Oto Melara 127/64

The OTO 127/64 LW (light-weight) Gun assembly is a rapid-fire gun mount suitable for installation on large and medium size ships. It also has a version for coastal defense, intended for surface fire and naval gunfire support as main role and anti-aircraft fire as secondary role. The compactness of the gun feeding system makes installation on narrow section crafts possible.

The gun can fire all standard 127 mm (5 inch) ammunition including Vulcano long range guided ammunition. By that, it is officially branded as the OTO 127/64 LW - VULCANO System by Leonardo for marketing.

Modular automatic feeding magazines allow the firing of up to four different and immediately selectable types of ammunition; the magazines (four drums, each with one shell ready to fire and 13 other ammunitions on store) can be reloaded while the mount is in operation.

An ammunition manipulator system is available to transport projectiles and propelling charges from the main ammunition store to the feeding magazines, which are automatically reloaded. Ammunition flow is reversible. Rounds can be automatically unloaded from the gun. Digital and analog interfaces are available for connecting to a vessel's combat management system, including a CORBA based network interface.

The 127/64 LW naval gun mounts includes a Vulcano module, which acts twofold:

- Programmer for ammunition's fuse and guidance system.
- Mission Planning and Execution for Naval Fire Support Action (firing solutions, selection of ammunition, definition of trajectories and firing sequences, ballistic computations accounting for ammunition type, etc.), as a standalone or in interaction with ship's Network Centric System.

== Operators ==
=== Current operators ===
Algerian National Navy

- 2 × Erradii-class frigates

Egyptian Navy

- 2 × FREMM multipurpose class frigate (2 in option)
- 4 x Al-Aziz-class frigates

German Navy

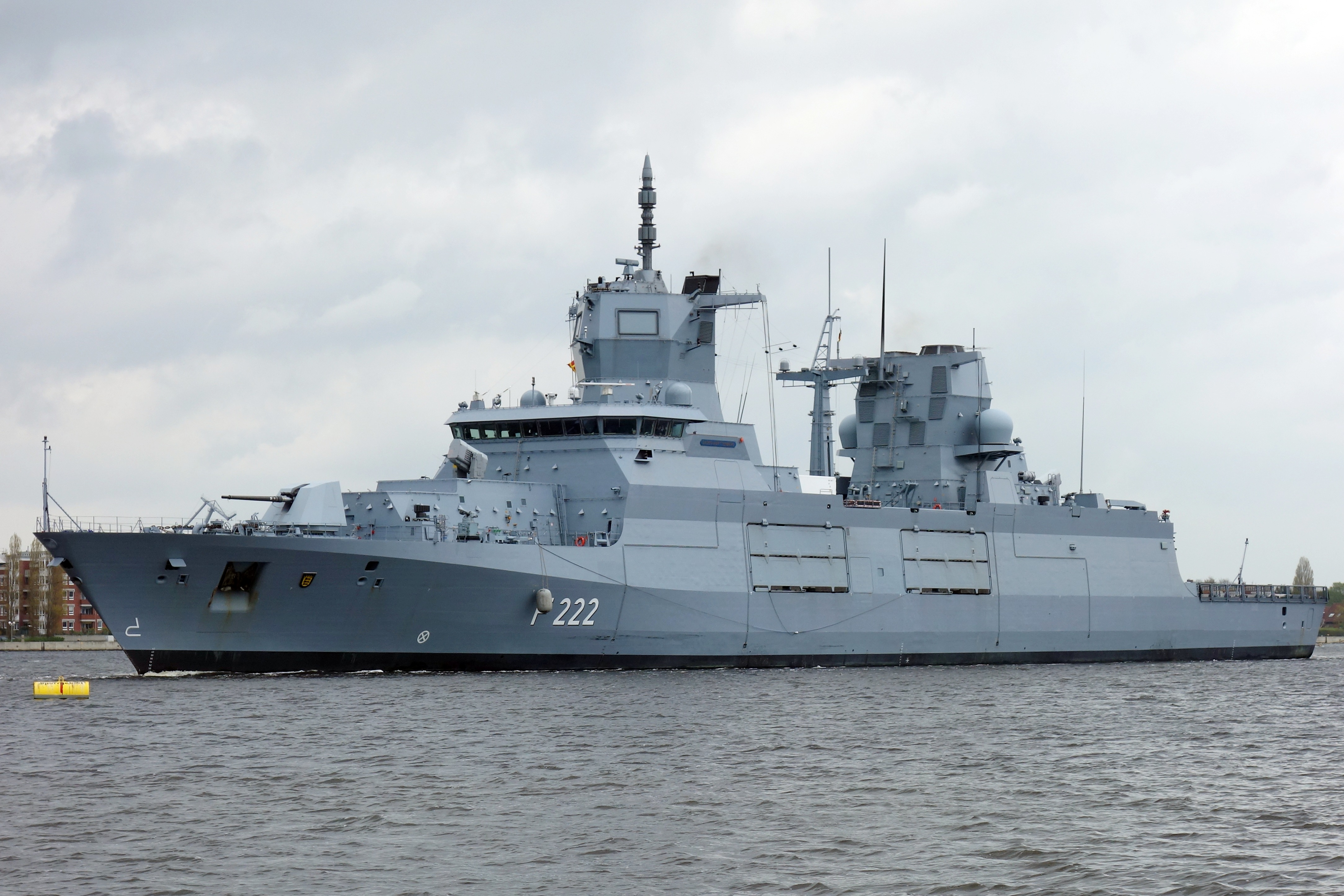
The Baden-Württemberg, a German Navy F125-class frigate featuring the OTO 127/64 gun mount

- 4 × Baden-Württemberg-class frigate and 1 used for training

Italian Navy

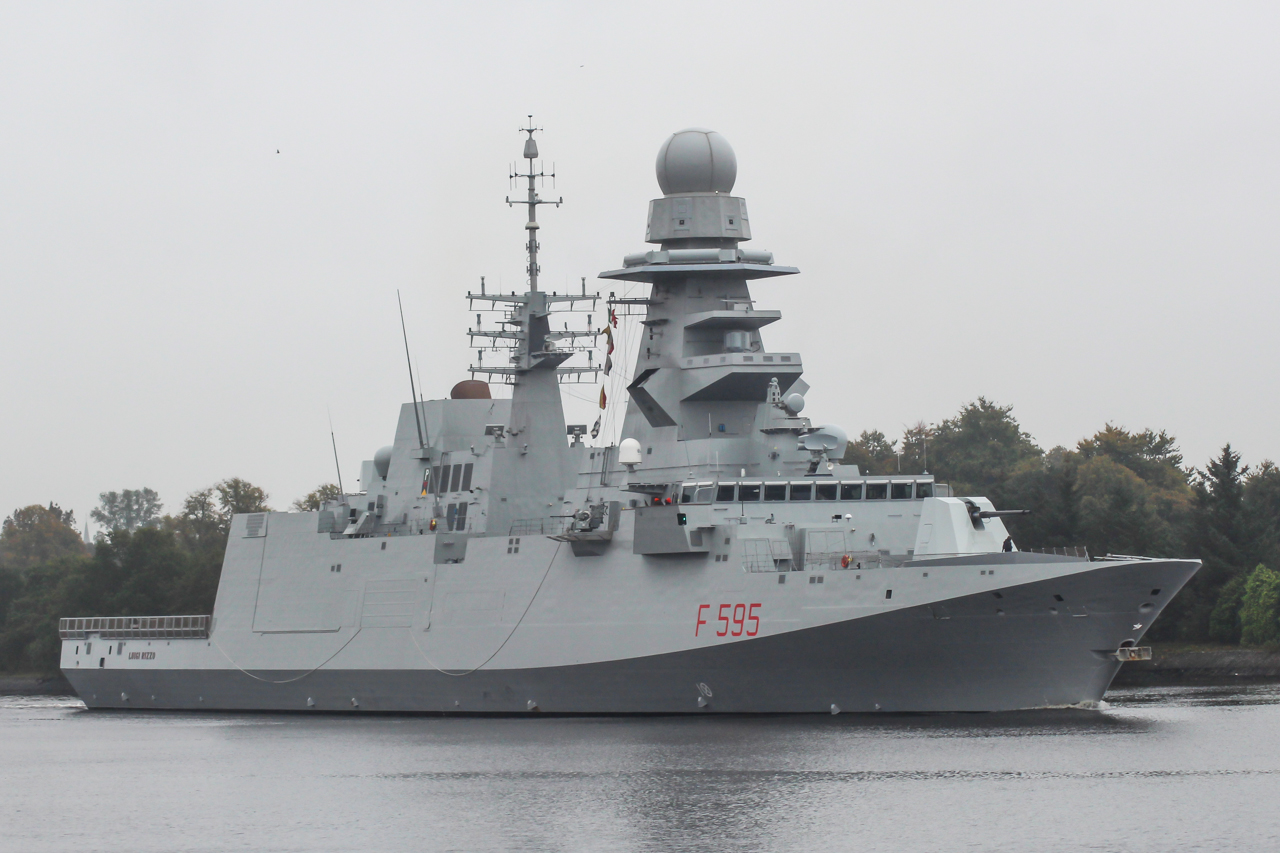
Italian frigate Luigi Rizzo with the OTO 127/64 being the primary gun mount.

- 6 × FREMM multipurpose frigate (2 in option)
- 5 × Thaon di Revel-class Offshore Patrol Vessel

Royal Netherlands Navy

- 4 × De Zeven Provinciën-class frigate Ordered April 2020, replacing current 127mm from 2023 to 2025.

Indonesian Navy

- 2 × Thaon di Revel-class Offshore Patrol Vessel

=== Future operators ===
Spanish Navy

- 5 × F-110 class frigate

=== Cancelled Orders ===
Royal Canadian Navy

- 15 were originally planned for the River-class destroyer, but was cancelled and replaced with the BAE 5-inch/54-caliber Mark 45 naval gun.

== See also ==
- 5"/54 caliber Mark 45 gun
- H/PJ-38 130mm naval gun
- Otobreda 127/54 Compact
