= PR =

PR, P.R., Pr, pr, or Pr. may refer to:

== Arts, entertainment, and media ==
- P.R. (TV series), a Canadian television sitcom
- Partisan Review, a former political and literary journal
- Perry Rhodan, German science fiction series
- Power Rangers, an American television franchise based on Super Sentai
- Polskie Radio, Poland's national radio broadcasting organization

== Places ==
- PR postcode area, eleven postcode districts in UK
- Paraná (state), a state in Brazil (ISO 3166-2:BR)
- Parma, a city in Italy (ISO 3166-2:IT)
- Pasir Ris, a Singaporean town
- Puerto Rico, a Caribbean territory (ISO 3166-1:PR)
- Portuguese Republic

== Politics ==
- Pakatan Rakyat, an informal Malaysian political coalition
- Party of Labour (Serbia) (Partija rada), a political party in Serbia
- Proportional representation, a property of some voting systems
- Radical Party of Chile (Partido Radical), 1863–1994
- Radical Party of Chile (2018) (Partido Radical de Chile)
- Republican Party of Albania, a political party in Albania

== Public relations ==
- Public relations, the professional maintenance of a favorable public image by an organisation or person
- Press release, a prepared statement given to the news media as a public-relations tool

== Religion ==
- Pastor, an ordained leader of a Christian congregation
- Rector (ecclesiastical), or permanens rector, of a parish

== Science, technology, and mathematics ==
=== Biology and medicine ===
- Partial Response, a component of Response Evaluation Criteria in Solid Tumors
- Pathogenesis-related proteins, produced by plants under pathogen attack
- Penicillium roqueforti
- Per rectum, a medical abbreviation meaning "administered rectally"
- PR interval, a measurement used in cardiology
- PR-104
- Progesterone receptor, a protein

=== Computing ===
- PR (complexity), a complexity class
- pr (Unix), Unix command to paginate or columnate files for printing
- Adobe Premiere Pro, software which uses "Pr" as its icon abbreviation
- Pagerank, a Google technology
- Performance Rating, a computing term by AMD
- Project Reality, series of video games
- Pull request, part of distributed version control
- Part of the YPbPr standard

=== Mathematics ===
- PR (complexity), a complexity class
- Pr(E), also P(E), the probability of an event E
- pr_{i}, a notation for the scalar projection onto the i-th component
- Positive-real function, in mathematics
- Proportional representation, a property of some voting systems

=== Other uses in science and technology ===
- Praseodymium, symbol Pr, a chemical element
- Prandtl number, in physics and engineering, typically denoted Pr
- Propyl radicals or groups, denoted Pr in organic chemistry

== Sports ==
- Personal record, an individual's best result in a particular event
- Pinch runner, in baseball
- Protected ranking, a method of ranking tennis players coming back from injury
- Punt returner, a position in American football

== Transportation ==
- Pakistan Railways (reporting mark PR)
- Polregio (formerly Przewozy Regionalne), a polish railway operator
- Park and ride, a type of car park with public transport connections
- Philippine Airlines (IATA airline designation PR)
- Poste restante, mail held for collection
- Brazil (aircraft registration prefix PR)

== Other uses ==
- Pakistan Rangers, a paramilitary force of Pakistan
- Parachute rigger, a former U.S. Navy rank
- Permanent residency
- Princess Royal (disambiguation)
- Product return
- Professor
- A US Navy hull classification symbol: Patrol river gunboat (PR)
- PR, in linguistics, glossing abbreviation for present tense
- Platonic relationship

== See also ==
- P&R (disambiguation)
