= Royal Princess =

Royal Princess may refer to:

== Ships ==
- Any number of a list of ships named Royal Princess

=== Princess Cruises ships ===
Royal Princess is a name carried by several ships operated by Princess Cruises:

- MV Artania, in service as Royal Princess from 1984 to 2005
- Azamara Pursuit, in service as Royal Princess from 2007 until 2011
- Royal Princess (2012)

== Other uses ==
- A princess who is of a kingly ruling house in power, as opposed to a princess of a pretender house, a princess of an imperial dynasty or celebrity princess
- Dusit International, operator of Thai hotels named "Royal Princess"

== See also ==
- Princess Royal (disambiguation)
- Regal Princess
- Princess (disambiguation)
- Royal (disambiguation)
