= Enchanted Princess =

Cruise ship

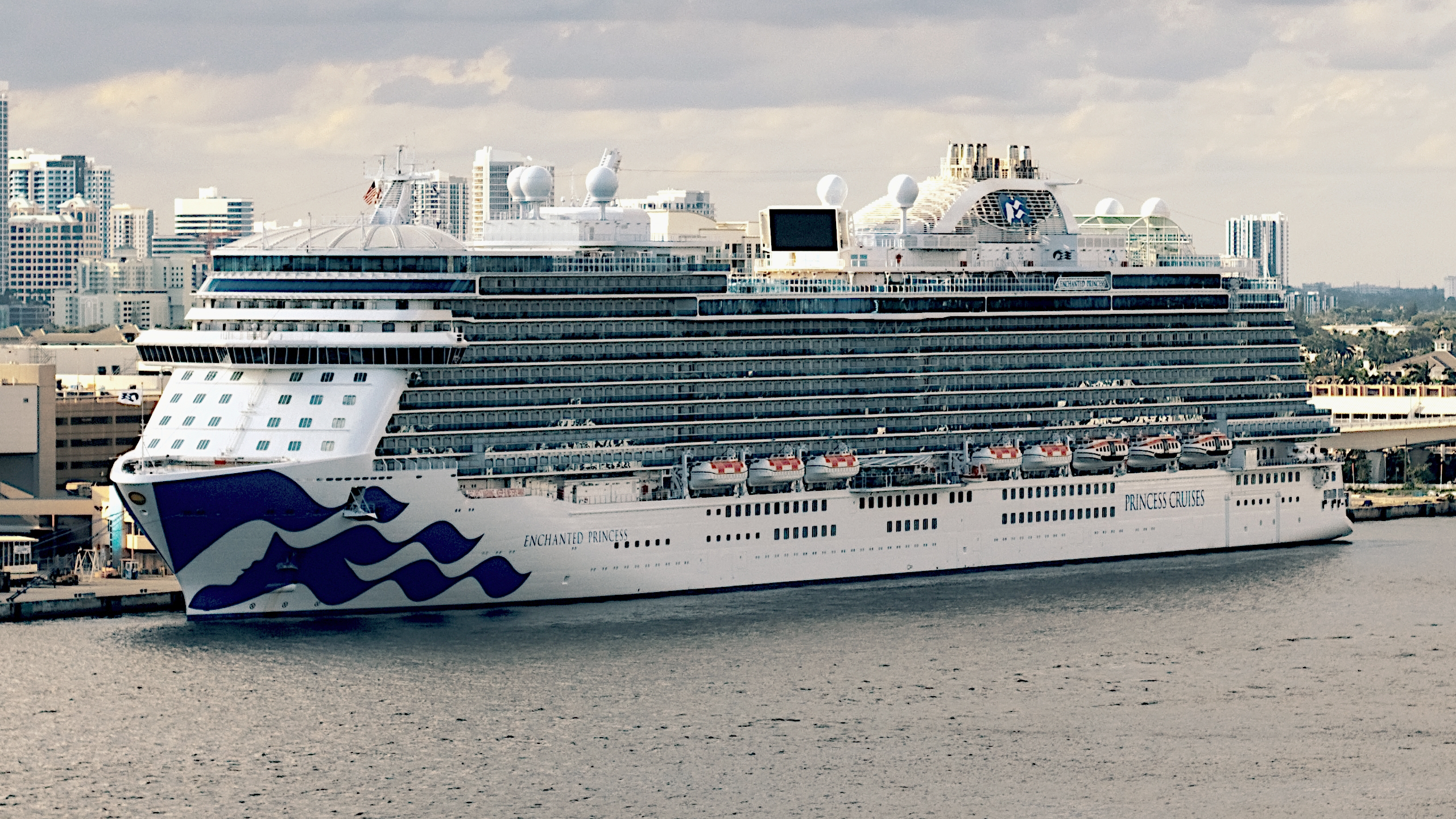
- Enchanted Princess at Port Everglades, 2021

History

Bermuda
- Name: Enchanted Princess
- Owner: Carnival Corporation & plc
- Operator: Princess Cruises
- Port of registry: Hamilton, Bermuda
- Ordered: 2 April 2016
- Builder: Fincantieri; Monfalcone, Italy
- Yard number: 6275
- Laid down: 14 February 2019
- Launched: 6 August 2019
- Sponsored by: Jenifer Austin; Lynn Danaher; Vicki Ferrini
- Completed: 30 September 2020
- Acquired: 30 September 2020
- Maiden voyage: 10 November 2021
- In service: 2021–present
- Identification: Call sign: ZCEW2; IMO number: 9807126; MMSI number: 310791000
- Status: In service

General characteristics
- Class & type: Royal-class cruise ship
- Tonnage: 145,281 GT
- Length: 329.92 m (1,082.4 ft)
- Beam: 38.4 m (126 ft)
- Draught: 8.6 m (28 ft)
- Depth: 11.348 m (37.23 ft)
- Decks: 19
- Installed power: 2 × Wärtsilä 12V46F Diesel generators producing 14,400 kW (19,300 hp) each; 2 × Wärtsilä 14V46F Diesel generators producing 16,800 kW (22,500 hp) each; Total Installed Power: 62,400 kW (83,700 hp)
- Propulsion: 2 × 18,000 kW (24,000 hp)
- Speed: 22 knots (41 km/h; 25 mph) (Service speed); 23 knots (43 km/h; 26 mph) (Maximum speed)
- Capacity: 3,660 passengers
- Crew: 1,346

Enchanted Princess is a Royal-class cruise ship operated by Princess Cruises, a subsidiary of Carnival Corporation & plc. Princess finalized the order for its fifth Royal-class ship in 2016 from Italian shipbuilder Fincantieri and her keel was laid down on 14 February 2019 in Monfalcone. Originally expected to be delivered in June 2020, the ship was hampered by construction delays after Fincantieri's operations were affected by the COVID-19 pandemic, and she was delivered three months later, on 30 September 2020. After a year-long pause in operations amid the pandemic's impact on tourism, Princess inaugurated the ship's operations on 10 November 2021, when she set sail on her maiden voyage.

== Design ==
Enchanted Princess measures 145,281 GT and has a length of 330.0 metres (1,082.7 ft), a draft of 8.49 metres (27.9 ft), and a beam of 38.4 metres (126 ft). She is powered by a diesel-electric genset system, with four total Wärtsilä engines, producing a total output of 62.4 megawatts (83,700 hp). Main propulsion is via two propellers, each driven by a 18 megawatts (24,000 hp) electric motor. The system gives the vessel a service speed of 21.9 knots (40.6 km/h; 25.2 mph) and a maximum speed of 23 knots (43 km/h; 26 mph). The ship houses 1,830 passenger cabins and 757 crew cabins. Of the 1,830 passenger cabins, 81% have a balcony. The ship has a maximum capacity of 5,800 passengers and crew.

On board, the ship includes many of the same modifications in accommodations and offerings first introduced on her sister ship, Sky Princess. Among the shared features include a new suite accommodation category, but she also includes new restaurants and revised interior décor in select venues.

== Construction ==
Carnival Corporation first entered into a strategic agreement with Fincantieri in March 2015 for five cruise ships scheduled for delivery between 2019 and 2022. From this agreement, the contract for a then-unnamed, fifth Royal-class vessel was finalized for Princess on 2 April 2016. Initial reports stated that she would measure approximately 145,000 GT and have a capacity of 3,660 passengers. On 20 August 2018, Princess announced that its fifth Royal-class ship would be named Enchanted Princess.

On 14 February 2019, the keel was laid at the shipyard in Monfalcone. She was then floated out on 6 August 2019 with a dedication performed by Fincantieri employee Marinella Cossu before Princess Cruises celebrated a separate ceremony on 17 September 2019, with Filipino Princess crew recruiter and trainer Doris Magsaysay Ho performing the honors.

In April 2020, Princess announced that Fincantieri had temporarily closed its shipyards for six weeks amid the national outbreak of the COVID-19 pandemic in Italy, which resulted in delays affecting the ship's construction and delivery timeline. After construction resumed, she began her sea trials on 13 June 2020, sailing from Monfalcone to Palermo. She remained in Palermo until 26 June before returning to Monfalcone on 29 June. On 8 July 2020, she successfully completed her sea trials. Enchanted Princess was originally scheduled to debut on 15 June 2020 but delays caused the ship to be delivered three months later on 30 September 2020 in Monfalcone. Upon her delivery, she also became the 100th passenger vessel constructed by Fincantieri.

In November 2021, Princess named three women from The Explorers Club as the godmothers to christen the vessel: Lynn Danaher, Vicki Ferrini, and Jenifer Austin. Princess released a taped production that was streamed on 13 December 2021, during which the three godmothers named Enchanted Princess.

== Service history ==
Enchanted Princess was scheduled to debut on 15 June 2020 on a pre-inaugural Mediterranean sailing from Rome to Southampton on 19 June 2020 prior to her christening on 30 June 2020 in Southampton. However, amid the COVID-19 pandemic, Princess ceased operations through summer 2021, effectively cancelling the ship's debut year in Europe and the Caribbean. The ship sailed her maiden voyage on 10 November 2021 from Port Everglades, with calls at Princess Cays, St. Thomas, Dominica, Curaçao, and Aruba.
