= PRH =

PRH can refer to:

== Places ==
- Princess Royal Hospital (disambiguation), several different hospitals in England
- Penrhyndeudraeth railway station, north Wales (by CRS code)
- Phrae Airport, northern Thailand (by IATA code)

== Other uses ==
- Partido Revolucionario Hondureño (Honduran Revolutionary Party), 1961–1993
- Penguin Random House, an Anglo-America publisher
- People's Republic of Haven, a fictional place in the Honorverse novels by David Weber
