= Princess Royal (disambiguation) =

Princess Royal is a title awarded by a British monarch to his or her eldest daughter.

Princess Royal may also refer to:

== Titles ==
- Princess Royal of Portugal
- Princess Royal of Thailand, see Maha Chakri Sirindhorn, Princess Royal of Thailand
- Princess Royal of Tonga, see Salote Mafileʻo Pilolevu Tuita, Princess Royal of Tonga
- Princess Royal of Jordan, see Basma bint Talal, Princess Royal of Jordan

== Transport ==
- Princess Royal, a GWR 3031 Class locomotive used on the Great Western Railway
- LMS Princess Royal Class, a type of express passenger locomotive built by the London Midland & Scottish Railway
- Princess Royal (ship), several ships

== Other uses ==
- Princess Royal, Western Australia, an abandoned town
- Princess Royal Hospital (disambiguation), various hospitals in England
- an English traditional folk tune known for having multiple Morris Dances set to it; see Arethusa (nymph) § In music

== See also ==
- Madame Royale, a style customarily used for the eldest living unmarried daughter of a reigning French monarch
- Prince Royal (disambiguation), a title similar to that of Crown Prince
- Royal Princess (disambiguation)
- Princess (disambiguation)
- Royal (disambiguation)
