= Princess Royal (ship) =

Many ships have been named Princess Royal, including:

== United States Navy ==
- USS Princess Royal, a captured blockade runner, purchased in 1863 and sold in 1865.

== Merchant ships ==
- Princess Royal (1778 sloop), a British merchant sloop built in 1778 and captured by the Spanish at Nootka Sound in 1789.
- Princess Royal (1783 ship), of 596 tons (bm), launched at Liverpool in 1783. Made several slave trading voyages from West Africa to Havana before she stranded at Liverpool in 1789 and was condemned.
- Princess Royal (1790 ship), of 405 tons (bm), launched at Liverpool was a slaver that the French captured in 1795.
- Princess Royal (1794 ship), of 405 tons (bm), was launched in 1794 as a West Indiaman. She made one voyage for the British East India Company (EIC), and two transporting convicts to Australia.
- Princess Royal (1802 ship) was launched in New York in 1799 or 1800, almost certainly under another name. She first appeared in British records in 1802. Between 1803 and 1808 she made four voyages as a Liverpool-based slave ship. After the end of British participation in the trans-Atlantic slave trade she became a merchantman. She was last listed in 1816.
- Princess Royal (1810 ship) was launched in 1787, probably at Parkgate, Cheshire, almost certainly under another name. Princess Royal first appeared in Lloyd's Register in 1810 and was lost later that year at Faial Island.
- Princess Royal (1861 steamship), a British blockade runner captured in 1863.
- Princess Royal (1907 steamship), a Canadian Pacific coastal steamer.
- RV The Princess Royal, a research vessel owned and operated by Newcastle University, United Kingdom.

== See also ==
- Post Office Packet Service for an account of the packet Princess Royal's successful resistance against a French privateer.
- Royal Princess (ship)
- Regal Princess (ship)
