= SS Princess Patricia =

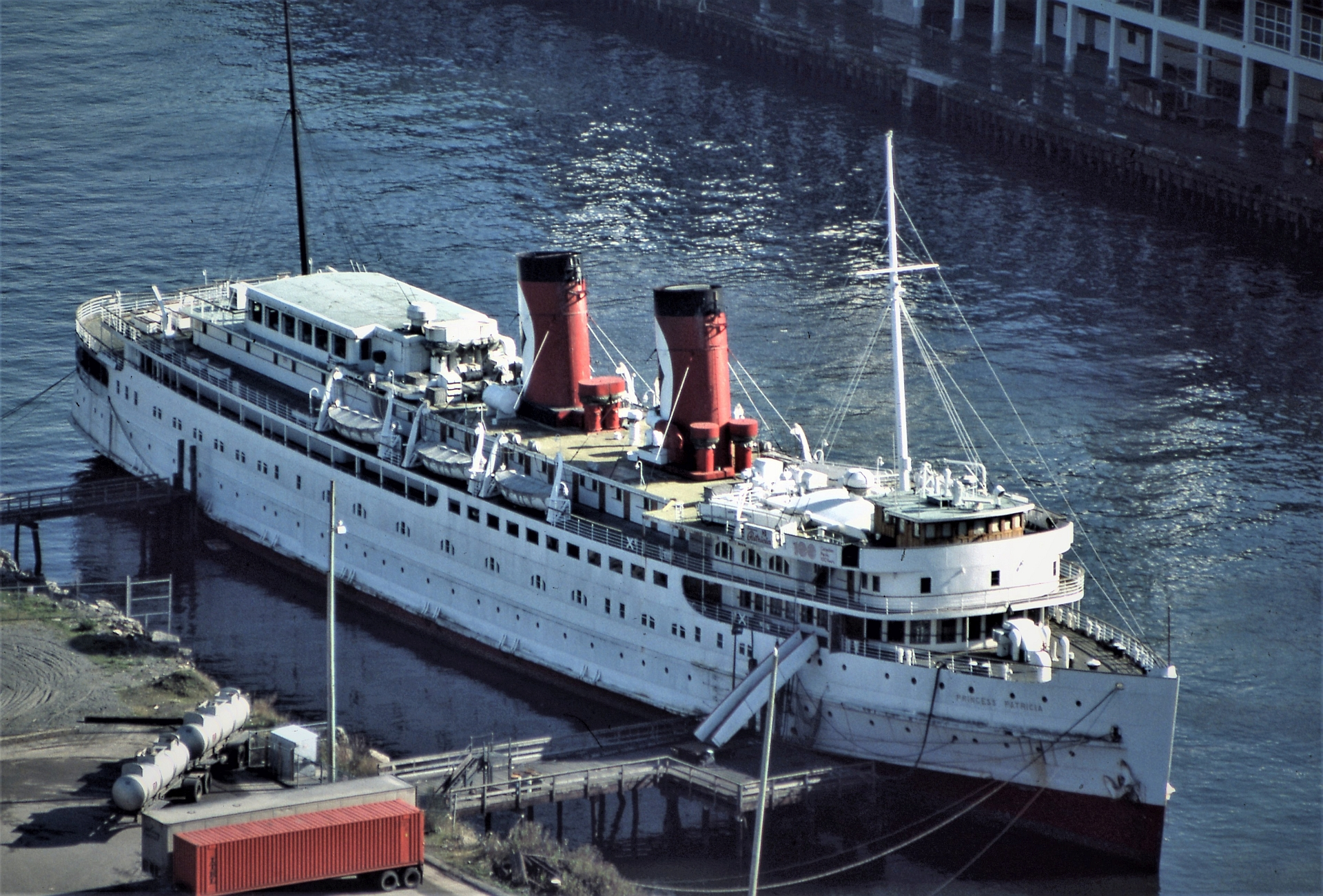
SS Princess Patricia at the CP Rail dock just west of Canada Place in September 1984. This is now the current site of Vancouver's Convention Centre West.

Princess Patricia was the first ship to operate for Princess Cruises, one of the largest cruise lines in the world. She was launched on 5 October 1948 and completed in May 1949 for the Canadian Pacific Railway. Stanley McDonald chartered the Canadian Pacific steamer in 1965. He intended to establish the winter cruising market by operating out of Los Angeles and cruising to Acapulco, Mexico. This is the period when Princess Patricia, which cruised to Alaska, would be laid up.

The second of Canadian Pacific Line's two 356 foot long, 56 foot wide, 5,611/6,062 ton (1963 refit) Fairfield Shipbuilding, Scotland-built west Pacific coast steam turbine passenger ships, Princess Patricia was named in 1949 for Princess Patricia of Connaught. She was retired from Alaskan cruising services in 1978, used as a floating hotel in Vancouver, British Columbia for the 1986 World's Fair.

SS Princess Patricia was used for filming locations for the 1989 film, Friday the 13th Part VIII: Jason Takes Manhattan, which was the eighth film in the Friday the 13th film franchise.

The ship arrived at Kaohsiung for breaking on 8 June 1989.
