= MV Discovery =

Cruise ship

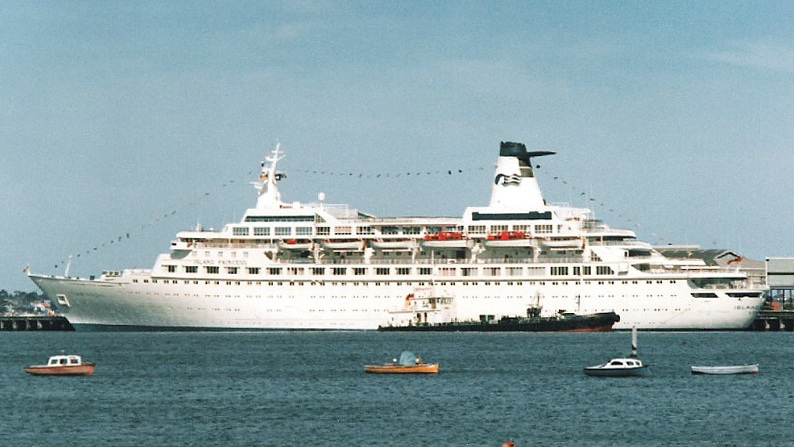
- Island Princess at Station Pier, Melbourne in 1986

History
- Name: 1971–1972: Island Venture; 1972–1999: Island Princess; 1999–2001: Hyundai Pungak; 2001–2002: Platinum; 2002–2014: Discovery; 2014: Amen
- Operator: 1971–1974: Flagship Cruises; 1972–1999: Princess Cruises; 1999–2001: Hyundai Merchant Marine; 2001–2002: Fiducia Shipping; 2002–2013: Voyages of Discovery; 2013–2014: Cruise & Maritime Voyages
- Port of registry: 1971–1974: Oslo Norway; 1974–1999: London, UK; 1999–2002: Panama, Panama; 2002–2014: Hamilton, Bermuda; 2014: Basseterre, Saint Kitts and Nevis
- Cost: $25 million
- Laid down: 1971
- Launched: 3 March 1971
- Christened: 14 December 1971
- Completed: 1972
- Maiden voyage: 1972
- In service: 1972
- Out of service: 2014
- Identification: IMO number: 7108514; Call sign: ZCDG2; MMSI number: 310382000
- Fate: Scrapped at Alang, India in 2014

General characteristics
- Type: Cruise ship
- Tonnage: 20,216 GT
- Length: 168.74 m (553 ft 7 in)
- Beam: 24.64 m (80 ft 10 in)
- Draught: 7.49 m (24 ft 7 in)
- Decks: 8 decks passenger accessible
- Propulsion: Three 10-cylinder, One 8 cylinder, GMT-Fiat diesel engines
- Speed: 18 knots (33 km/h; 21 mph) (service)
- Capacity: 698 passengers
- Crew: 350

MV Discovery (formerly Island Venture, Island Princess, Hyundai Pungak and Platinum) was a cruise ship, which was formerly operated by Voyages of Discovery and was last in service for Cruise & Maritime Voyages. She was scrapped at Alang, India in 2014.

== History ==
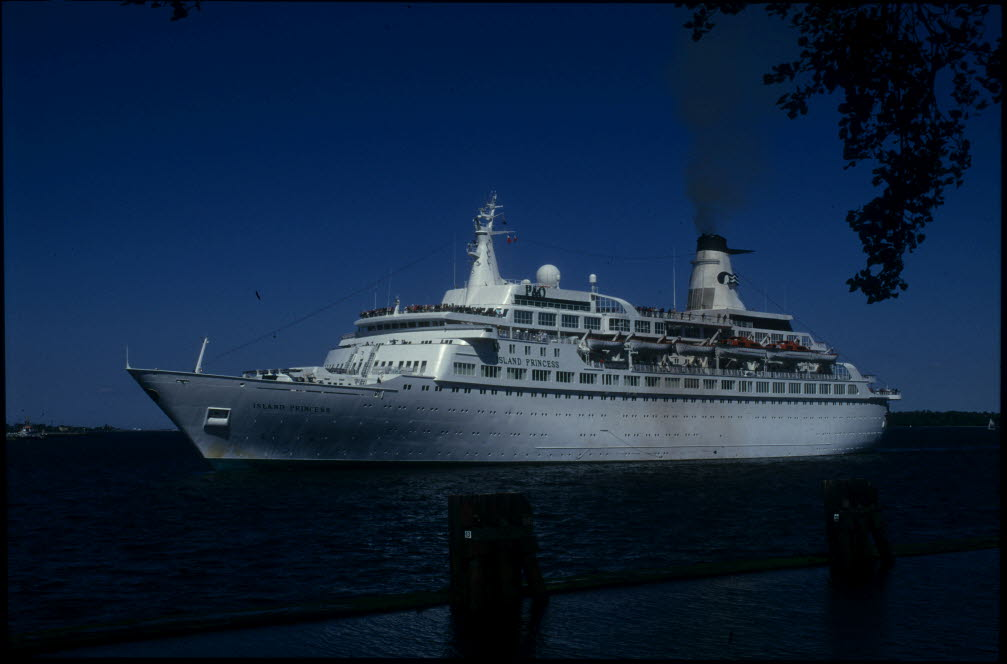
Island Princess

The ship began operation in 1972 with Flagship Cruises, under the name Island Venture. In 1974, she was sold to Princess Cruises along with sister ship Sea Venture. The pair were renamed Island Princess and Pacific Princess, the latter, laid up since 2008 at the San Giorgio del Porto shipyard in Genoa, Italy, was scrapped at Aliağa, Turkey. Both appeared in the 1970s television sitcom The Love Boat. Island Princess operated as part of the Princess fleet until 1999, when she was sold on to Hyundai Merchant Marine of South Korea. Renamed Hyundai Pungak her role was to transport South Korean pilgrims to religious sites in North Korea.

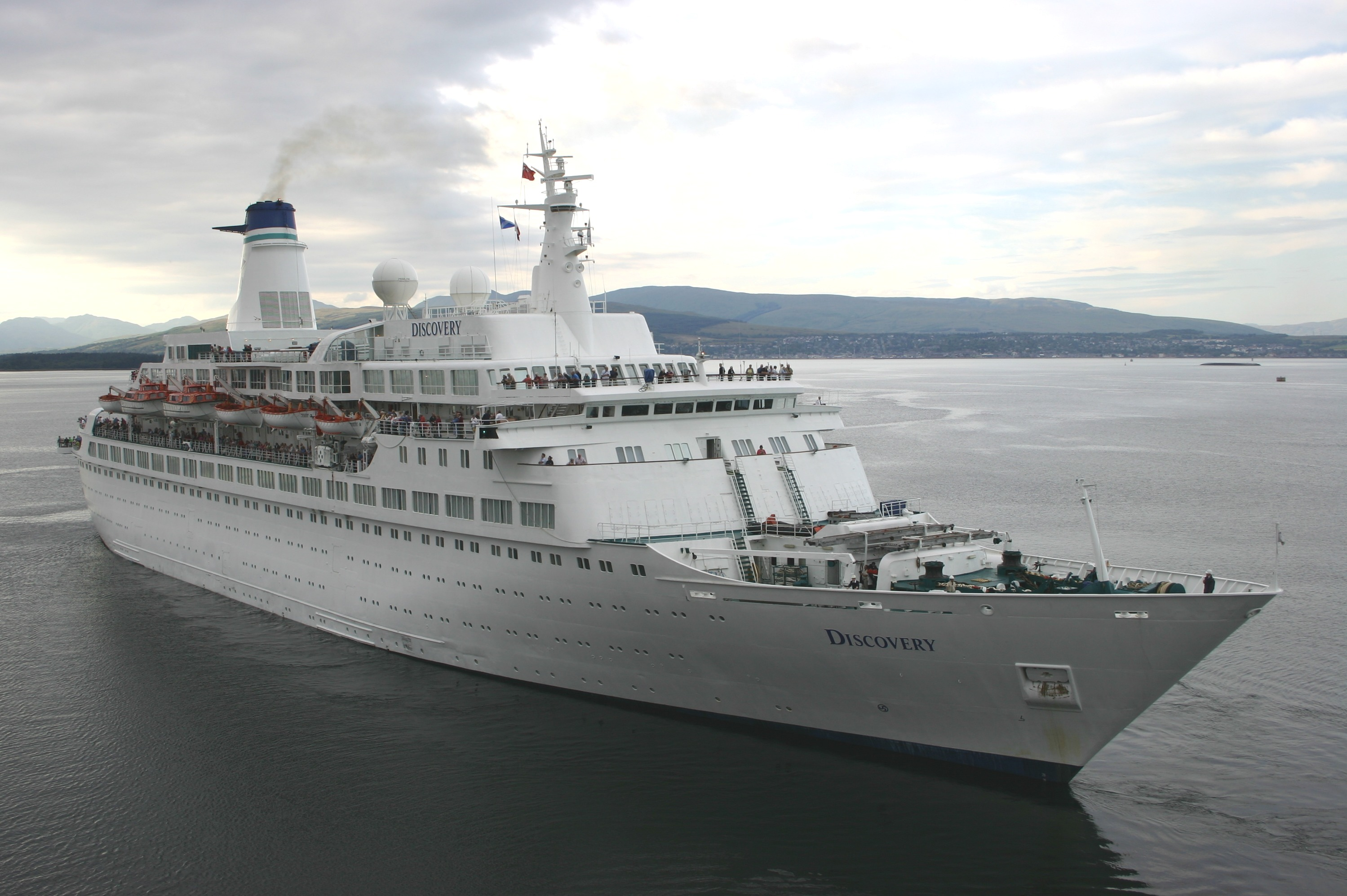
Discovery sailing from Greenock, 2014

After a brief stint as the Platinum, the ship went through a major refit between 2001 and 2003, after which the vessel sailed as Discovery under the care of the cruise company Voyages of Discovery, part of the All Leisure Group, cruising out of Harwich and Liverpool in England. Voyages of Discovery sold these cruises predominately to the British, American, Canadian, Australian, New Zealand and South African markets. For the most part Discovery could be found in the Baltic, Scandinavia, the Mediterranean and Aegean Sea, and North Africa from April through September (Spring and Summer in the Northern Hemisphere), and in South America, Antarctica, the Indian Ocean, India, and the Mediterranean from October through March (Spring and Summer in the Southern Hemisphere).

In February 2013, for 249 days, the Discovery sailed for Cruise & Maritime Voyages following a joint agreement with All Leisure Group, in which both companies would operate the ship.

From 2012 through 2013 the owners of Discovery replaced her under their Voyages of Discovery brand with the refurbished ship MV Voyager.

=== March 2013 Maritime and Coastguard Agency detention ===
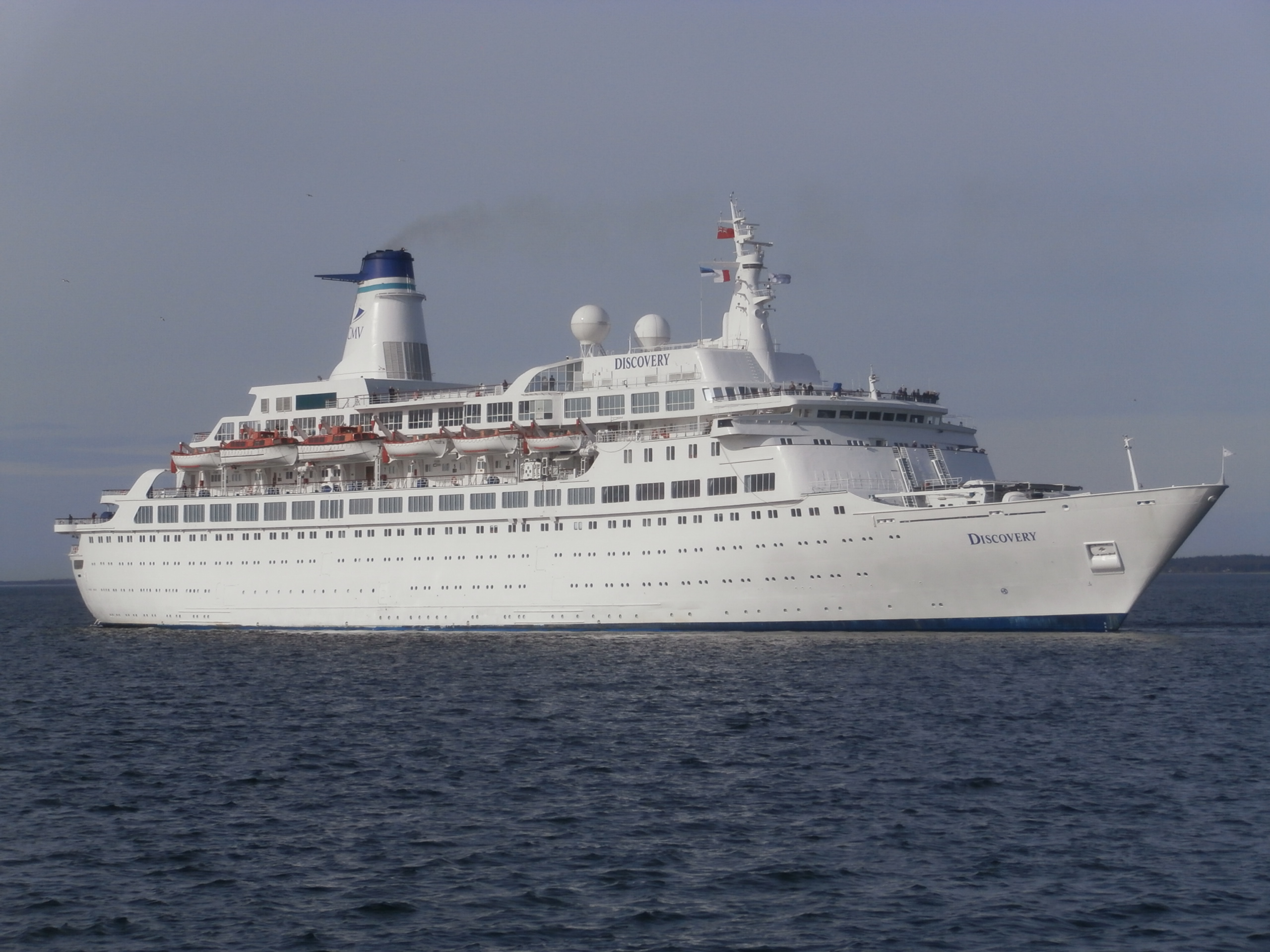
Discovery departing Tallinn, Estonia in 2014

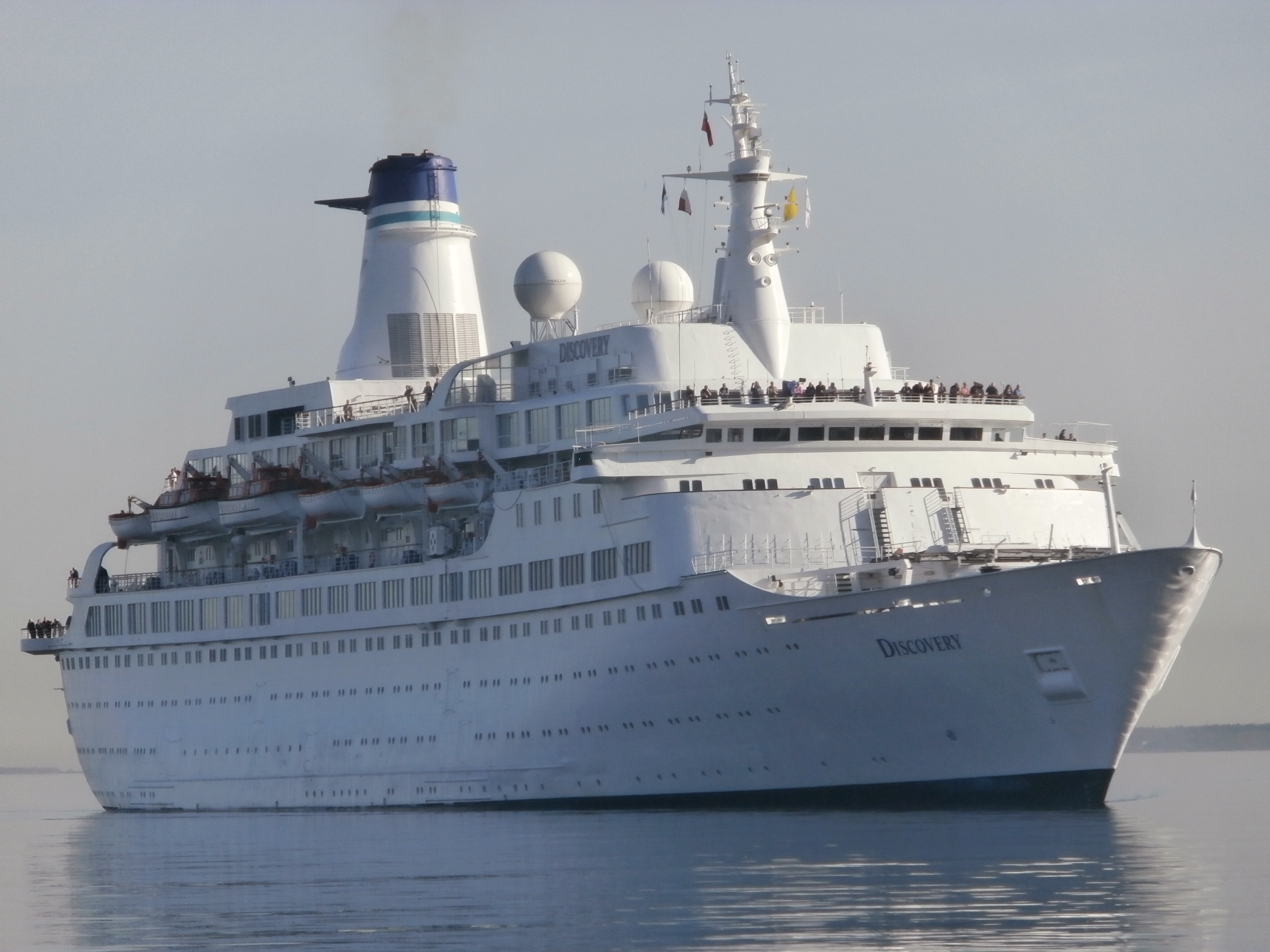
Discovery arriving at Tallinn in 2014

In early March 2013, on her maiden voyage with Cruise & Maritime Voyages, the Discovery was detained in Portland Harbour by the Maritime and Coastguard Agency after a recent routine inspection revealed that the ship's safety drills and crew's familiarisation of the vessel were inadequate. The cruise was cancelled after passengers spent around 24 hours aboard the ship, before leaving the vessel and boarding coaches out of the port. Afterwards, passengers expressed their anger about the cruise being cancelled but also about dirty wash areas and exposed electrics aboard the ship. Passengers were offered a full refund as well as £250 compensation and 40 percent off their next cruise with the company.

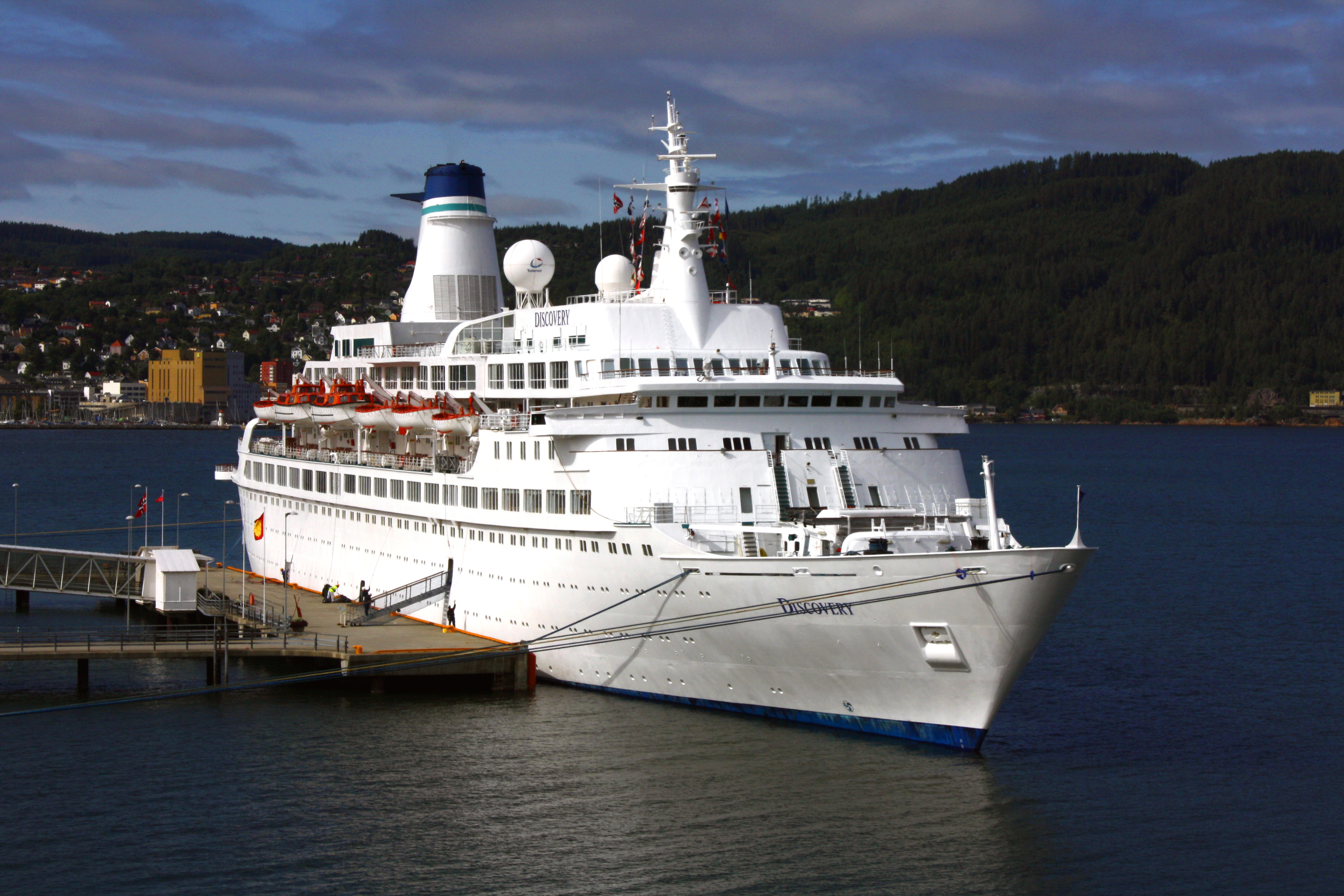
Discovery at Trondheim in 2009

Cruise and Maritime voyages issued a statement in response to the incident.

"Due to unusual and unforeseeable circumstances beyond our control and notwithstanding the recent dry-docking, the vessel has encountered technical problems which prevent her from sailing. We have been unable to resolve these technical issues to enable us to continue with the cruise on time and further works will have to be undertaken to ensure all issues are fully resolved.".

The ship was due to set sail from Avonmouth after arriving from Italy after refit but due to weather conditions it was diverted to Portland, with the passengers being brought to the port from Avonmouth by coach.

On 11 March 2013, Cruise and Maritime Voyages announced that the Maritime and Coastguard agency had cleared the ship for active service. The ship left on her second cruise with Cruise and Maritime Voyages on 15 March, from Avonmouth, the first cruise ship to do this in around 20 years.

=== Retirement ===
All Leisure Group took Discovery out of service in late 2014 due to operating losses. In mid-September, Discovery was sold by All Leisure Group "as is" for $5 million and her service with Cruise Maritime Voyages terminated two cruises early. For October she was replaced by Portuscale Cruises' Funchal and in 2015 was replaced by Azores. Discovery departed Bristol for the final time on 9 October 2014, bound to anchor off Falmouth for a few hours the day after. Following her brief anchorage off Falmouth, she sailed south to the Strait of Gibraltar. Upon entering the Mediterranean, she was reported to have been renamed AMEN and flagged in Saint Kitts & Nevis. She sailed directly towards Port Said and days later transited the Suez Canal. Discovery was broken up at Alang in 2014.

== General characteristics ==
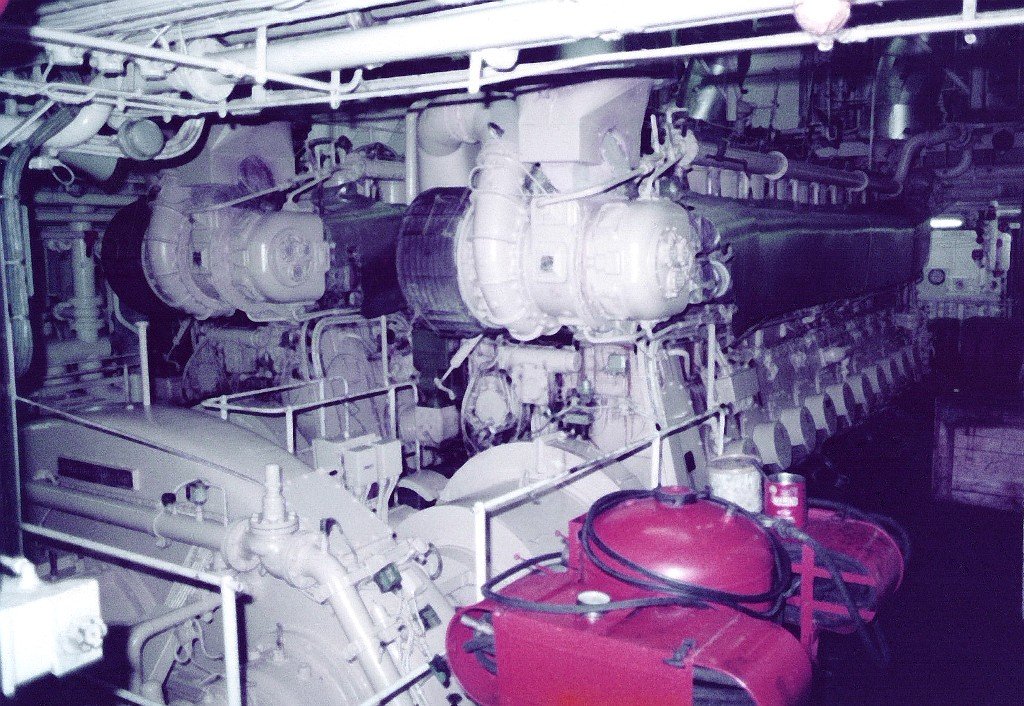
Two of the four Fiat C4210SS medium speed geared diesel engines on board Island Princess

The ship was 168.8 m (554 ft) long and 24.7 m (81 ft) beam, originally measured 19,910 GRT and was built at Nordseewerke, Germany. She could carry 646 passengers, and had a top speed of 21.5 knots (39.8 km/h). The Discovery Cruises website listed her gross tonnage as 20,186, top speed as 18 knots (33 km/h) and passenger capacity as 698. Propulsion was by four Fiat medium-speed diesel engines with a combined power output of 18,000 shaft horsepower. The engines were individually clutched and geared in pairs to each of the two shafts which drive controllable-pitch propellers. This arrangement enabled one or more engines to be shut down and de-clutched as required. The last registry was under the Saint Kitts and Nevis flag.

On board eight decks were open to the public: Sky Deck, Sun Deck, Bridge Deck, Promenade Deck, Riviera Deck, Pacific Deck, Bali Deck and Coral Deck.
