= Sky Princess (2019) =

Cruise ship operating for Princess Cruises

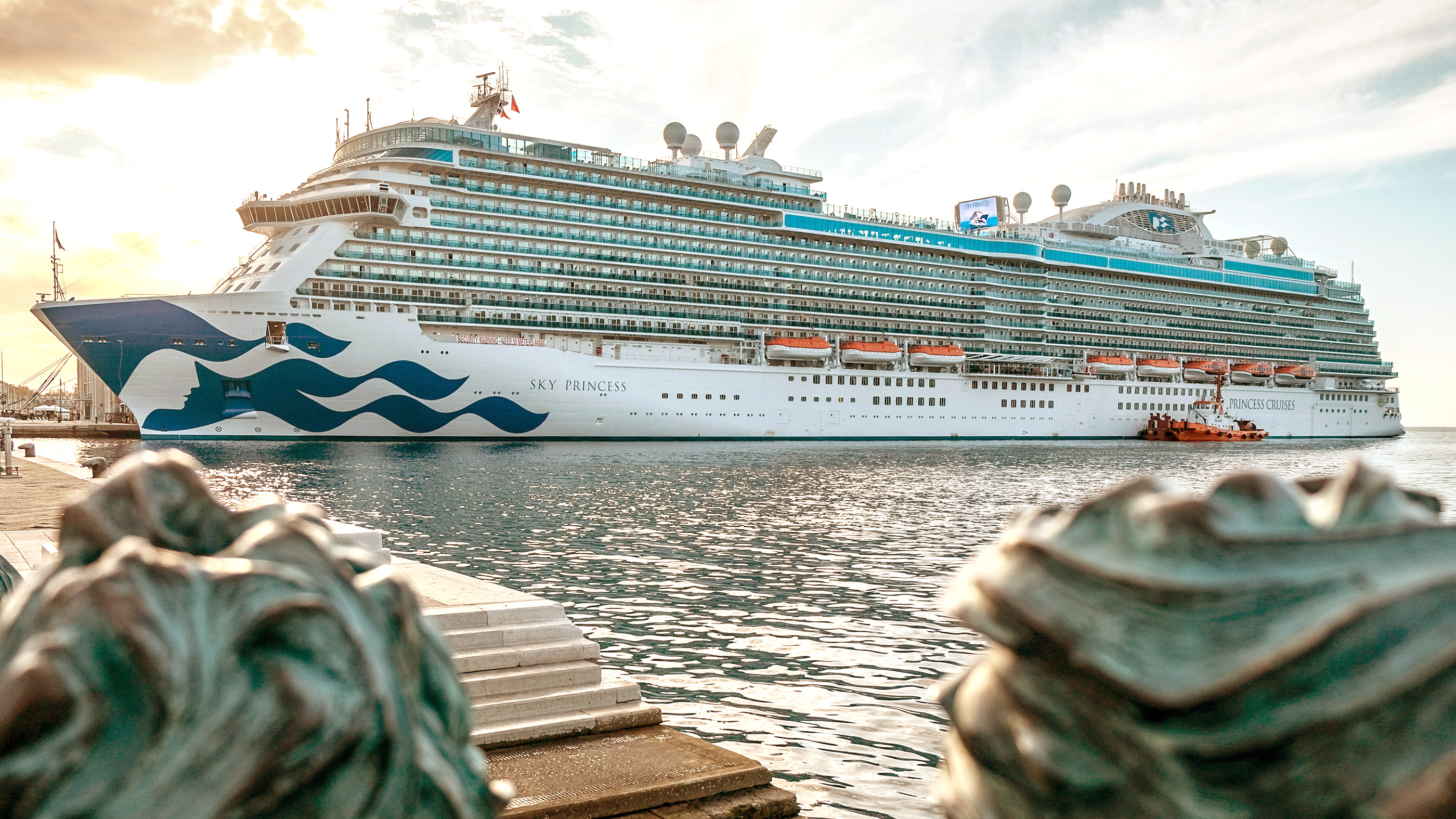
- Sky Princess in Trieste, October 2019

History

Bermuda
- Name: Sky Princess
- Owner: Carnival Corporation & plc
- Operator: Princess Cruises
- Port of registry: Hamilton, Bermuda
- Ordered: 30 December 2015
- Builder: Fincantieri; Monfalcone, Italy
- Yard number: 6268
- Laid down: 05 July 2018
- Launched: 14 February 2019
- Sponsored by: Kay Hire and Poppy Northcutt
- Christened: 7 December 2019
- Completed: 12 October 2019
- Acquired: 15 October 2019
- Maiden voyage: 20 October 2019
- In service: 2019–present
- Identification: Call sign: ZCEV9; IMO number: 9802396; MMSI number: 310780000
- Status: In service

General characteristics
- Class & type: Royal-class cruise ship
- Tonnage: 145,281 GT
- Length: 330 m (1,080 ft)
- Beam: 38.4 m (126 ft)
- Draught: 8.5 m (28 ft)
- Depth: 11.35 m (37.2 ft)
- Decks: 19
- Installed power: 2 × Wärtsilä 12V46F Diesel generators producing 14,400 kW (19,300 hp) each; 2 × Wärtsilä 14V46F Diesel generators producing 16,800 kW (22,500 hp) each; Total Installed Power: 62,400 kW (83,700 hp)
- Propulsion: 2 × 18,000 kW (24,000 hp)
- Speed: 22 knots (41 km/h; 25 mph) (Service speed); 23 knots (43 km/h; 26 mph) (Maximum speed)
- Capacity: 3,660 passengers
- Crew: 1,346

Sky Princess is a Royal-class cruise ship currently operated by Princess Cruises, a subsidiary of Carnival Corporation & plc. She is the second ship in the cruise line's history to sail under this name. She is the fourth Royal-class ship in the Princess fleet and commenced operations in October 2019. The ship measures 145,281 GT and has a capacity of 3,660 passengers.

== History ==
=== Planning and construction ===
Carnival Corporation first entered a strategic agreement with Fincantieri in March 2015 for five cruise ships for delivery between 2019 and 2022. From this agreement, the order for a then-unnamed, fourth Royal-class vessel was announced for Princess on 30 December 2015. The contract for this order was finalized on 2 April 2016. On 30 November 2017, Princess Cruises officially announced the name of the fourth Royal-class ship as Sky Princess, in honor of a previous Princess vessel that carried the same name.

Construction began on 9 November 2016 with the steel cutting for the ship's bow at Fincantieri's shipyard in Castellammare di Stabia, with a separate milestone on 8 September 2017 marking the steel-cutting for the rest of the ship at Fincantieri's shipyard in Monfalcone. Her keel-laying was performed on 5 July 2018. She was floated out on 14 February 2019 and completed her sea trials in September 2019.

=== Debut ===
Sky Princess was officially delivered on 15 October 2019 in her handover ceremony at Fincantieri's shipyard in Monfalcone.

The ship sailed a four-day pre-inaugural "shakedown" cruise for the press on 16 October 2019 from Trieste to Athens with a call in Kotor. She performed her official maiden voyage on 20 October 2019, a seven-day cruise sailing between Athens and Barcelona. She sailed a short inaugural season in the Mediterranean in fall 2019 before repositioning to her new homeport of Port Everglades in Fort Lauderdale, Florida, arriving on 1 December 2019. Due to high demand, two three-day inaugural cruises were scheduled on 1 December 2019 and 4 December 2019, with both cruising between Port Everglades and Princess Cays.

Sky Princess was christened at Port Everglades on 7 December 2019 by NASA astronaut and U.S. Navy Captain Kay Hire and NASA engineer Poppy Northcutt.

=== Operational career ===
During the winter months, Sky Princess sails in the Caribbean from Port Everglades. For the summer months, she sails in Europe, including the Baltic region. In the fall, she sails along the Maritimes and New England from New York.

== Design and specifications ==
Sky Princess measures 145,281 GT, has a length of 330.0 metres (1,082.7 ft), a draft of 8.49 metres (27.9 ft), and a beam of 38.4 metres (126 ft). She is powered by a diesel-electric genset system, with four total Wärtsilä engines, producing a total output of 62.4 megawatts (83,700 hp). Main propulsion is via two propellers, each driven by a 18 megawatts (24,000 hp) electric motor. The system gives the vessel a service speed of 21.9 knots (40.6 km/h; 25.2 mph) and a maximum speed of 23 knots (43 km/h; 26 mph). The ship houses 1,830 passenger cabins and 757 crew cabins. Of the 1,830 passenger cabins, 81% have a balcony. The ship has a maximum capacity of 5,800 passengers and crew.
