= List of ships named Royal Princess =

Several cruise ships have carried the name Royal Princess:

- MV Artania, in service as MV Royal Princess from 1984 until 2005
- Azamara Pursuit, in service as MV Royal Princess from 2007 until 2011
- Royal Princess (2012), launched in 2012

== See also ==
- Royal-class cruise ship, whose lead ship was Royal Princess
- Princess Royal (ship)
- Regal Princess (ship)
