= MS Pacific =

Cruise ship

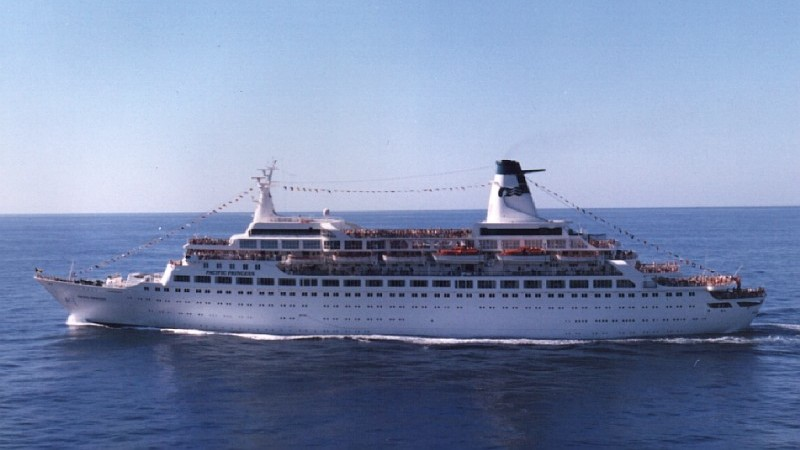
- Pacific Princess off the US West Coast in 1987

History
- Name: 1971–1975: Sea Venture; 1975–2002: Pacific Princess; 2002–2013: Pacific; 2013: Acif
- Owner: 1971–1975: Flagship Cruises; 1975–2002: Princess Cruises; 2002–2012: Viagens CVC; 2012–2014: CEMSAN
- Operator: 1971–1975: Flagship Cruises; 1975–2002: Princess Cruises; 2002–2008: Pullmantur Cruises/Viagens CVC; 2008: Quail Cruises
- Port of registry: 1971–1975: Oslo, Norway; 1975–2002: London, UK; 2002–2012: Nassau, Bahamas; 2012–2013: Lomé, Togo
- Builder: Nordseewerke, Emden, West Germany
- Cost: US$25 million
- Yard number: 411
- Launched: 9 May 1970
- Christened: 14 May 1971
- Completed: 1971
- Acquired: 14 May 1971
- Maiden voyage: 8 May 1971
- In service: June 1971
- Out of service: August 2013
- Identification: Call sign: C6SB5; IMO number: 7018563; MMSI number: 311245000
- Fate: Scrapped at Aliağa, Turkey in 2013

General characteristics (as built)
- Class & type: Cruise ship
- Tonnage: 19,903 GRT; 3,390 DWT
- Length: 167.74 m (550 ft 4 in)
- Beam: 24.59 m (80 ft 8 in)
- Draught: 7.40 m (24 ft 3 in)
- Installed power: 4 × Fiat C420,10SS; 13,240 kW (combined)
- Propulsion: 2 propellers
- Speed: 20 knots (37 km/h; 23 mph) (service); 21.5 knots (39.8 km/h; 24.7 mph) (maximum)
- Capacity: 626 passengers

General characteristics (as Pacific)
- Class & type: Cruise ship
- Tonnage: 20,636 GT
- Decks: 8
- Capacity: 640 passengers (lower berths); 750 (all berths)
- Crew: 350

MS Pacific was a cruise ship owned and operated by the Brazil-based Viagens CVC from 2002 to 2013. She was built for Flagship Cruises in 1971 by the company Nordseewerke in Emden, West Germany, and named Sea Venture. Between 1975 and 2002 she was owned by Princess Cruises named Pacific Princess.

Pacific Princess was one of the ships used in the TV series The Love Boat, airing from 1977 to 1986. Much of the 1980 book More Tales of the City by Armistead Maupin took place on board, and was later made into a miniseries, aired in 1998.

In 2008, Pacific was chartered by the newly established Quail Cruises to operate cruises out of Valencia, Spain, but was retired from service when renovation work proved more expensive than had been anticipated, and was sold in 2012 to a ship breaking company. After that sale fell through, she remained laid up in Genoa for an extended period before being towed to Aliağa where she arrived on 6 August 2013 for demolition. Before she was dismantled, on 10 August 2013, there was a fatal accident in which there was a flood in the compartment below the engines. While electrical pumps were operating, two men were killed and nine injured by toxic exhaust gases.

== History ==
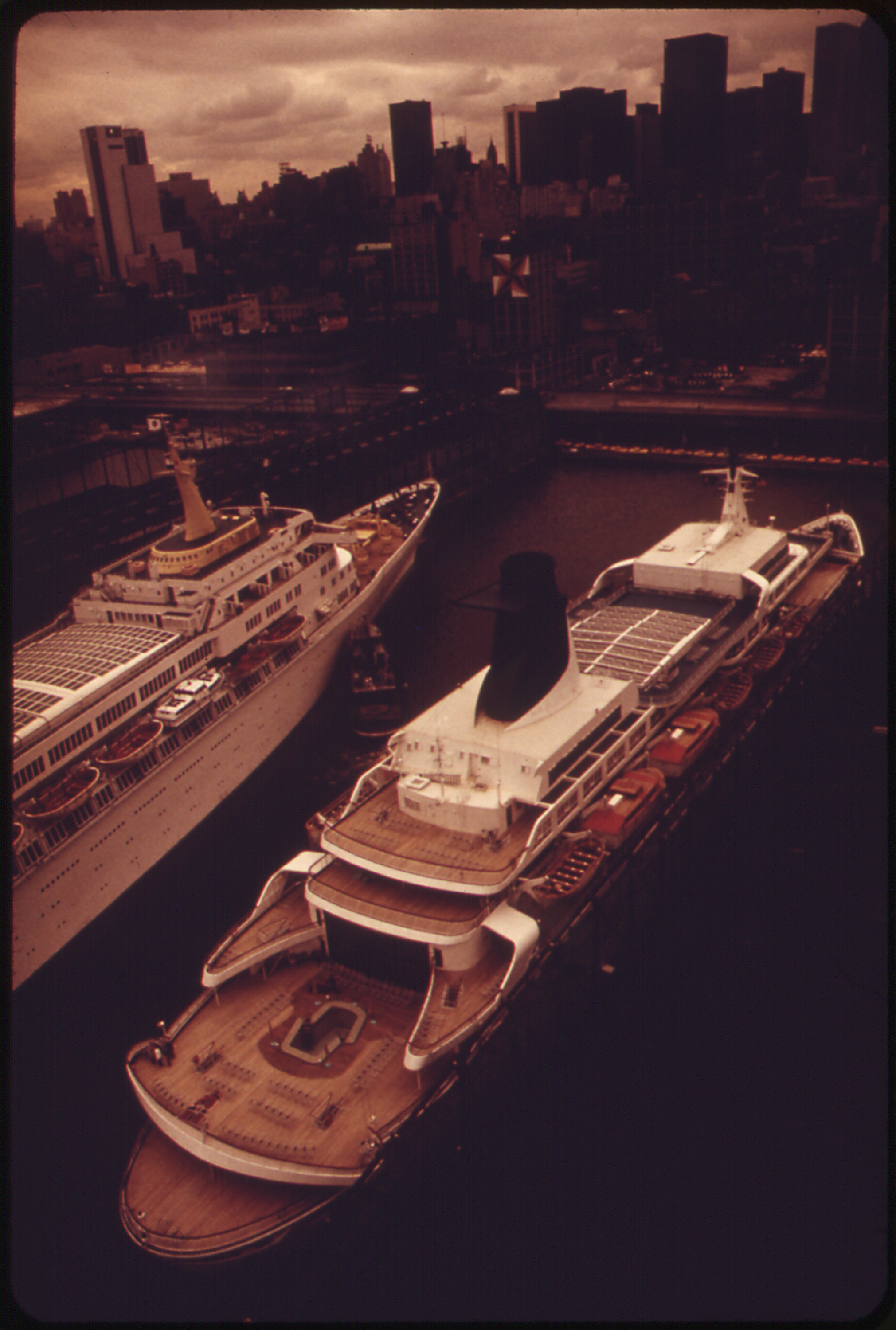
Sea Venture and Oceanic in New York Harbor

The ship began operation in 1971 with Flagship Cruises, under the name Sea Venture. She operated cruises between the United States and Bermuda, which had been settled by the survivors of the wreck of the original Sea Venture in 1609. As Sea Venture, she came to the rescue of Cunard's Queen Elizabeth 2, after the latter had major engine trouble in 1974.

In April 1975, she was sold to P&O's newly acquired Princess Cruises along with sister ship Island Venture. The pair were renamed Pacific Princess and Island Princess. Princess Cruises agreed to have their cruise ships featured in the TV series The Love Boat, which debuted in 1976 as a made-for-TV movie and as regular show in 1977. The ship featured in most of the episodes was Pacific Princess, although other ships also appeared, including Island Princess. The series, that was filmed primarily on sets in a production studio, was occasionally filmed aboard the actual vessels. The term "Love Boat" was heavily used by Princess Cruises in their marketing, and became synonymous with Pacific Princess. The success of the up-beat television show, which remained on the air until 1986, is largely credited with the increase in popularity of cruise ship travel in North America.

In 1998 Pacific Princess was impounded by police in Piraeus, Greece after 25 kg of heroin was found on board, smuggled by Filipino crewmen. According to police sources quoted in the BBC report at the time, there was evidence the ship had become a major tool for drug smugglers in the Mediterranean.

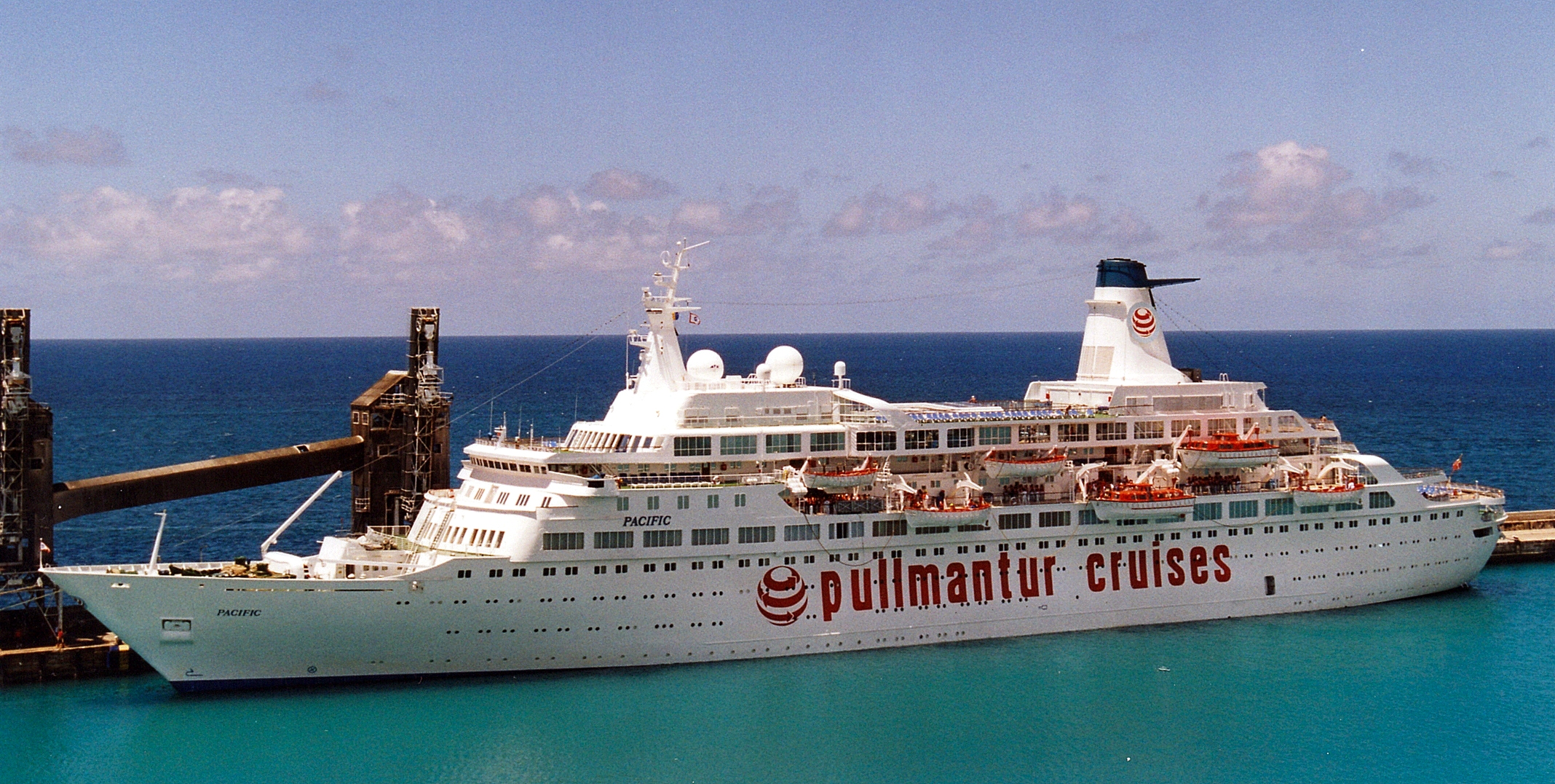
Pacific in Fort-de-France, 2004

Pacific Princess was sold in 2001, but was leased back and continued to operate as part of the Princess fleet until 2002, when the former Renaissance Cruises R3 replaced her and took her name.

Pacific Princess made her final voyage with Princess Cruises in October/November 2002, sailing from New York City to Rome, Italy. She then began operating for Pullmantur Cruises of Spain as Pacific, sailing in the Caribbean. Pacific was later chartered to and operated by CVC in Brazil during the Southern summer and by Quail Cruises in Spain during the Northern Summer.

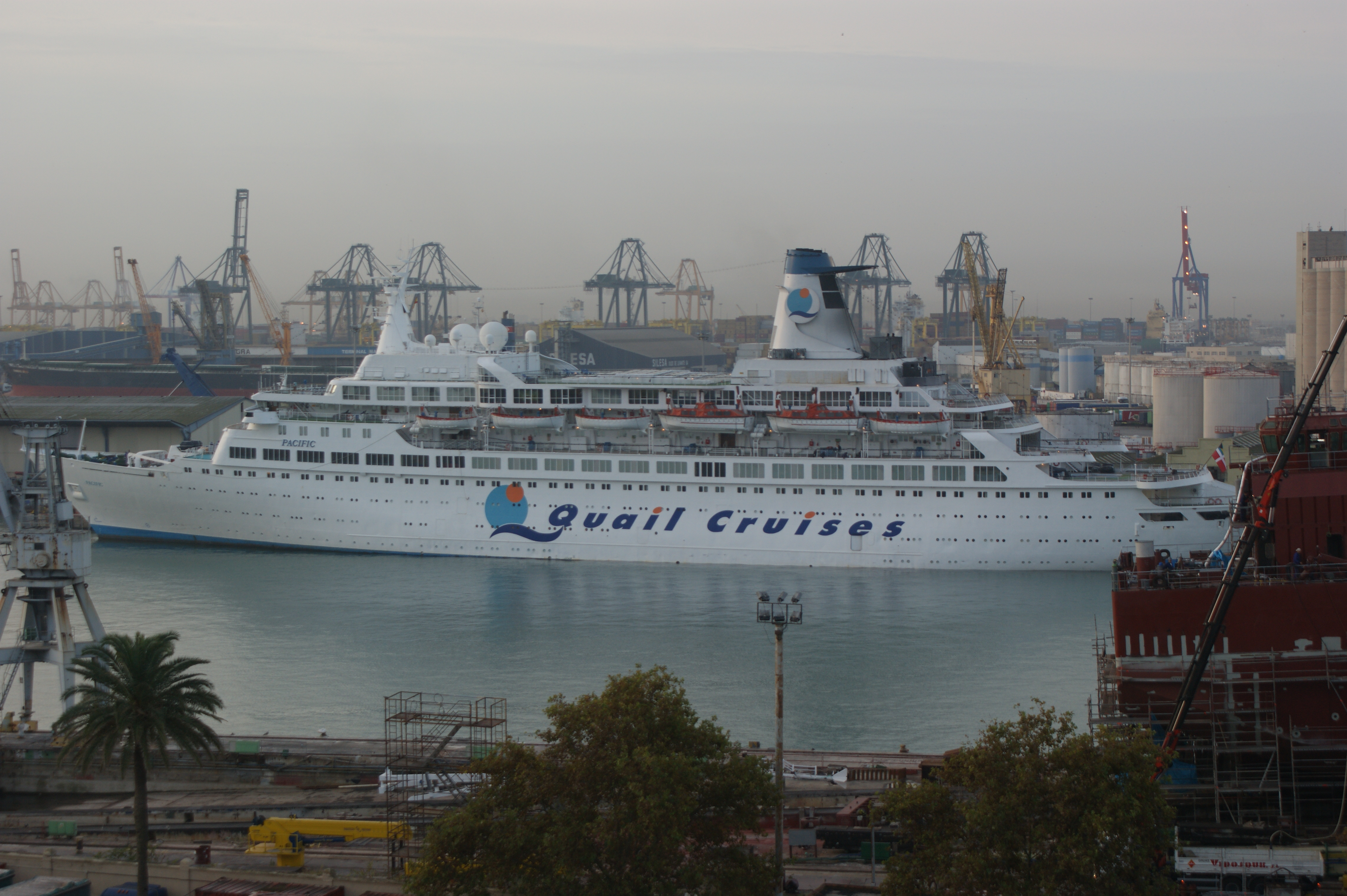
Pacific laid up after being seized by Italian authorities due to a failed safety test

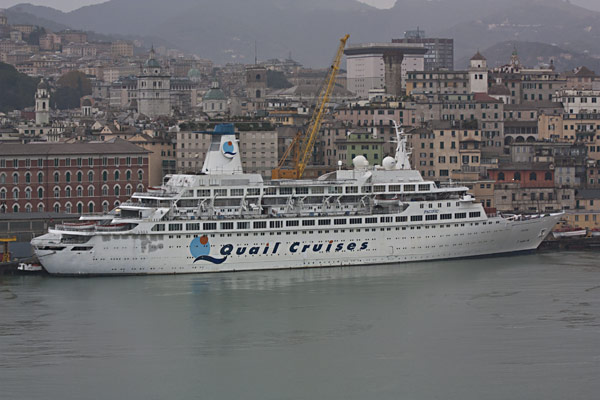
Pacific in 2011

=== Lien seizure and scrapping ===
Pacific was seized by the Italian Coast Guard in 2008 for a repair bill owed to Genoa's San Giorgio del Porto shipyard by her former owners Templeton International Inc. Quail Cruises claimed that the debt was much lower than initially reported, and had nothing to do with the ship's current operators.

In order to satisfy the debt, Italian authorities tried to sell Pacific at auction three times between 2010 and 2011, but no bids were received. In March 2012 the ship was sold for €2.5 million (about $3.3 million) to a ship breaking company, Cemsan Ship Breaker of İzmir, Turkey, but Cemsan defaulted on its payment and in May 2012 the ship once again went up for sale. Pacific Princess remained laid up in Genoa for several months, but on 27 July 2013 the ship was reported as being under tow for demolition. On 6 August 2013, she arrived in Aliağa to be dismantled by the İzmir Ship Recycling Company, which acquired her for €2.5 million. On 10 August 2013, two employees dismantling the ship died from the inhalation of toxic fumes, and an additional ten others were hospitalized. By February 2014, the ship was "half to two-thirds gone", and by late 2014 her scrapping was complete.

== Statistics ==
Pacific was 168.8 m (554 ft), with a 24.7 m (81 ft) beam, and was built at Nordseewerke, West Germany. She was propelled by four medium speed Fiat Diesel engines with a combined power output of 18,000 shaft horsepower. The engines were individually clutched and geared in pairs to each of the two shafts that drive controllable pitch propellers. This enabled one or more engines to be shut down and declutched as required. As Pacific Princess, her tonnage was 20,636 GT and she carried 646 passengers at a top speed of 21.5 knots (39.8 km/h; 24.7 mph), cruising at 20 knots (37 km/h; 23 mph). As Pacific, her capacity was increased to 780 passengers and cruising speed reduced to 18 knots. Country of registry was the Bahamas.
