= PR (complexity) =

PR is the complexity class of all primitive recursive functions—or, equivalently, the set of all formal languages that can be decided in time bounded by such a function. This includes addition, multiplication, exponentiation, tetration, etc.

The Ackermann function is an example of a function that is not primitive recursive, showing that PR is strictly contained in R (Cooper 2004:88).

On the other hand, we can "enumerate" any recursively enumerable set (see also its complexity class RE) by a primitive-recursive function in the following sense: given an input $(M, k)$, where $M$ is a Turing machine and $k$ is an integer, if $M$ halts within $k$ steps then output $M$; otherwise output nothing. Then the union of the outputs, over all possible inputs ($M$, $k$), is exactly the set of $M$ that halt.

PR strictly contains ELEMENTARY.

PR does not contain "PR-complete" problems (assuming, e.g., reductions that belong to ELEMENTARY).

== Hierarchy ==
The PR class can be divided into an infinite hierarchy of increasingly large complexity levels, according to the fast-growing hierarchy.

The $\text{F}_0$ class is the class of problems that can be solved in $n + O(1)$ time. That is, there exists a Turing machine and a constant $C$, such that given an input of length $n$, the machine solves it and halts within $n + C$ steps.

The $\text{F}_1$ class is the class of problems that can be solved in $\mathsf{poly}(n)$ time.

The $\text{F}_2$ class is ELEMENTARY.

The $\text{F}_3$ class is TOWER, which can be equivalently written as the class of problems that can be solved in tetration-time.

The union $\bigcup_{n \in \N} \text{F}_n$ is PR.

In practice, many problems that are not in PR but just beyond it are $\text{F}_\omega$-complete (Schmitz 2016).
