= Princess Royal (1802 ship) =

History

United Kingdom
- Name: Princess Royal
- Builder: New York
- Launched: 1799, or 1800
- Fate: Last listed in 1816

General characteristics
- Tons burthen: 133, or 135 (bm)
- Sail plan: Schooner, then brig
- Complement: 1803: 25; 1805: 25
- Armament: 1803: 14 × 6&12-pounder cannons; 1805: 14 × 6&12-pounder cannons; 1812: 2 × 6-pounder guns + 14 × 12-pounder carronades

Princess Royal was launched in New York in 1799 or 1800, almost certainly under another name. She first appeared in British records in 1802. between 1803 and 1808 she made four voyages as a Liverpool-based slave ship. After the end of British participation in the trans-Atlantic slave trade she became a merchantman. She was last listed in 1816.

== Career ==
Princess Royal first appeared in Lloyd's Register (LR) in 1802.

Year	Master	Owner	Trade	Source
1802	J.Harrison; J.Scott	Green & Co. W.Begg	Liverpool–Lisbon; Liverpool–Africa	LR
1803	J.Harrison; J.Scott	W.Begg	Liverpool–Africa	LR

1st slave trading voyage (1803–1804): Captain Joseph Scott acquired a letter of marque on 13 August 1803. He sailed from Liverpool on 14 September, bound for West Africa. Princess Royal arrived at Havana on 13 July 1804 with 147 slaves. She sailed for Liverpool on 10 August and arrived there on 8 October. She had sailed with 36 crew members and suffered no crew deaths on the voyage. At some point on the voyage after her arrival at Barbados her master had changed to John Pagen.

2nd slave trading voyage (1805–1806): Captain William Brinton acquired a letter of marque on5 January 1805. He sailed from Liverpool on 29 January 1805, bound for West Africa. Princess Royal arrived at Suriname on 19 July with 158 slaves. She sailed from Suriname on 31 October and arrived back at Liverpool 10 February 1806. She had left Liverpool with 34 crew members and suffered eight deaths on her voyage. She arrived with coffee, sugar, and cotton.

3rd slave trading voyage (1806–1807): Captain Brinton sailed from Liverpool on 23 May 1806, bound for the Congo River. Princess Royal arrived at Demerara on 24 October with 226 slaves. She left on 11 February 1807 and arrived back at Liverpool on 29 April 1807. She had left Liverpool with 28 crew members and she suffered no crew deaths on her voyage. She arrived with coffee, sugar, cotton, rum, and Madeira wine.

4th slave trading voyage (1806–1807): Captain Brinton sailed from Liverpool on 7 July 1807. The Act for the abolition of the slave trade had passed Parliament in March 1807 and took effect on 1 May 1807. However, Princess Royal must have received clearance to sail before the deadline. Thus, when she sailed from Liverpool on 7 July, she did so legally. On her way a gale off Cork caused her foretop mast to be sprung; she had to put back to Liverpool for repairs, arriving there on 20 July. Princess Royal gathered her slaves at Ambona, on the Angolan coast. She arrived at Berbice on 19 February 1808, and arrived back at Liverpool on 16 June. At some point on the voyage Captain Laughton replaced Briton as master.

The Register of Shipping for 1809 showed Princess Royal having undergone small repairs in 1808, presumably while beig converted back to regular trade from the slave trade.

Year	Master	Owner	Trade	Source
1809	W.Brinton	W.Begg	Liverpool–Coruna	LR
1811	W.Brinton; Boswell	W.Begg	Liverpool–Coruna	LR
1812	Boswell	J.Mills	Liverpool–New York	LR

Between the 1811 and 1812 issues of LR, Princess Royal underwent a change of owner, master, and trade, and her description changed from schooner to brig.

== Fate ==
Princess Royal was last listed in the Register of Shipping in 1815 and LR in 1816.
