= Stanley McDonald =

Canadian businessman (1920–2014)

Stanley B. McDonald (October 13, 1920 – November 20, 2014) was the founder of Princess Cruises, one of the largest cruise lines in the world.

== Career ==
Born in Alberta, Canada and educated at Roosevelt High School in Seattle and the University of Washington, Stan McDonald joined the United States Navy Air Corps.

After World War II, Stan McDonald founded Air Mac, a material handling business. Air Mac provided all the ground transportation equipment for the World's Fair in Seattle: McDonald also chartered a ship to bring visitors to the Fair.

In 1965, based on his experience from the World's Fair, he founded Princess Cruises which he expanded into one of the largest cruise lines in the world.

McDonald sold Air Mac to RCA in 1969 and Princess Cruises to P&O in 1975: he remained chairman of the latter business until 1980.

In 1977, together with two other partners, he purchased the real estate assets of Chrysler and subsequently formed Stellar International, a real estate business.

== Personal life ==
McDonald married Barbara in 1944: together they went on to have one son and one daughter. He died November 20, 2014, in Seattle, aged 94.
