= P&R =

P&R may refer to:

- P&R Publishing, Christian publishers
- Park and ride, car parks with connections to public transport
- Parks and Recreation, an American television comedy series
- Pastrami and rye, a popular sandwich combination
- Place and route
