= Princess Royal Hospital =

Princess Royal Hospital may refer to:

- Princess Royal Hospital, Telford, a teaching hospital located in Apley Castle, Telford, England
- Princess Royal Hospital, Haywards Heath, an acute, teaching, general hospital located in Haywards Heath, West Sussex, England
- Princess Royal University Hospital, in Farnborough, London Borough of Bromley
