= Princess Cruises =

Cruise line owned by Carnival Corporation & plc

- Logo as of 2020
- Type: Subsidiary
- Industry: Tourism
- Founded: 1965; 61 years ago
- Founder: Stanley McDonald
- Headquarters: 24305 Town Center Drive; Santa Clarita, California 91355
- Key people: Gustavo Antorcha (President)
- Services: Cruises
- Revenue: US$4.5 billion (2021)
- Number of employees: 30,000 (2021)
- Parent: Carnival Corporation
- Website: www.princess.com

Princess Cruises is an American cruise line owned by Carnival Corporation. The company is incorporated in Bermuda, and its headquarters are in Santa Clarita, California. As of 2025, it is the sixth largest cruise line by net revenue. It was previously a subsidiary of P&O Princess Cruises. The line has 17 ships cruising global itineraries that are marketed to both American and international passengers.

In the late 1970s and 1980s, Princess rose in prominence when American television series The Love Boat was set primarily on the brand's first Pacific Princess in its weekly episodes; the brand has since continued to invoke its connection to the series. Earlier, the first Sun Princess had featured prominently in the 1975 Columbo episode "Troubled Waters".

== History ==
=== 1965–1973: Early years ===
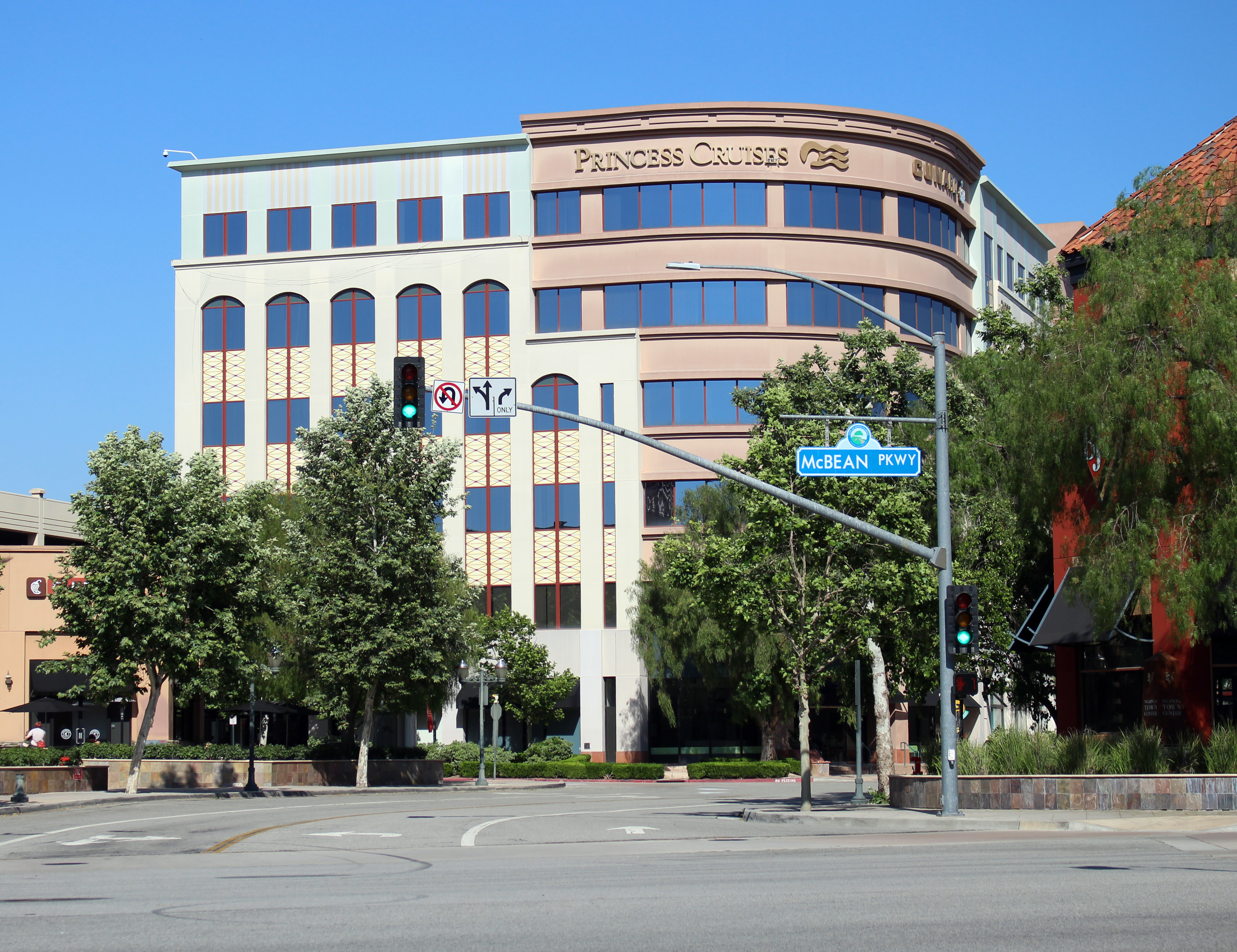
Princess Cruises headquarters in Santa Clarita

Princess Cruises began in 1965, when founder Stanley McDonald chartered Canadian Pacific Limited's Alaska cruise ship Princess Patricia for Mexican Riviera cruises from Los Angeles during a time when she would have usually been laid up for the winter. However, Princess Pat, as she was fondly called, had never been designed for tropical cruising, lacking air-conditioning, and Princess ended her charter in favor of a more purpose-built cruise ship, Italia.

Princess, who marketed the ship as Princess Italia, but never officially renamed her, used the ship to inaugurate their Mexican Riviera cruises out of Los Angeles. The ship did not receive the Princess logo on her funnel until 1967.

In 1969, Princess Italia was used on Alaskan cruises from San Francisco, but by 1973, the charter was canceled, and Italia returned to Europe on charter to Costa Cruise Line.

Princess's third charter ship was Costa's Carla C. Originally, Compagnie Générale Transatlantique's SS Flandre, the ship had been purchased by Costa in the late 1960s and given a major rebuilding. Almost immediately after completion, the ship was chartered to Princess, and it was on board the ship, which was marketed as, but again not officially renamed, Princess Carla, that Jeraldine Saunders wrote the first chapters of her nonfiction book The Love Boats.

=== 1974–1987: P&O acquires Princess ===
Britain's Peninsular & Oriental Steam Navigation Company (P&O), which by 1960 was the world's largest shipping company, with 320 oceangoing vessels, acquired Princess Cruise Lines in 1974 and their Spirit of London (originally to have been Norwegian Cruise Line's Seaward) was transferred to the Princess fleet, becoming the first Sun Princess.

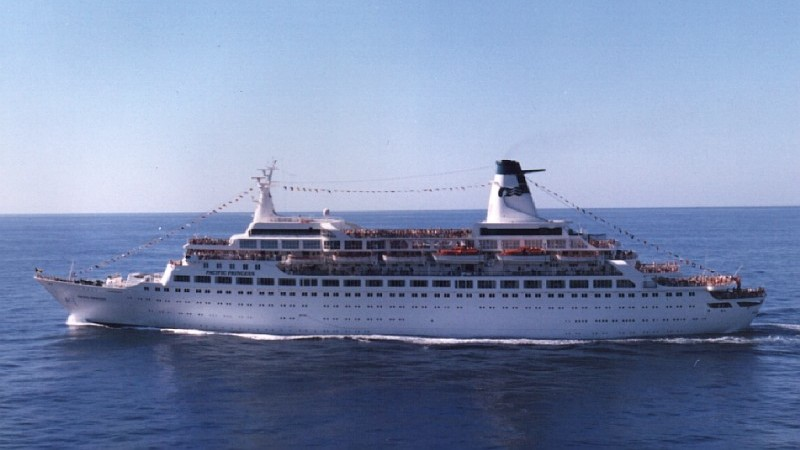
Pacific Princess (pictured in 1987) was purchased in 1974.

The two ships that were to be featured heavily in the television series The Love Boat were built in 1971 at Nordseewerke for Flagship Cruises and originally named the Sea Venture (for the original Sea Venture, the 1609 wreck of which resulted in the settlement of Bermuda) and Island Venture. In 1974, P&O purchased them for their Princess division, and they served as Pacific Princess and Island Princess respectively.

A part-time addition to the Princess fleet was the former Swedish transatlantic liner Kungsholm, purchased by P&O from Flagship Cruises in 1978, and then restyled and rebuilt in Bremen as Sea Princess. She was initially based in Australia as a P&O ship until 1981 when her role there was taken over by Oriana. After that, she alternated between P&O and Princess colours as she moved between fleets. Sea Princess returned to the P&O UK fleet permanently and in 1995 and was renamed MV Victoria to allow a then-new Princess ship to be named Sea Princess.

In 1981, Princess began calling at the cruise line's first private Caribbean destination, Palm Island in the Grenadines.

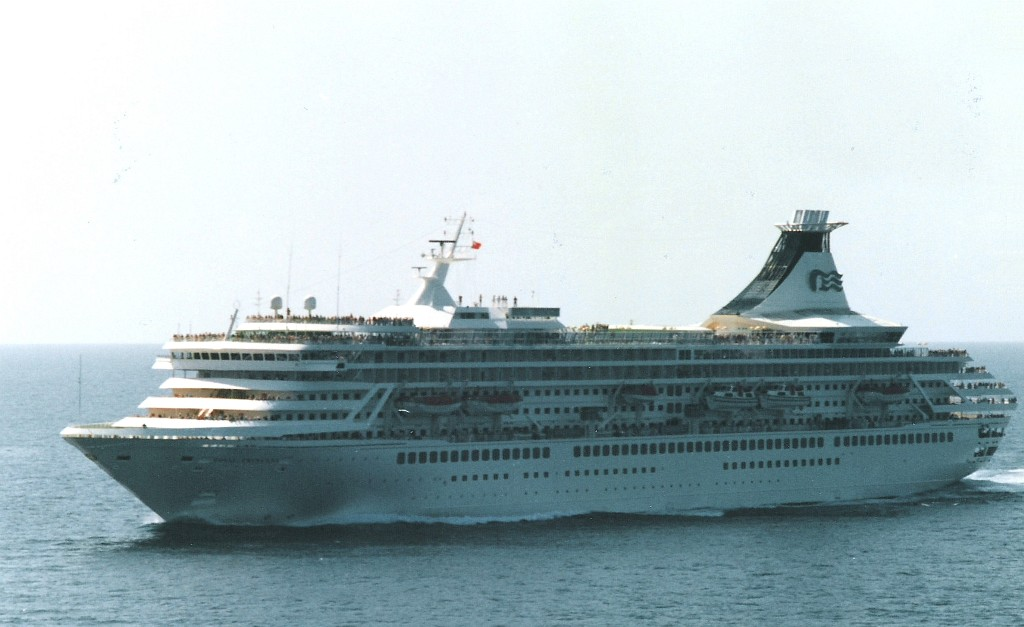
The 1984-built Royal Princess (pictured in 1987) was Princess's first purpose-built ship.

The first P&O Princess Cruises purpose-built cruise ship was Royal Princess, christened by Princess Diana in 1984, she was the largest new British passenger ship in a decade, and one of the first, if not the first, ships to completely dispense with interior cabins. The ship served in P&O Cruises fleet as Artemis until 2011.

In 1986, P&O Princess Cruises acquired Tour Alaska, which operated on the Alaska Railroad. Based in Anchorage, Alaska, Princess Tours now operates ten luxury railcars with full-service scenic tours of Denali (formerly Mount McKinley) and can accommodate over 700 passengers per day. That same year, Princess unveiled Princess Bay, located at Saline Bay on the Caribbean island of Mayreau. Princess Bay was the cruise line's second private island resort, replacing Palm Island, and was marketed as "every castaway's first choice," primarily featured on the cruise line's Caribbean itineraries from San Juan, Puerto Rico, but is now no longer a Princess private resort.

=== 1988–1994: Sitmar acquisition, Princess Cays ===
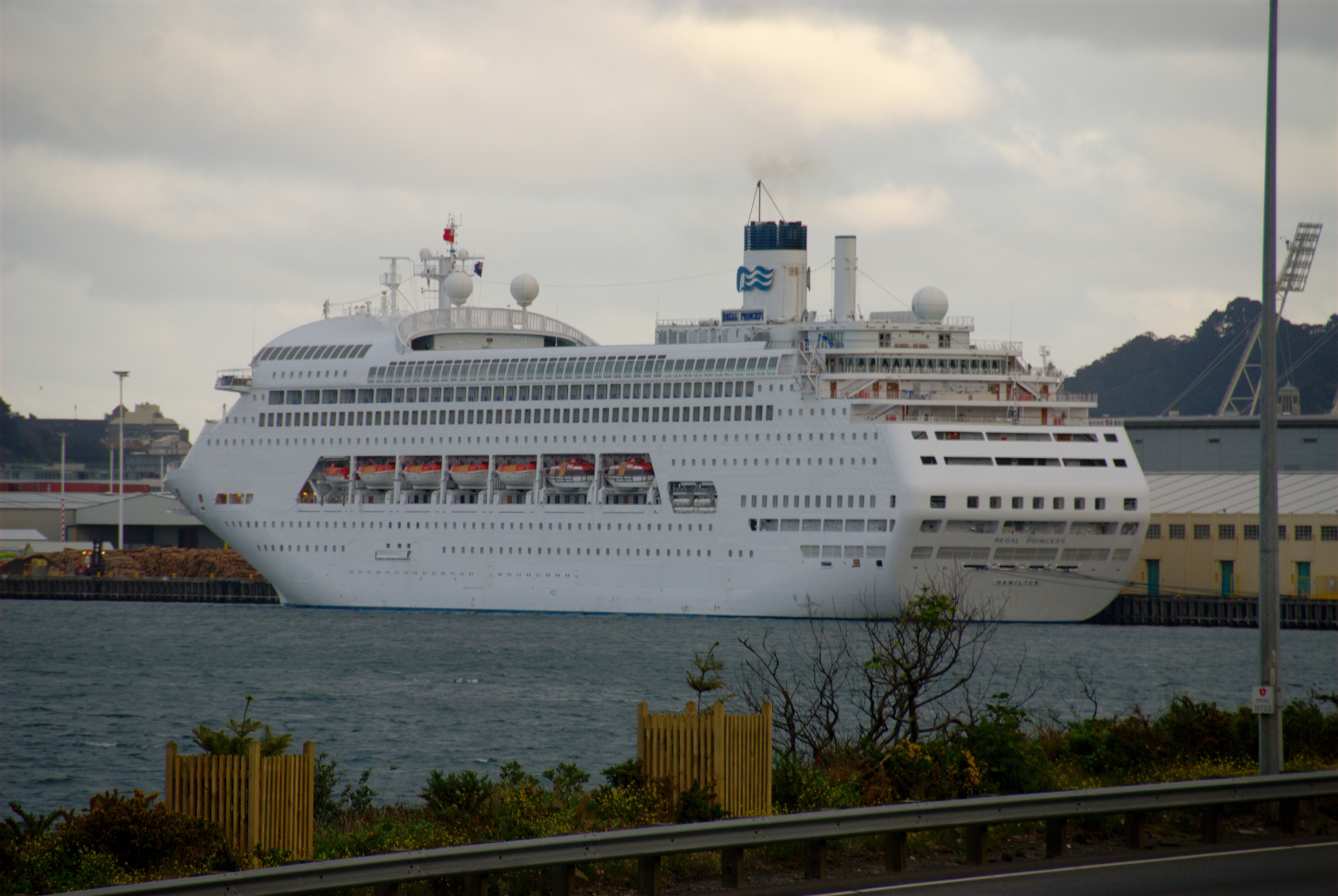
The 1990-built Regal Princess (pictured in 2007) was originally ordered for Sitmar Cruises.

P&O Princess Cruises acquired Sitmar Line in 1988 and transferred all of its major tonnage to Princess, including three cruise ships then under construction. Dawn Princess and Fair Princess were both ex-Cunard, and the former Sitmar Fairsky became Princess's Sky Princess. The first of the three new Sitmar ships came into the Princess brand in 1989 as Star Princess, the largest British exclusively cruising ship. Two 70,000 GT cruise ships designed originally by famed architect Renzo Piano entered service in 1990 as Crown Princess and Regal Princess, bringing Princess's fleet up to ten deluxe cruise ships. This greatly enlarged the Princess fleet by eventually adding six ships, making it a major competitor with the other Caribbean cruise lines.

==== Princess Cays ====
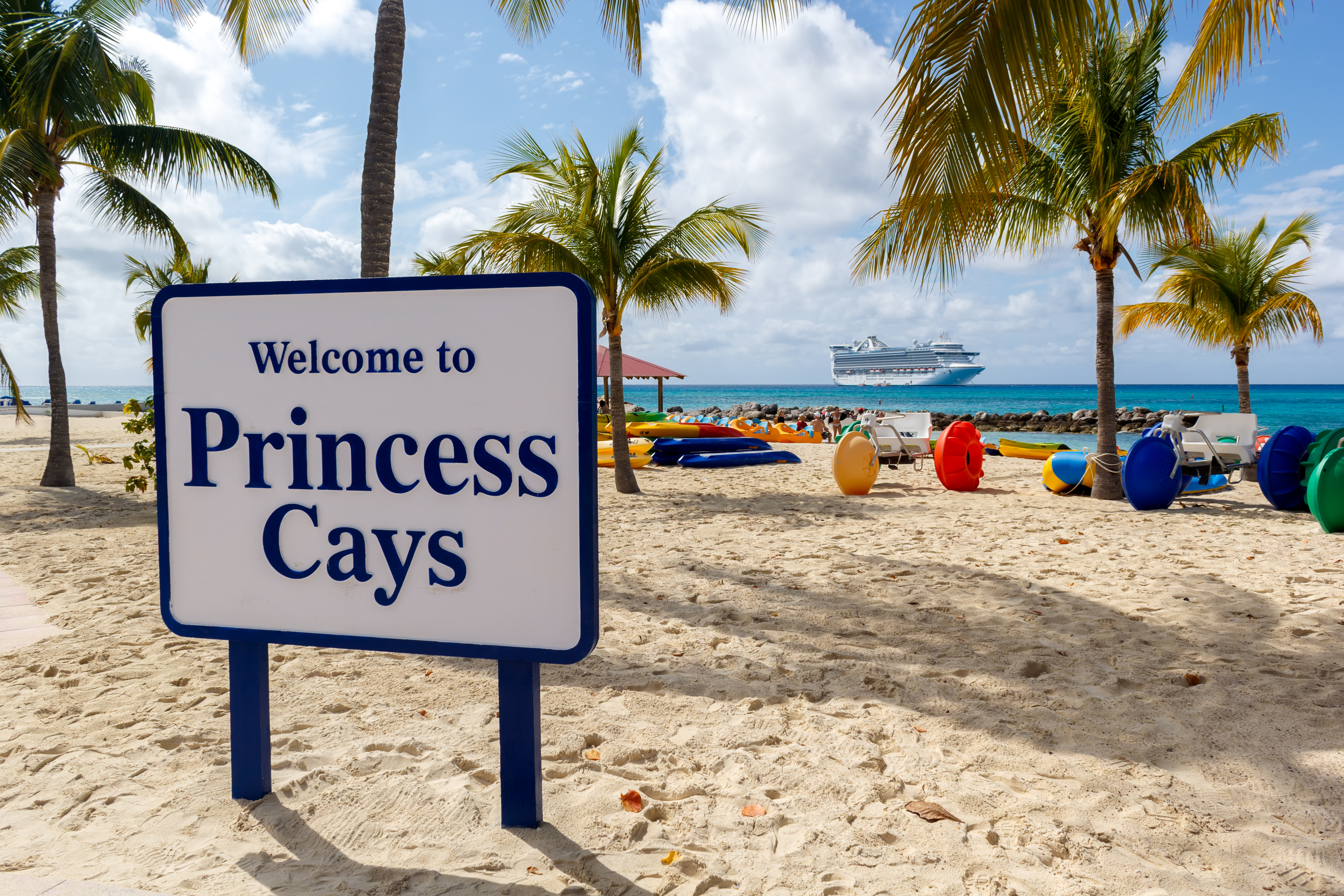
Princess began developing Princess Cays, its private island resort, in 1991.

In 1991, Princess Cruises began developing their third ever Caribbean private resort named Princess Cays located on the southern tip of the island of Eleuthera in the Bahamas. The development was reported to cost $1.2 million and was unveiled in 1992, becoming an exclusive port of call for the cruise line's Western Caribbean itineraries. The private destination is also shared between sister brands, Carnival Cruise Line and Holland America Line. The resort suffered from a fire in January 2019 that damaged several buildings along the south side of the island.

=== 1995–1999: Fleet modernization ===
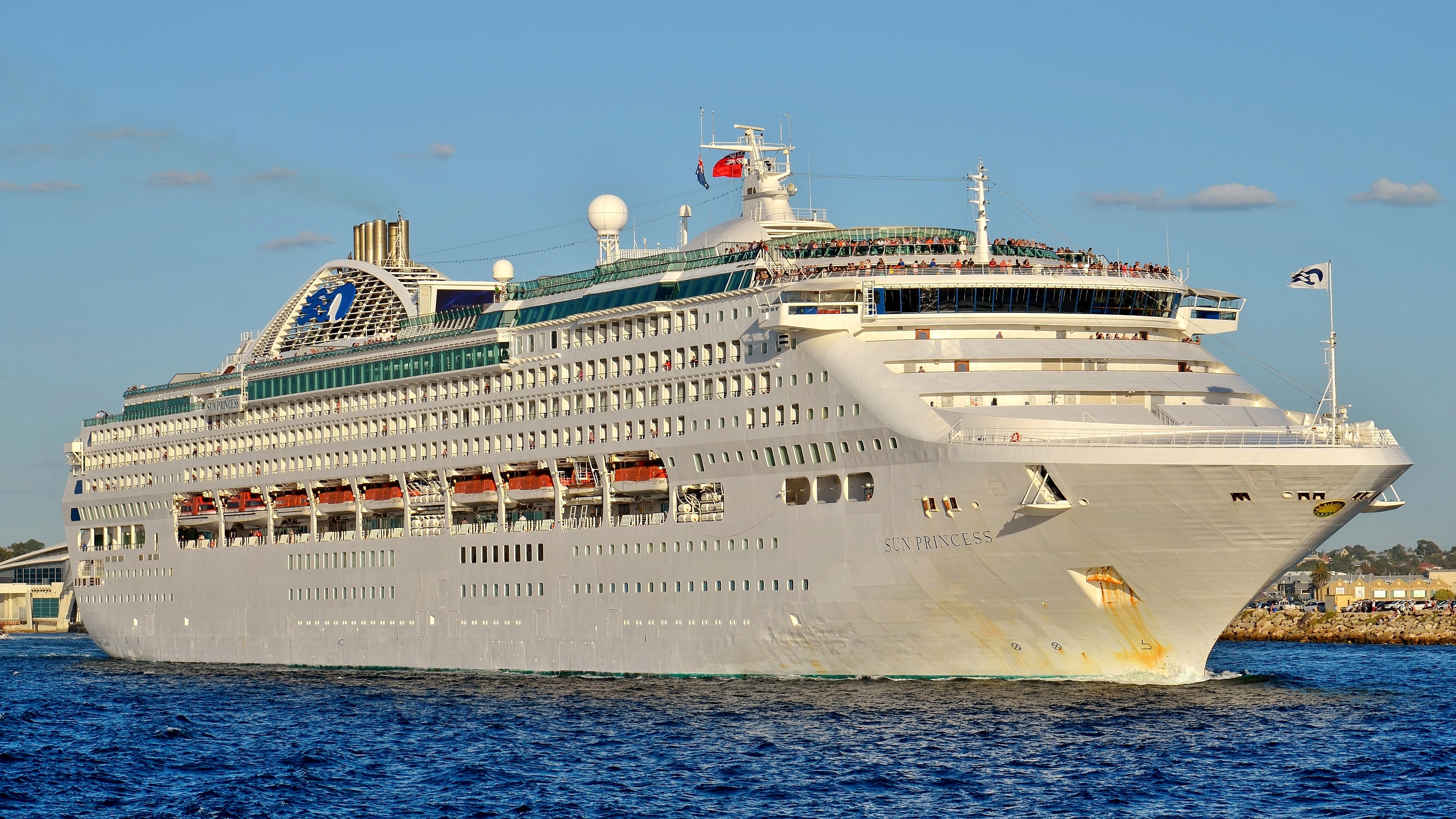
The 1995-built Sun Princess (pictured in 2016) marked the introduction of the brand's first purpose-built newbuild ship in a decade.

In the early 1990s, Princess was operating a fleet of mostly second-hand ships, with the majority having been inherited from the Sitmar Cruises acquisition. The last purpose-built Princess new build had been the Royal Princess in 1984, and the 3 recent inherited new builds had all been designed for Sitmar Cruises. A new building project was commenced with the first new build debuting in 1995 with Sun Princess as the lead vessel for the Sun-class. This was the first of four ships in the class, followed by Dawn Princess, Sea Princess, and Ocean Princess. At the same time Princess began transferring some of its older ships to parent company P&O Cruises and their subsidiaries P&O Australia. Dawn Princess left the fleet in 1993, Sea Princess in 1995, Golden Princess, 1996, Fair Princess in 1997, Island Princess in 1999.

==== Grand-class ====
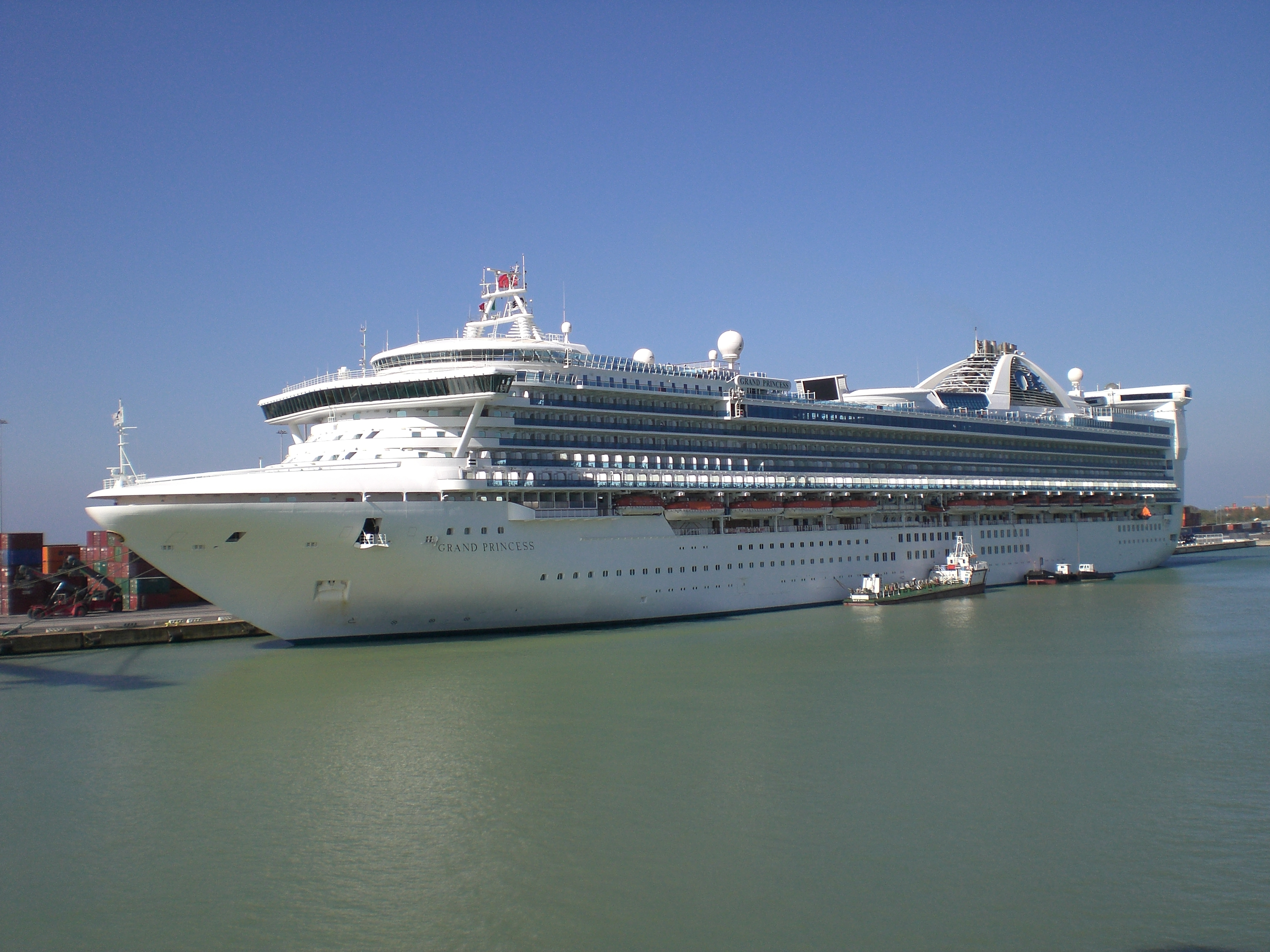
The 1998-built Grand Princess (pictured in 2009) was the world's largest cruise ship upon delivery.

Princess unveiled its first Grand-class vessel in 1998, the Grand Princess, which debuted on May 26, and was christened by Olivia de Havilland. At the time, the $450 million Fincantieri-built vessel was the largest passenger ship ever commissioned and completed. Two more ships in the class, Golden Princess and Star Princess, followed, pioneering the design that carried on through the following six vessels in the class, with the last ship delivered in 2008.

=== 2000–2002: P&O Princess spun off ===
On October 23, 2000, the Peninsular and Oriental Steam Navigation Company (P&O) spun-off its passenger division to form an independent company, P&O Princess Cruises. In 2001, Princess Cruises headquarters moved from Century City to Santa Clarita, near the Westfield Valencia Town Center.

With the debut of Golden Princess in North America in 2001, Sky Princess was deployed to Australia for P&O Cruises Australia in 2000 and replace Fair Princess. Sky Princess was transformed into Pacific Sky to become the sister brand's first modern-era cruise ship for the recently spun off P&O Cruises Australia. Star Princess commenced operations in March 2002 and became the first "mega-ship" to operate from the West Coast on a full-time basis. In June 2002, Crown Princess was transferred to P&O Princess's new start-up brand, A'Rosa Cruises, to be the only cruise ship in A'Rosa's fleet to help launch the brand.

In 2002 Pacific Princess, famous as the ship from The Love Boat, left the Princess fleet after 27 years of service with the line, and last of the original Princess fleet.

==== Coral-class introduction ====
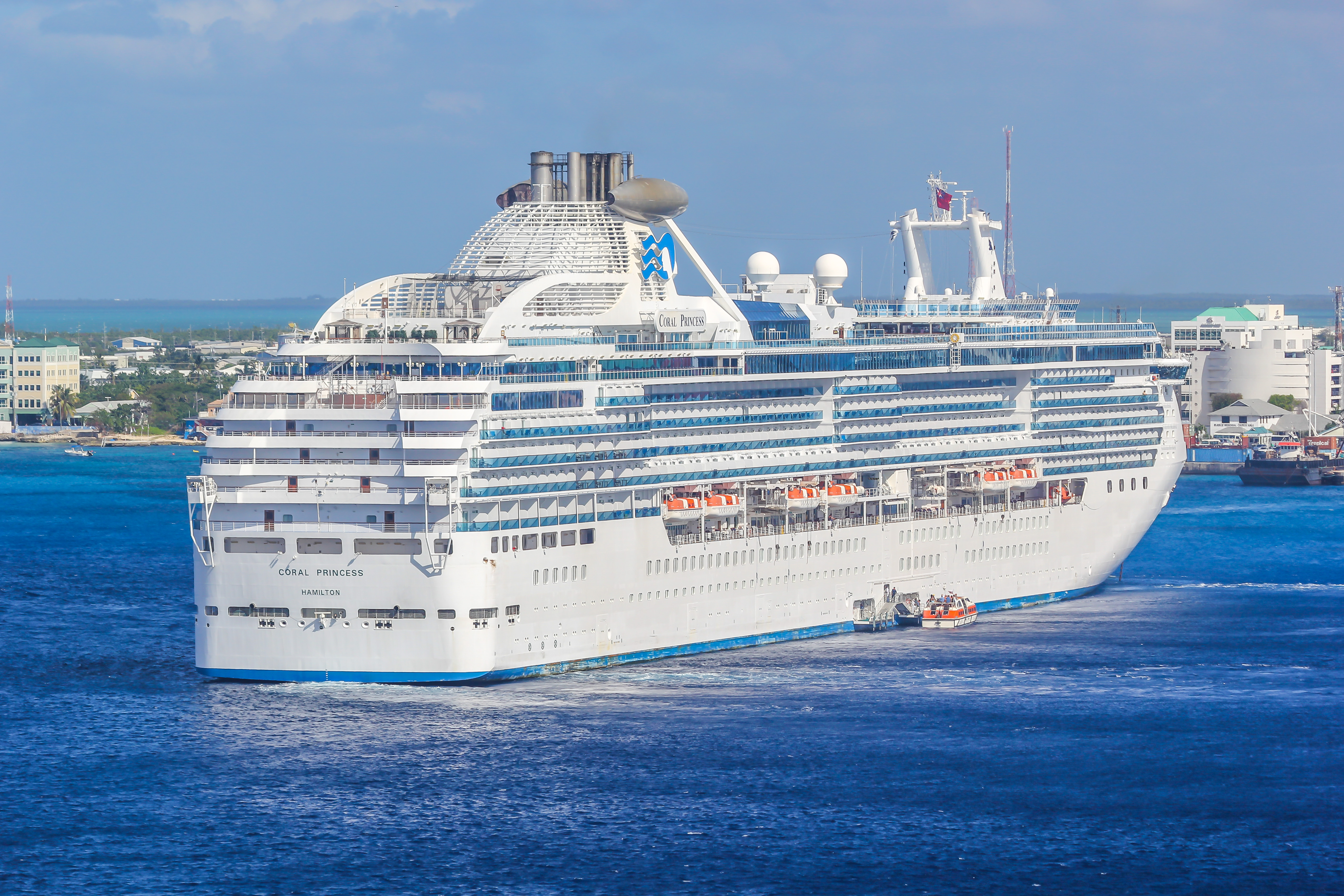
The 2002-built Coral Princess (pictured in 2012) was built to a maximized Panamax standard to transit the Panama Canal.

In 2002 and 2003 Princess debuted two panamax ships, the Coral Princess and Island Princess. Built to be the maximum sized ships to transit the Panama Canal, they were assigned for longer Southern Caribbean and Panama Canal cruises. They would also incorporate the ship engineering trend of the time of having additional gas turbine engines. This was emphasized in the ship's design with giant decorative faux turbines on each side of the funnel.

==== R-class ships acquisition ====
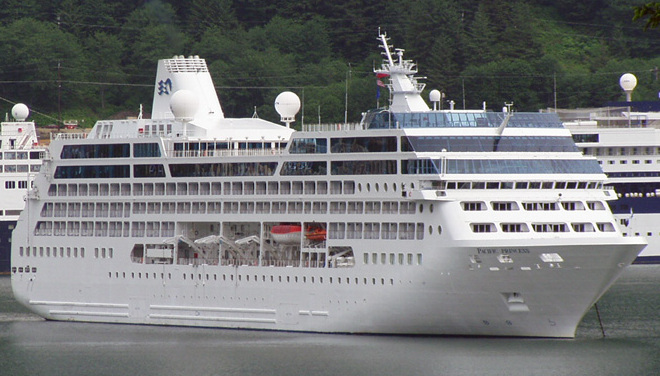
The 1999-built Pacific Princess (pictured in 2012) was acquired from Renaissance Cruises in 2002.

Princess eventually acquired two former Renaissance ships for the line starting in 2002. They were deployed for longer and more exotic destination cruises. The ships joining the fleet were Tahitian Princess, which was first based in Tahiti before being later renamed Ocean Princess, and Pacific Princess, reviving the famous name of the ship featured on The Love Boat.

=== 2003–2009: Carnival acquires P&O Princess ===
P&O Princess Cruises merged with Carnival Corporation on April 17, 2003, to form the world's largest cruise operating company in a deal worth US$5.4 billion. As a result of the merger, Carnival Corporation and P&O Princess were integrated to form Carnival Corporation & plc, with a portfolio of eleven cruise ship brands. It is a dual-listed company, registered in both the United States and the United Kingdom, with the former P&O Princess Cruises being relisted as Carnival plc, more commonly known as Carnival UK, which holds executive control over Cunard Line and P&O Cruises. As an American-based company, executive control of Princess Cruises was transferred to Carnival's American operations, with the formation of the Holland America Group umbrella, which comprises Princess, Holland America Line, Seabourn Cruise Line, and P&O Cruises Australia.

In 2005, Princess swapped two ships between it and sister brand P&O. The Royal Princess, Princess Cruises first purpose-built ship, was transferred to P&O Cruises in April after 21 years of service with the line. Princess reacquired Sea Princess in May from P&O, which it had transferred over just two years prior.

On April 3, 2008, Micky Arison, the chairman of Carnival Corporation & plc, stated that due to the low value of the United States dollar because of the recession, inflation and high shipbuilding costs, the company would not be ordering any new ships for their U.S.-based brands (Princess, Carnival Cruise Line, and Holland America Line) before the economic situation improved.

=== 2010–2021: Royal-class, COVID-19 pandemic ===
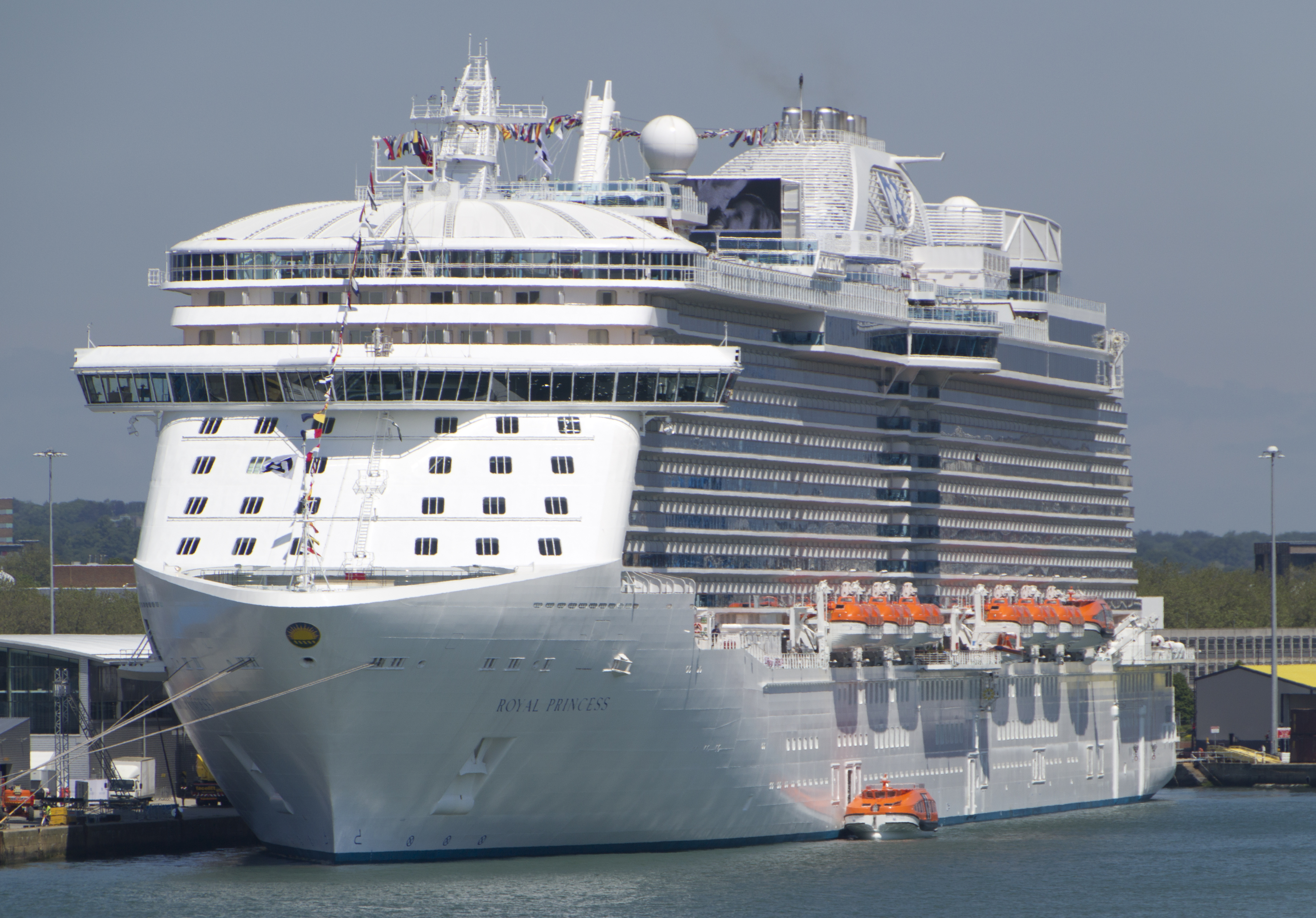
The 2013-built Royal Princess (pictured in 2013) became the largest ship to be built for Princess in its history.

In May 2010, Carnival Corporation & plc signed a contract with Fincantieri for the construction of two new 3,600-passenger ships, known as the Royal-class cruise ships, for Princess. At more than 140,000 GT, the Royal-class vessels became the largest ships ever constructed for Princess. Named in honor of Princess's former vessels bearing the Royal name, Royal Princess entered service in 2013 and became Princess's flagship vessel; she was quickly followed by Regal Princess in 2014. In 2017, Princess further invested in China via the delivery of their third Royal-class ship, Majestic Princess, which was designed for the Chinese-speaking market and scheduled to homeport in Shanghai. Following the delivery of Sky Princess in October 2019, Princess received two more Royal-class ships (Enchanted Princess and Discovery Princess) to complete the class in the fleet with six vessels.

==== COVID-19 outbreak ====
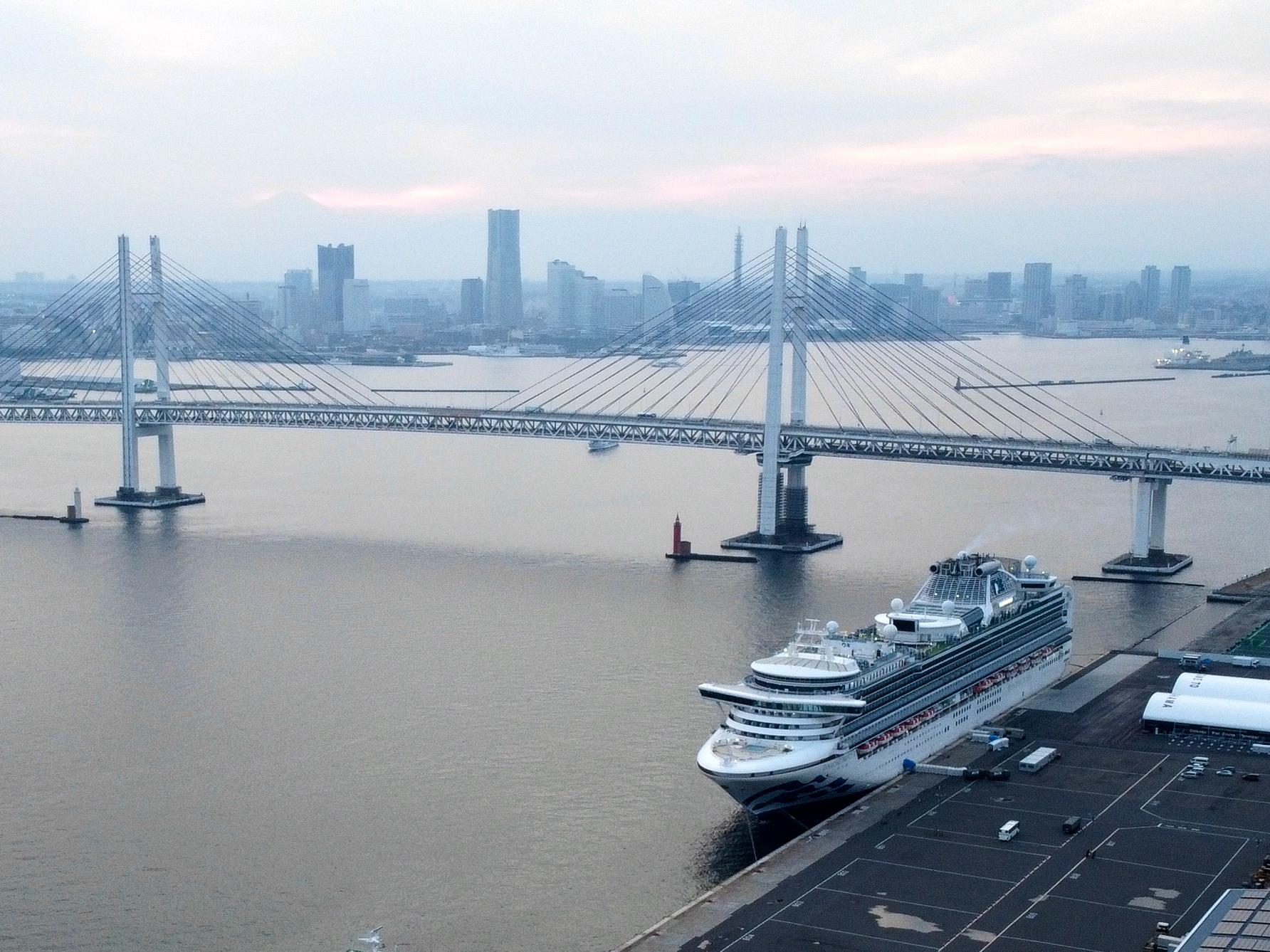
In the wake of the COVID-19 outbreak on Diamond Princess, the ship underwent a cleaning and disinfection process at Daikoku Pier at the Port of Yokohama in March 2020.

In 2020, Princess became the first major cruise line to be affected by the COVID-19 pandemic after an outbreak onboard Diamond Princess in February led 712 of the 3,711 people on board to become infected. The ship's outbreak and quarantine in Yokohama elicited global criticism, both for Japan's handling of its mandated quarantine procedures at the time and for Princess after it was reported Princess had initially assumed there was only minimal risk and had only initiated the lowest-level protocols for any outbreaks prior to the quarantine. Subsequent large-scale outbreaks onboard several more Princess vessels, including Ruby Princess in Australia and Grand Princess in California, accelerated Princess's suspension of operations as the broader industry proceeded into the pandemic-induced hiatus.

Amid the operational pause in 2020, Princess parted ways with four ships in advance of their initially projected timelines after increased speculation about a sale surrounded the brand's oldest ships. This came after Carnival Corporation revealed its goals to reduce overall fleet tonnage in a bid to reduce costs. In September, Princess sold its remaining two Sun-class ships, Sun Princess and Sea Princess. Sun Princess was later acquired by Peace Boat to become its largest ship and subsequently renamed Pacific World. Sea Princess was acquired by Chinese start-up Sanya International Cruise Development and renamed Charming. The following month, in October, Princess announced the official transfer of Golden Princess and accelerated transfer of Star Princess to sister brand P&O Cruises Australia, marking the first two Grand-class vessels to exit the fleet.

==== Post-pandemic recovery ====
Throughout the pause, Princess staffed all ships with skeleton crew who had been onboard for months longer than anticipated after the hiatus extended beyond original expectations. Princess resumed operations in July 2021 with a week-long voyage to Alaska from Seattle aboard Majestic Princess. In a bid to rebuild consumer confidence, all guests were required to have received a COVID-19 vaccine 14 days prior to departure. Rules were also enforced regarding the donning of face masks and social distancing, and capacity was reduced during the initial phase of the resumption. The success of the first voyages was followed by the resumption of service on seven additional vessels by the end of November 2021, with the whole fleet operating by the end of November 2022 after the reentry of Diamond Princess.

=== 2022–present: Homeport expansion, Sphere-class ===
After the success of the initial phased rollout of its resumption in the United States and amid the lingering uncertainty surrounding international travel restrictions related to the pandemic, in March 2022, Princess announced it would redeploy several ships from their originally scheduled distant homeports back to those in the United States. As a part of the redeployment, Princess revealed it would also return to the Port of San Diego with Diamond Princess in September 2022 (later postponed to November 2022 as a result of "staffing challenges") after more than ten years away, and to the Port of Galveston in December 2022 with Ruby Princess after a six-year absence. Princess has since made further expansions in its commitment to the American market with the stationing of the larger Regal Princess in Galveston, beginning in fall 2023, and the introduction of Port Canaveral to its network with Caribbean Princess to mark Princess's debut at the port in November 2024.

==== Sphere-class ====
In July 2018, Princess signed a memorandum of agreement with Fincantieri for the construction of two new 175,000 GT ships to be primarily powered by liquefied natural gas (LNG). The ships would become the largest vessels built in Italy and commissioned for Princess as well as the first in the fleet to run on LNG. The final contract was signed in March 2019, ushering in the development of the ships. Princess unveiled the names of the lead vessel and second ship as Sun Princess and Star Princess in September 2022 and May 2023, respectively, with both being the third ships in the fleet's history to bear their respective names.

Sun Princess made its debut in February 2024 after a short delay for additional technical work. Star Princess was also delayed and is now scheduled to sail beginning in September 2025.

=== 60th anniversary ===
A special commemorative 60th anniversary cruise on the Mexican Riviera is scheduled to depart from the Port of Los Angeles on March 6, 2026. The cruise, on the Royal Princess, will be hosted by Jill Whelan, who played Vicki Stubing in the TV series The Love Boat. The Temptations will provide a guest performance.

== Fleet ==
=== Current fleet ===
Ship	Built	Builder	in Princess service	Gross tonnage	Flag	Notes	Image
Grand class
All Grand-class ships are classified as NeoPanamax-type; as of 2016, access through the Panama Canal for these ships is facilitated by the newly opened Agua Clara locks.
Grand Princess	1998	Fincantieri	1998–present	107,517 GT	Bermuda	Largest and most expensive cruise ship ever to be constructed upon debut in 1998; Lead ship of the class	
Diamond Princess	2004	Mitsubishi Heavy Industries	2004–present	115,875 GT	United Kingdom	One of two modified Grand-class ships built in Japan, originally ordered as Sapphire Princess, traded names after Diamond Princess shipyard fire; classified as Gem class.; Outfitted to exclusively sail around Japan and Southeast Asia; Features additional gas turbine engine	
Sapphire Princess	2004	Mitsubishi Heavy Industries	2004–present	115,875 GT	United Kingdom	Originally ordered as Diamond Princess, she caught fire while under construction, delaying delivery and causing the ship to swap names and be renamed Sapphire Princess.; One of two modified Grand-class ships built in Japan, classified as Gem class; Features additional gas turbine engine	
Caribbean Princess	2004	Fincantieri	2004–present	112,894 GT	Bermuda	Modified Grand-class cruise ship, classified as Caribbean class	
Crown Princess	2006	Fincantieri	2006–present	113,561 GT	Bermuda	Second ship to bear the name Crown Princess; Modified Grand-class cruise ship, classified as a Crown class	
Emerald Princess	2007	Fincantieri	2007–present	113,561 GT	Bermuda		
Ruby Princess	2008	Fincantieri	2008–present	113,561 GT	Bermuda	Final ship of the class upon delivery in 2008	
Coral class
Coral Princess	2002	Chantiers de l'Atlantique	2003–present	91,627 GT	Bermuda	Panamax type; Lead ship of the class	
Island Princess	2003	Chantiers de l'Atlantique	2003–present	91,627 GT	Bermuda	Panamax-type; Second ship to bear the name Island Princess; Increased passenger berths in 2015.	
Royal class
Royal Princess	2013	Fincantieri	2013–present	142,229 GT	Bermuda	Third ship to bear the name Royal Princess	
Regal Princess	2014	Fincantieri	2014–present	142,229 GT	Bermuda	Second ship to bear the name Regal Princess	
Majestic Princess	2017	Fincantieri	2017–present	142,216 GT	Bermuda	Originally outfitted to accommodate the Chinese-speaking market	
Sky Princess	2019	Fincantieri	2019–present	145,281 GT	Bermuda	Second ship to bear the name Sky Princess; First of three Princess's largest ships in the cruise line's history; First of three sister ships to feature more passenger cabins, larger crew complement, and higher guest capacity than older sister ships	
Enchanted Princess	2020	Fincantieri	2020–present	145,281 GT	Bermuda	Delivered in September 2020 but commenced operations in November 2021 due to the cruise line's COVID-19 operations suspension	
Discovery Princess	2022	Fincantieri	2022–present	145,000 GT	Bermuda	Final Royal-class ship to be delivered; Delivered in January 2022 and commenced operations in March 2022	
Sphere class
Sun Princess	2024	Fincantieri	2024–present	175,500 GT	Bermuda	First LNG-powered Princess ship; Largest ship commissioned for Princess; Third ship to bear the name Sun Princess; Delivered on 14 February 2024; Maiden voyage 8 February 2024, but postponed	
Star Princess	2025	Fincantieri	2025-Present	175,500 GT	Bermuda	2nd LNG-powered Princess ship; Sister ship to Sun Princess; Third ship to bear the name Star Princess; Maiden voyage was scheduled for 4 August 2025 postponed to 4 October 2025	

=== Future fleet ===
In April 2026, the new Voyager-class was announced. The 183,000 GT-ships will be built at Fincantieri shipyard in Monfalcone, Italy. Delivery is planned for 2035, 2038 and 2039.

=== Former fleet ===
Ship	In service for Princess	tonnage	Service Notes	Fate	Image
Various classes
Princess Patricia	1965–1966		First Princess ship in the fleet; Built in 1949 and scrapped in Taiwan in 1995	Scrapped 1995	
Princess Italia	1967–1973		Sailed as Sapphire between 2002 and 2010 with Louis Cruise Lines; Sold for scrap in 2012	Scrapped 2012	
Princess Carla	1968–1970		Built in 1952 as Flandre for the French Line; Owned by Costa but chartered to Princess; Never renamed but Princess marketed ship as Princess Carla; Sold by Costa to Epirotiki Lines and renamed Pallas Athena; Sold for scrap after being destroyed by a fire in 1994	Destroyed by fire and subsequently scrapped in 1994	
Sun Princess	1974–1989		Ordered for Norwegian Cruise Line as Seaward, completed in 1972 by P&O Cruises as Spirit of London; Sailed for Runfeng Ocean (Hong Kong) Deluxe Cruises Limited as Ocean Dream beginning in 2012; Capsized and sunk in February 2016	Sunk in 2016 later scrapped on site	
Sea Princess	1979–1995		Built as the Swedish American Line ship Kungsholm in 1966; Transferred to P&O Cruises as Victoria; Sailed for Lord Nelson Seereisen as Mona Lisa since 2008; Operated as Veronica, a hotel ship in Oman from 2012 to 2013; Beached for scrap in Alang in 2016	Scrapped 2016	
Royal Princess	1984–2005		First purpose-built ship for Princess Cruises; Christened by Princess Diana; First cruise ship with all-outside staterooms; Sailed for P&O Cruises as Artemis from 2005 to 2011; Transferred to Phoenix Reisen in 2011 and sails as Artania	Sailing as Artania for Phoenix Reisen	
Sky Princess	1988–2000		Built for Sitmar Cruises as Fairsky; Sailed for Pullmantur Cruises in 2011 as Atlantic Star; Scrapped at Aliaga, Turkey in 2013.	Scrapped 2013	
Star Princess	1989–1997		Originally ordered for Sitmar Cruises as Fair Majesty, completed by Princess Cruises; Transferred to P&O Cruises in 1997 as Arcadia.; Transferred in 2003 to Ocean Village, operating as Ocean Village; Transferred in 2010 to P&O Cruises Australia as Pacific Pearl; Sold to Cruise & Maritime Voyages, sailed as Columbus; Sold in 2020 at auction to Seajets; Resold for scrap in 2021	Scrapped 2021	
Golden Princess	1993–1996		Built in 1973 as Royal Viking Sky; Chartered to Princess from 1993 to 1996; Sold to Star Cruises and renamed SuperStar Capricorn; Sailed for Fred. Olsen Cruise Lines as Boudicca from 2005 until 2020; Sold for scrap in 2021	Scrapped 2021	
Pacific class
Pacific Princess	1974–2002		Built in 1971 as Sea Venture for Flagship Cruises; Featured prominently on the TV show, The Love Boat; Sailed for Quail Cruises as Pacific since 2008; Scrapped in 2013	Scrapped 2013	
Island Princess	1974–1999		Built in 1972 as Island Venture for Flagship Cruises; Also featured on the TV show, The Love Boat; Sailed for Voyages of Discovery between 2002 and 2013 as Discovery; Operated with Cruise & Maritime Voyages under the same name; Sold for scrap in 2014	Scrapped 2014	
Saxonia class
Fair Princess	1988–1997		Built for Cunard Line as RMS Carinthia in 1956; Rebuilt for Sitmar Cruises in 1968; Scrapped at Alang, India, in 2005.	Scrapped 2005	
Dawn Princess	1988–1993		Built for Cunard Line as RMS Sylvania in 1957; Rebuilt for Sitmar Cruises in 1968; Scrapped at Alang, India, in 2004.	Scrapped 2004	
Crown class
Crown Princess	1990–2002		Originally for Sitmar Cruises, designed by Renzo Piano, completed by Princess Cruises; Sailed for A'Rosa Cruises as A'Rosa Blu from 2002 to 2004; Sailed for AIDA Cruises as AIDAblu from 2004 to 2007; Sailed for Ocean Village as Ocean Village Two from 2007 to 2009; Sailed for P&O Cruises Australia as Pacific Jewel from 2009 to 2019; Sailed for Jalesh Cruises as Karnika from 2019 to 2020; Sold for scrap in 2020	Scrapped 2020	
Regal Princess	1991–2007		Originally for Sitmar Cruises, designed by Renzo Piano, completed by Princess Cruises; Sailed for P&O Cruises Australia as Pacific Dawn from 2007 to 2020.; Was sold to Cruise & Maritime Voyages in 2019 and intended to transfer in 2021. The transfer was cancelled when CMV went into administration.; Sold in 2020 to Ocean Builders as Satoshi as a floating hotel in Panama. The project was eventually abandoned due to funding issues.; Sailed as Ambience after being sold to a new start up Ambassador Cruise Line in 2021	Sailing as Ambience for Ambassador Cruise Line	
Sun class
Sun Princess	1995–2020		Second ship to be named Sun Princess; First purpose-built new build for Princess Cruises since Royal Princess in 1984. Sold off as a result of the 2020 COVID-19 pandemic and renamed Pacific World	Sailing as Pacific World	
Dawn Princess	1997–2017		Second ship to be named Dawn Princess; Transferred to P&O Cruises Australia in 2017 and renamed Pacific Explorer.; Former Renamed as Pacific Explorer in 2021; Transferred and expected to join Star Cruises in 2025	Renamed and sailing as Star Voyager in 2025	
Sea Princess	1998–2020		Second ship to be named Sea Princess; Previously Adonia with P&O Cruises from 2003 to 2005. Sold off as a result of the 2020 COVID-19 pandemic.	Sailing as Dream	
Ocean Princess	2000–2002		Sailed for P&O Cruises as Oceana from 2002 to 2020; Sold to Seajets in 2020 as Queen of the Oceans	Laid up as Queen of the Oceans	
Grand class
Golden Princess	2001–2020	108,865 tons	Second ship to be named Golden Princess; Transferred to P&O Cruises Australia in October 2020; Renamed as Pacific Adventure in 2021; Transferred to Carnival Cruise Line in March 2025 and renamed Carnival Adventure	Sailing as Carnival Adventure in 2025	
Star Princess	2002–2020	108,977 tons	Second ship to be named Star Princess; Transferred to P&O Cruises Australia in October 2020; Was to be transferred in November 2021, brought forward due to COVID-19 Pandemic; Renamed as Pacific Encounter in 2021; Transferred to Carnival Cruise Line in March 2025 and renamed Carnival Encounter	Sailing as Carnival Encounter in 2025	
R class
Pacific Princess	2002–2021		Built in 1999 as R Three for Renaissance Cruises; Leased to Princess and renamed, the second ship to be named Pacific Princess; Sold to Azamara Cruises in January 2021 to become Azamara Onward	Sailing as Azamara Onward	
Ocean Princess	2002–2016		Built in 1999 as R Four for Renaissance Cruises; Leased to Princess and renamed Tahitian Princess.; Renamed, and second ship to be named Ocean Princess in 2009.; Sold to Oceania Cruises in March 2016 to become Sirena.	Sailing as Sirena	
Royal Princess	2007–2011		Built in 2001 as R Eight for Renaissance Cruises; Leased to Princess and renamed, second ship to be named Royal Princess; Transferred to P&O Cruises in 2011 and sailed as Adonia; Transferred to Fathom in 2016 as Adonia; Transferred back to P&O Cruises in 2017; Renamed and sailing as Azamara Pursuit since 2019	Sailing as Azamara Pursuit	

== Accidents and incidents ==
Princess Cruises was involved in litigation with General Electric in 1998 over consequential damages and lost profits resulting from a contract the two parties entered into. General Electric was to provide inspection and repair services for Sky Princess. Upon noticing surface rust on the turbine rotor, the turbine was brought ashore for cleaning and balancing, but good metal was unintentionally removed. This destabilized the rotor, forcing Princess Cruises to cancel two 10-day cruises while additional work was performed. Princess originally prevailed, being awarded nearly $4.6 million. On appeal, however, the judgement was reversed in favor of General Electric, and Princess Cruises only recovered the price of the contract, less than $232,000.

=== Ocean pollution ===
On August 26, 2013, the crew of Caribbean Princess deliberately discharged 4,227 US gallons (16,000 L) of oil-contaminated waste off the southern coast of England. The discharge involved the illegal modification of the vessel's on-board pollution control systems, and was photographed by a newly hired engineer. When the ship subsequently berthed at Southampton, the engineer resigned his position and reported the discharge to the UK Maritime and Coastguard Agency. An investigation launched by the U.S. Department of Justice Environment and Natural Resources Division (ENRD) found that the practice had been taking place on Caribbean Princess and four other Princess ships – Star Princess, Grand Princess, Coral Princess, and Golden Princess – since 2005.

In December 2016, Princess agreed to plead guilty to seven felony charges and pay a $40 million penalty. The charges related to illegal discharges off the coasts of Florida, Maine, Massachusetts, New Jersey, New York, Rhode Island, South Carolina, Texas, Virginia, the U.S. Virgin Islands and Puerto Rico. As part of the agreement, cruise ships from eight Carnival companies, including Carnival Cruise Line and Holland America Line, were required to operate for five years under a court-supervised environmental compliance plan with independent audits and a court-appointed monitor. The fine was the "largest-ever criminal penalty involving deliberate vessel pollution."

For violation of the probation terms of 2016, Carnival Corporation and Princess were ordered to pay an additional $20 million penalty in 2019. The new violations included discharging plastic into waters in the Bahamas, falsifying records, and interfering with court supervision.

=== COVID-19 pandemic ===
During the COVID-19 pandemic, several ships from the cruise line became major clusters of infection of the disease, including Diamond Princess and Ruby Princess, spreading it around the world. By February, 712 cases had developed on Diamond Princess, of which 11 eventually died. This drew worldwide attention and led to several countries repatriating their citizens from the ship. Shortly before the disease was declared a pandemic, and with over 2700 passengers on board, Ruby Princess sailed into international waters despite a global increase of confirmed cases of COVID-19. By mid April, there were 852 confirmed cases among Australian passengers alone, and 21 deaths. The subsequent discharge of infected passengers into Australia worsened the national pandemic in the country and caused a humanitarian crisis. Other related incidents:

- Sun Princess was not allowed to dock at a port in Madagascar on 13 February 2020 as it had visited Thailand, where there were cases of SARS-CoV-2, less than 14 days before. The ship docked at Réunion on 1 March, but passengers were met by a crowd of about 30 people who insisted that the passengers must be inspected for SARS-CoV-2, and tried to prevent them from leaving the port area. Missiles were thrown at passengers, and the police deployed tear gas.
- A crew member on Grand Princess had transferred to Royal Princess fifteen days before, the CDC issued a "no-sail order" on 8 March 2020, due to COVID-19 infections, prompting Princess Cruises to cancel the ship's seven-day cruise to Mexico before it departed Los Angeles.
- On 7 March, Regal Princess tested two crewmembers for SARS-CoV-2, and delayed docking at Port Everglades for almost a day while waiting for test results to come back.
  - A passenger on board contracted COVID-19 on the cruise and died, resulting in the ship being quarantined off the coast of San Francisco because of further infections.
- On 20 March 2020, Princess announced that three passengers and a crew member of Ruby Princess had tested positive for COVID-19. The ship had docked in Sydney Harbour, and the passengers had disembarked before the results came back positive. The ship had returned to Sydney with 1,100 crew members and 2,700 passengers, and 13 people that were sick were tested for the virus. On April 5, 2020, the New South Wales Police Force announced they had launched a criminal investigation into whether the operator of the Ruby Princess downplayed potential coronavirus cases before thousands of passengers disembarked in Sydney.
- On 6 January 2021, Princess Cruises announced that it will cancel cruises through 14 May 2021.

The vast majority of all cruise lines's sailings were under suspension in late 2020. As of 6 January 2021, all Princess sailings were cancelled to at least 14 May 2021.

== See also ==
- Private island
