= Princess Cays =

Tourist resort in the Bahamas

Coordinates: 24.6370°N 76.1751°W

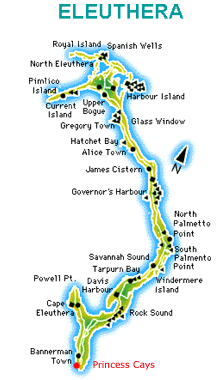

Area
  - Total: 0.16 km^{2} (0.062 sq mi)
- Time zone: EST
  - Summer (DST): EDT

Princess Cays is a tourist resort at the southern end of the island of Eleuthera, The Bahamas. It is owned by Carnival Corporation, which owns Princess Cruises, among others. Carnival Corporation also owns nearby Half Moon Cay. Contrary to the implication of its name, it is located on Eleuthera, rather than on separate islands.

Late January 28, 2019, a fire ignited at a generator, causing damage to the resort.

== Geography ==
Princess Cays is located approximately 50 miles (80 km) from Nassau, The Bahamas.

Visitors can go swimming, canoeing, kayaking, banana boating, water skiing, snorkeling, parasailing, sailboating, or waverunning. There are also volleyball and basketball courts. Cabanas are available for daily rental. English is spoken and US currency is used.

== Climate ==
The island has a tropical climate, with little seasonal variation. Average daily high temperatures in winter are about 75 °F (24 °C), while daily highs in summer are in the 85–88 °F (29–31 °C). The dry season is in winter, while summer is often the wet season with daily thunderstorms.

== See also ==
- Private island
