= Regal Princess (ship) =

Regal Princess may refer to one of the following ships:

- Regal Princess (1990), in service with Princess Cruise Line between 1991 and 2007
- Regal Princess (2013), commenced service with Princess Cruise Line in 2014
