= Britannia (2014 ship) =

Cruise ship operated by P&O Cruises

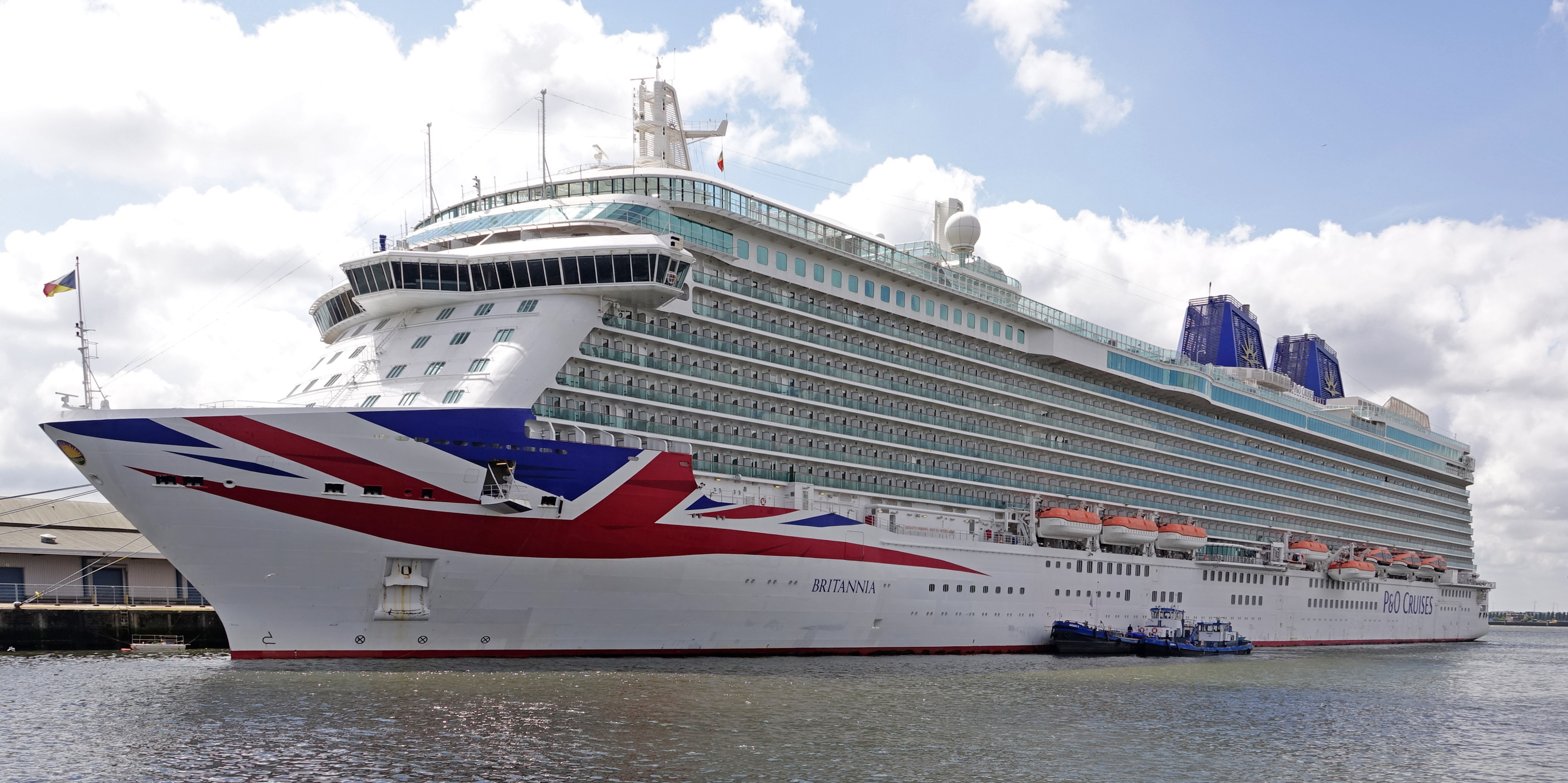
- Britannia in Rotterdam in 2019

History

Bermuda
- Name: Britannia
- Owner: Carnival Corporation & plc
- Operator: P&O Cruises
- Port of registry: Hamilton, Bermuda
- Ordered: 2011
- Builder: Fincantieri, Monfalcone, Italy
- Cost: £473 million
- Yard number: 6231
- Laid down: 15 May 2013
- Launched: 14 February 2014
- Christened: 10 March 2015 by Queen Elizabeth II
- Completed: 26 February 2015
- Maiden voyage: 14 March 2015
- In service: 14 March 2015
- Identification: Call sign: ZCHH2; IMO number: 9614036; MMSI number: 310858000
- Status: In service

General characteristics
- Class & type: Royal-class cruise ship
- Tonnage: 143,730 GT; 119,023 NT
- Length: 330 m (1,082 ft 8 in)
- Beam: 38.4 m (126 ft 0 in)
- Height: 70.67 m (231 ft 10 in)
- Draft: 8.3 m (27 ft 3 in) (max)
- Decks: 15 passenger decks
- Installed power: Total 62 MW (83,000 hp)
- Propulsion: Wärtsilä 12V46F x 2 & Wärtsilä 14V46F x 2 & propulsion electric motors - 2 x VEM Sachsenwerk GMBH
- Speed: 21.9 knots (40.6 km/h; 25.2 mph) at 136 rev/min
- Capacity: 3,647 passengers
- Crew: 1,398

MV Britannia is a cruise ship of the P&O Cruises fleet. She was built by Fincantieri at its shipyard in Monfalcone, Italy.

Britannia is the flagship of the fleet, taking the honour from Oriana. She officially entered service on 14 March 2015, and was named by Queen Elizabeth II. Her first captain was Paul Brown.

Britannia features a 94-metre (308 ft) Union Flag on her bow, the largest of its kind in the world.

== Naming and construction ==
Britannia was ordered in 2011 and was laid down on 15 May 2013. The ship was built at the Fincantieri yard at Monfalcone in Italy.

The name Britannia was announced on 24 September 2013 and has historical importance for P&O, as there have been two previous ships named Britannia connected with the company. The first entered service in 1835 for the General Steam Navigation Company, which went on to become the Peninsular Steam Navigation Company. The second, which entered service in 1887, was one of four ships ordered by the company to mark the golden jubilee of both Queen Victoria and P&O itself. The ceremonial float out of the third Britannia took place on the afternoon of 14 February 2014, with the traditional champagne bottle smashed against the vessel's hull. Britannia departed the Fincantieri ship yard on 27 February 2015 for Southampton via Gibraltar. Britannia was officially named on 10 March 2015 by Queen Elizabeth II at the Ocean Terminal.

== Facilities ==
On board, Britannia features 13 bars as well as 13 restaurants and cafés.

TV chef James Martin developed "The Cookery Club" on board Britannia. The venue features celebrity chefs/cooks such as Mary Berry, James Tanner, Antonio Carluccio, Paul Rankin and Pierre Koffman. Eric Lanlard has his own patisserie, Market Café, in the ship's atrium. He also created an upgraded afternoon tea service in the Epicurean restaurant. Atul Kochhar, of the Michelin-starred Benares restaurant in London, supervises menus in Sindhu (as also seen on fleetmates Ventura and Azura). Marco Pierre White creates menu items served in the main restaurants on gala nights. The ship has a 936-seat theatre.

Britannia has a total of 1,837 cabins with 27 of those being single cabins (inside and balcony), in addition to conventional inside and balcony cabins; 64 of the cabins are designated as suites. For the first time on a P&O Cruises ship, all outside cabins have balconies. Britannia has four pools including a dedicated pool for teenagers, and the Oasis Spa.

In October 2019, Britannia entered dry dock to undergo a major refit and refurbishment. The changes included the addition of a new art gallery, new shopping outlets and a redesigned Atrium.

== Maiden voyage and itineraries ==
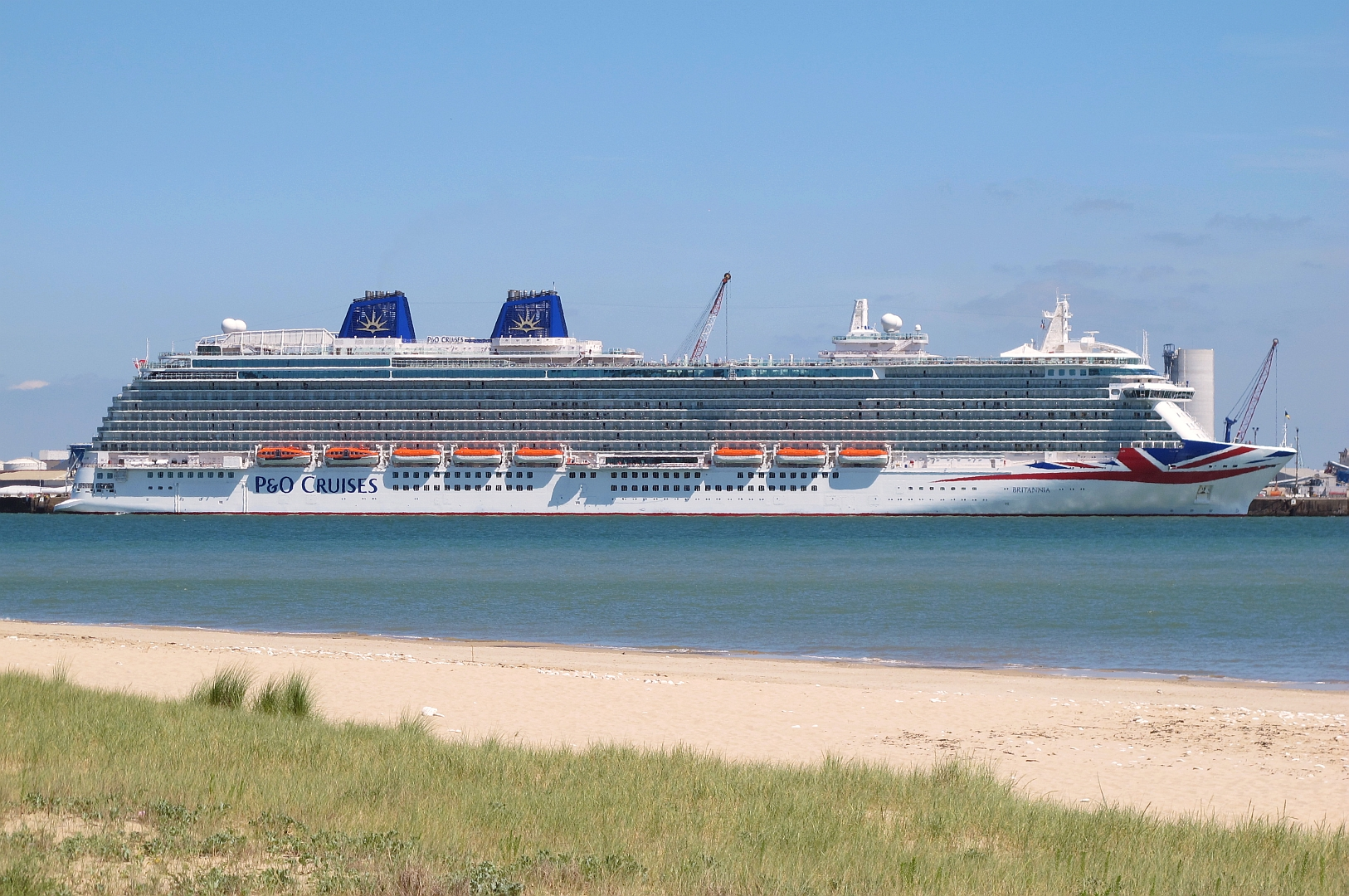
MV Britannia in La Rochelle 28 May 2015

Britannia's maiden voyage took place 14–28 March 2015, and included visits to Spain, Italy and France.

During her summer season, Britannia sails to the Mediterranean, Norwegian fjords, the Baltic, Canary Islands and Atlantic Islands. In winter, the ship operates 14-night Caribbean itineraries.

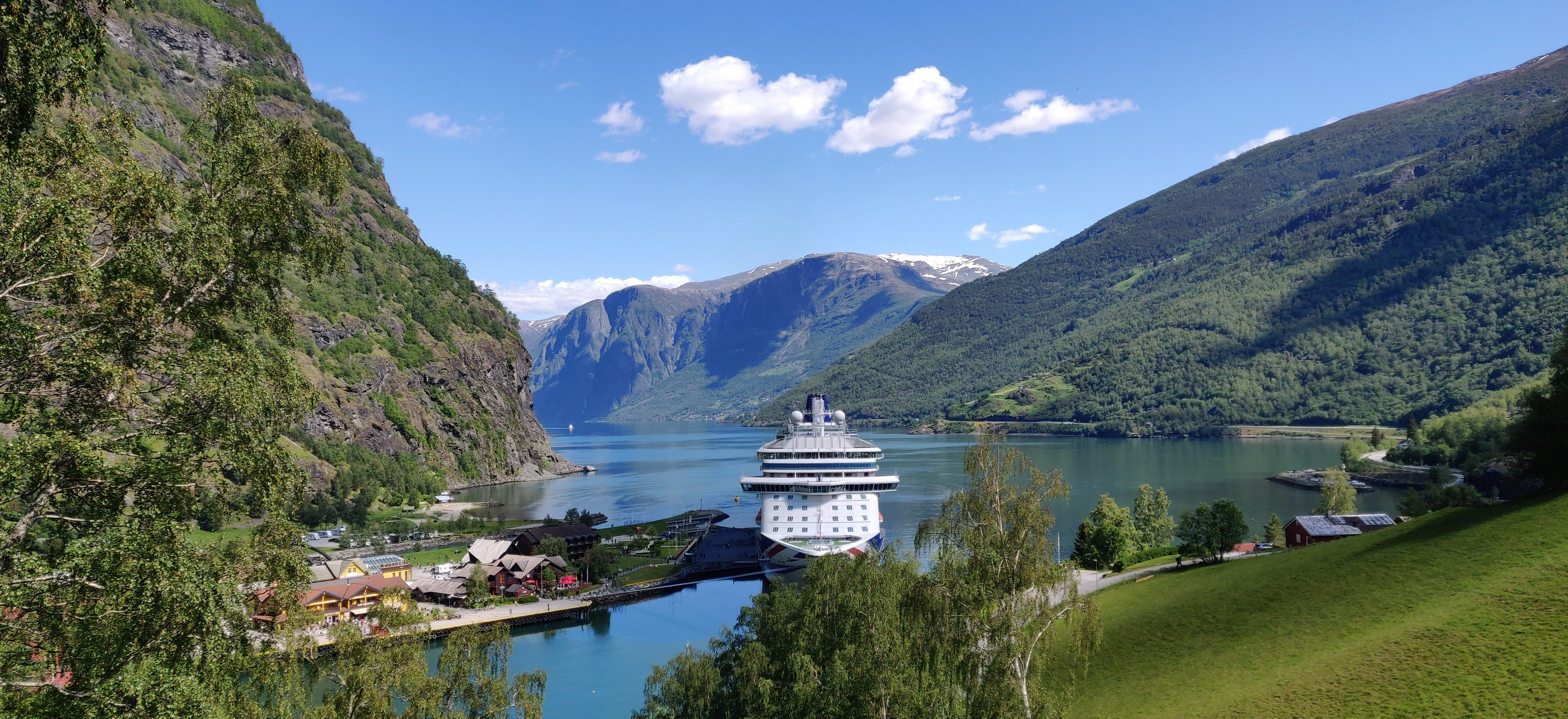
Britannia docked at Flåm, Norway in June 2019

Ant & Dec's Saturday Night Takeaway was recorded and shown live on board as the final show of the 13th series, on 2 April 2016.

== Similar ships ==
In 2013, Princess Cruises began operating the lead vessel in its Royal class, Royal Princess. Britannia is built to the same template, but its character and exterior appearance is tailored for P&O. The second ship of the Royal class, Regal Princess, was delivered 11 May 2014 to Princess Cruises.

== Incidents ==
In 2019, there was a brawl on board. Six people, including a member of staff, were injured in the late-night fight in one of the restaurants.

On 27 August 2023, Britannia broke her moorings while docked in Palma de Mallorca, Spain, during a sudden storm. She drifted across the harbour and collided with a moored oil tanker, the Castillo de Arteaga. It was reported that a small number of people on Britannia had sustained minor injuries, and were being cared for by the onboard medical centre.
