= Majestic Princess =

Royal-class cruise ship operated by Princess Cruises

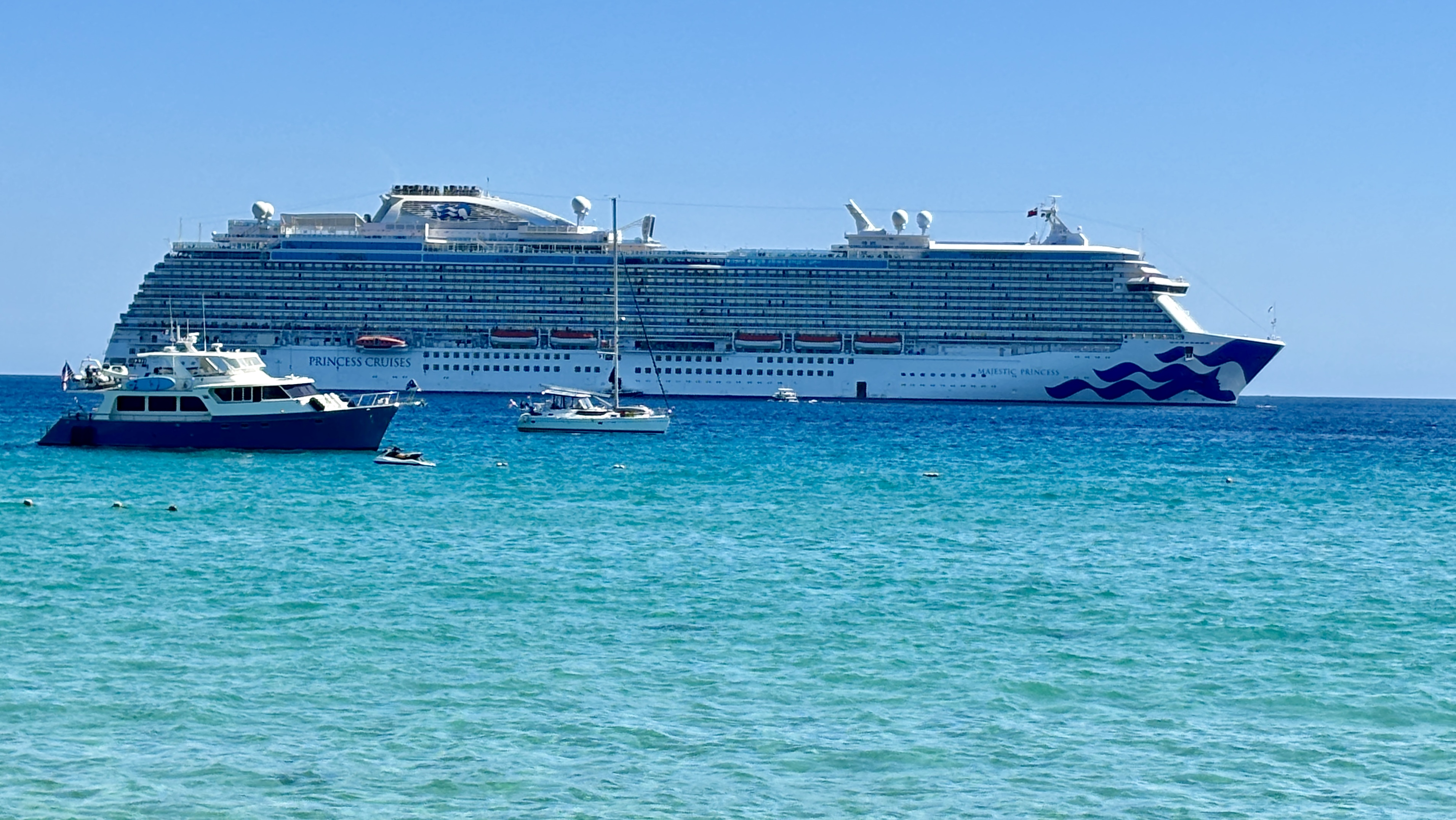
- Majestic Princess in Cabo San Lucas, Mexico, 2024

History

Bermuda
- Name: Majestic Princess
- Owner: Carnival Corporation & plc
- Operator: Princess Cruises
- Port of registry: United Kingdom
- Ordered: 30 July 2014
- Builder: Fincantieri (Monfalcone, Italy)
- Yard number: 6232
- Laid down: 10 July 2015
- Launched: 8 February 2016
- Sponsored by: Yao Ming and Ye Li
- Christened: 9 July 2017
- Completed: 2017
- Acquired: 30 March 2017
- Maiden voyage: 4 April 2017
- In service: 2017—present
- Identification: IMO number: 9614141; MMSI number: 232002990; Callsign: MABI4
- Status: In service

General characteristics
- Class & type: Royal-class cruise ship
- Tonnage: 144,216 GT; 121,836 NT; 11,277 DWT
- Length: 330.0 m (1,082 ft 8 in)
- Beam: 38.4 m (126 ft 0 in)
- Height: 68.3 m (224 ft 1 in)
- Draught: 8.55 m (28 ft 1 in)
- Decks: 19
- Installed power: 2 × Wärtsilä 12V46F Diesel generators producing 14,400 kW (19,300 hp) each; 2 × Wärtsilä 14V46F Diesel generators producing 16,800 kW (22,500 hp) each; Total Installed Power: 62,400 kW (83,700 hp)
- Propulsion: 2 × 18,000 kW (24,000 hp)
- Speed: Service speed: 22 kn (41 km/h); Maximum speed: 23 kn (43 km/h)
- Capacity: 3,560
- Crew: 1,346

Majestic Princess is a British-registered Royal-class cruise ship operated by Princess Cruises, a subsidiary of Carnival Corporation & plc. Built by Italian shipbuilder Fincantieri in Monfalcone and delivered in March 2017, she became the third Royal-class ship to debut in the fleet.

== Design ==
Majestic Princess was originally outfitted to accommodate the Chinese market, with facilities and amenities originally designed to meet Chinese tastes and needs. This included accommodating all passengers with Chinese in signage, announcements, and offerings. Such facilities include a Cantonese cuisine-centered specialty restaurant, a tea bar, a VIP casino, and private karaoke rooms.

Majestic Princess has 18 decks, 15 of which are accessible to passengers. She currently measures 144,216 GT, has a length of 330.0 m (1,082 ft 8 in), a draft of 8.4 m (27 ft 7 in), and a beam of 38.4 m (126 ft 0 in). She is powered by a diesel-electric genset system, with four total Wärtsilä engines, producing a total output of 62.4 MW (83,700 hp). Main propulsion is via two propellers, each driven by an 18-megawatt (24,000 hp) electric motor. The system gives the vessel a service speed of 22 kn (41 km/h) and a maximum speed of 23 kn (43 km/h). The ship houses 1,780 passenger cabins and 757 crew cabins. Of the 1,780 passenger cabins, 81% have a balcony. The ship has a maximum capacity of 5,600 passengers and crew.

== Construction ==
The then-unnamed vessel was ordered on 30 July 2014 from Fincantieri at a cost of €600 million. The ship was planned to carry the same features and design as her two sister ships, Royal Princess and Regal Princess. In May 2015, Princess announced that their third Royal-class ship would be deployed to China year-round and be modified accordingly. On 9 October 2015, it was unveiled that the ship would be named Majestic Princess, and also carry the conjoining Chinese name, 盛世公主号 (Shèngshì Gōngzhǔ Hào, literally Golden age princess), an interpretation selected by Carnival PLC China's employees, which means "Grand World" or "Grand Spirit". On 10 July 2015, the ship's keel was laid at the Fincantieri shipyard in Monfalcone. She was floated out on 8 February 2016. In January 2017, she successfully completed her sea trials. Majestic Princess was delivered to Princess Cruises on 30 March 2017 in Monfalcone.

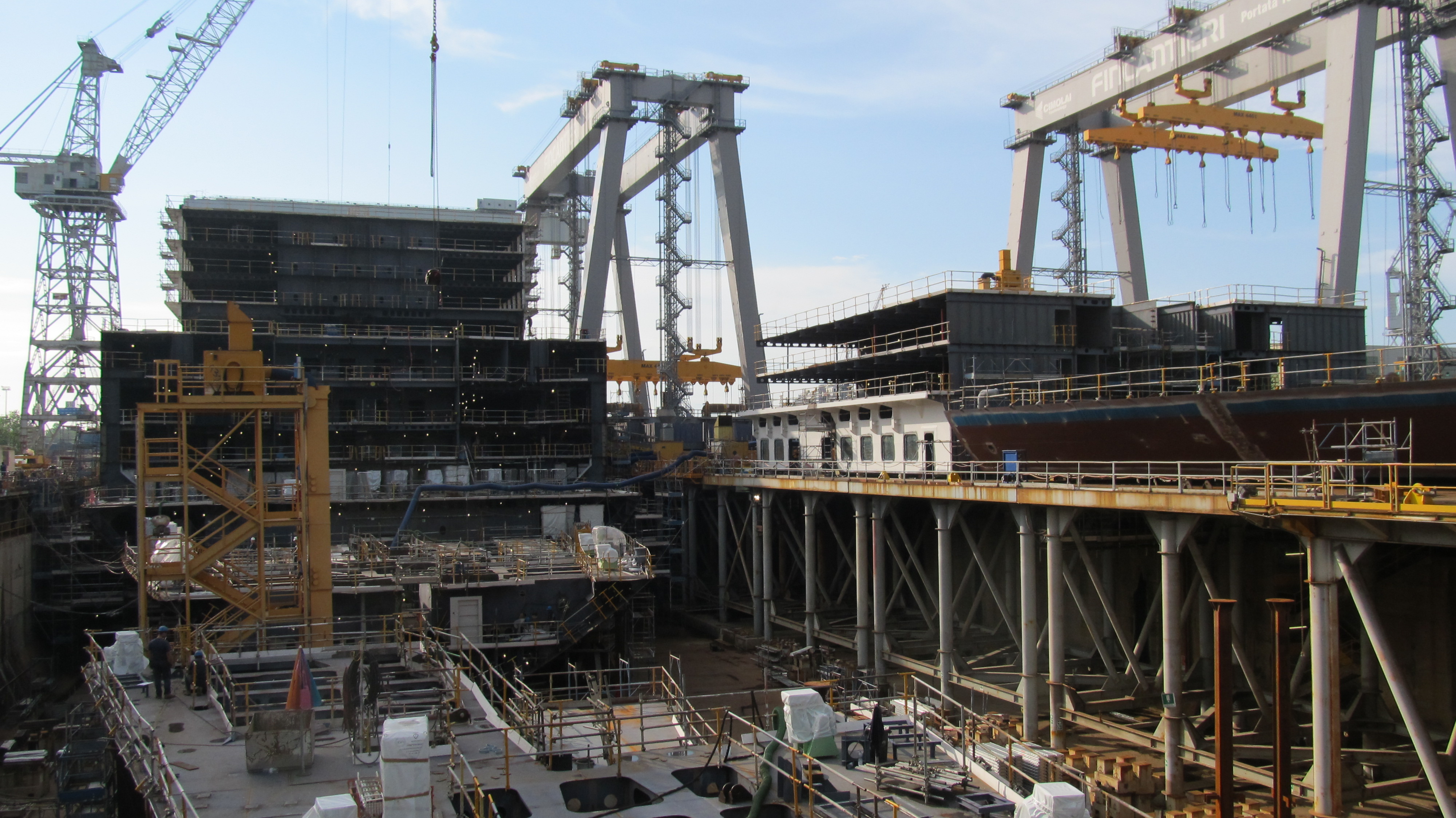
Majestic Princess is Laid Down & Under Construction, 2015

== Service history ==
Majestic Princess embarked on her inaugural cruise on 4 April 2017, a five-day Adriatic voyage round-trip from Rome, visiting Kotor and Corfu. She spent her first month cruising in the Mediterranean before embarking on a 49-day re-positioning voyage to Asia from Rome on 21 May 2017. She arrived in Shanghai for her Chinese debut on 9 July 2017 and was christened that day by Yao Ming and Ye Li.

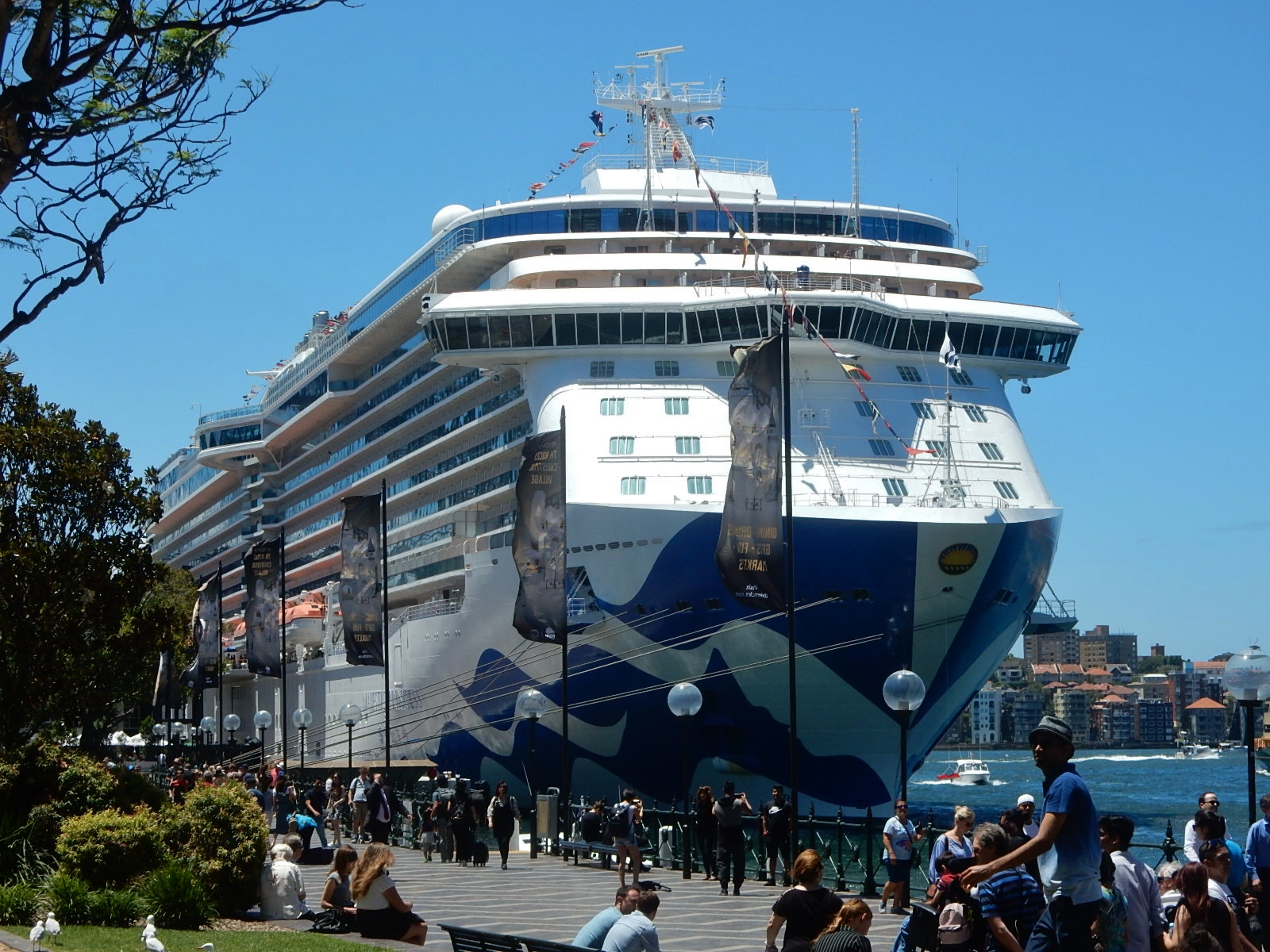
Majestic Princess in Sydney, Australia, 2018

Majestic Princess was originally planned to sail from Shanghai on a year-round basis, but it was later announced that she would begin sailing from Australia for approximately half of a year. She debuted in Sydney in September 2018. Between 2017 and 2021, Majestic Princess operated sailings in East Asia from Keelung between April and August, and in Oceania from Sydney between September and March. Originally slated to debut on the West Coast of the United States in fall 2021 from Los Angeles to sail to the Mexican Riviera and along the California coast, fleet redeployments later scheduled her to debut several months earlier and begin sailing in Alaska from Seattle in summer 2021, with its final Alaska voyage Sept 2024.

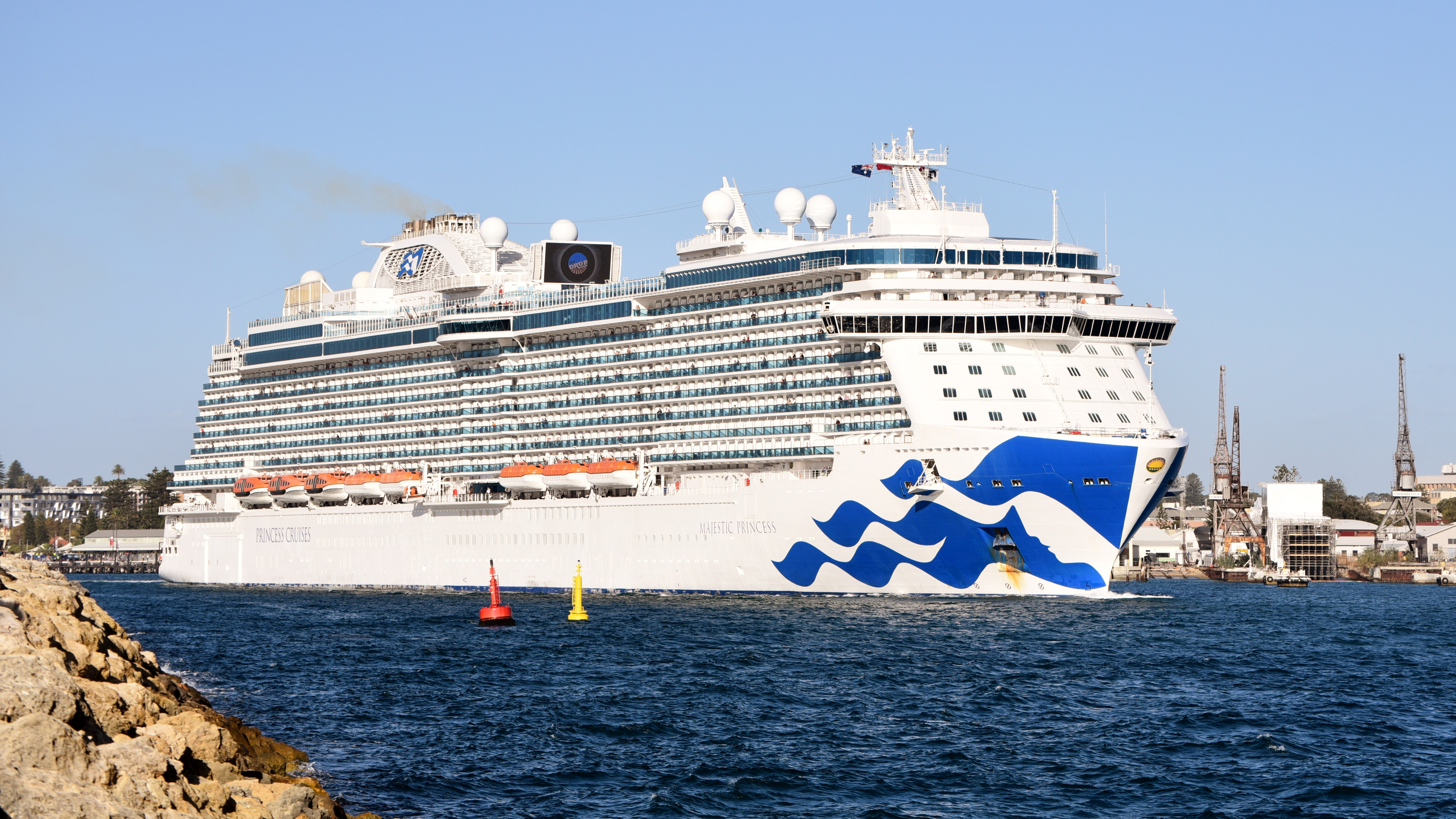
Majestic Princess Departs Fremantle, Western Australia, 2023

In mid-November 2022, the Majestic Princess reported an estimated 800 COVID-19 cases among passengers and crew following a twelve-day tour of New Zealand that included Auckland, Wellington, Dunedin, the Bay of Islands, and Fiordland National Park. The ship departed Auckland on 8 November before docking at Sydney in Australia on 12 November. In 2023, It was announced that Majestic Princess will do Caribbean and Europe cruises in 2025.
