= The Cruise (2016 TV series) =

British reality television series

- Genre: Reality television
- Narrated by: Hugh Bonneville
- Country of origin: United Kingdom
- Original language: English
- No. of series: 5
- No. of episodes: 24

Original release
- Network: ITV
- Release: 3 March 2016 – 10 April 2018

The Cruise is a British reality television series that debuted on ITV on 3 March 2016. It is narrated by Hugh Bonneville. The series includes behind the scenes operations of the Regal Princess, Royal Princess, and Star Princess, all owned by Princess Cruises.

The Cast Emma Morgan, Timothy Gallant and Scott Grayson

== Premise ==
Aired on a weekly basis, the show follows passengers and crew aboard. The series has many reoccurring staff detailing the experiences of their day to day life on board, such as Timothy Gallant, Emma Morgan, Scott Grayson and David McDonald.

== Series overview ==
| Series | Episodes | Start date | End date |
|---|---|---|---|
| 1 | 6 | 3 March 2016 | 7 April 2016 |
| 2 | 6 | 12 January 2017 | 10 February 2017 |
| 3 | 6 | 11 January 2018 | 15 February 2018 |
| 4 | 3 | 1 March 2018 | 15 March 2018 |
| 5 | 3 | 10 April 2018 | 2018 |

== Episodes ==
=== Series 1 (2016) ===
| Episode no. | Airdate | Viewers (millions) | ITV weekly rating |
|---|---|---|---|
| 1 | 3 March 2016 | 4.05 | 15 |
| 2 | 10 March 2016 | 2.99 | 21 |
| 3 | 17 March 2016 | 2.87 | 17 |
| 4 | 24 March 2016 | 3.05 | 17 |
| 5 | 31 March 2016 | 2.98 | 19 |
| 6 | 7 April 2016 | 2.74 | 18 |

=== Series 2 – Sailing the Mediterranean (2017) ===
| Episode no. | Airdate | Viewers (millions) | ITV weekly rating |
|---|---|---|---|
| 1 | 12 January 2017 | 4.22 | 19 |
| 2 | 19 January 2017 | 3.84 | 24 |
| 3 | 26 January 2017 | 3.57 | 28 |
| 4 | 2 February 2017 | 3.43 | 29 |
| 5 | 9 February 2017 | 3.72 | 22 |
| 6 | 10 February 2017 | Under 3.25 | Outside Top 30 |

=== Series 3 – Return to the Mediterranean (2018) ===
| Episode no. | Airdate | Viewers (millions) | ITV weekly rating |
|---|---|---|---|
| 1 | 11 January 2018 | 3.82 | 26 |
| 2 | 18 January 2018 | 3.90 | 28 |
| 3 | 25 January 2018 | 3.68 | 28 |
| 4 | 1 February 2018 | 3.69 | 28 |
| 5 | 8 February 2018 | Under 3.63 | Outside Top 30 |
| 6 | 15 February 2018 | 3.72 | 23 |

=== Series 4 – Voyage to Alaska (2018) ===
| Episode no. | Airdate | Viewers (millions) | ITV weekly rating |
|---|---|---|---|
| 1 | 1 March 2018 | | |
| 2 | 8 March 2018 | | |
| 3 | 15 March 2018 | | |
