= Star Princess (2024) =

Sphere-class cruise ship operated by Princess Cruises

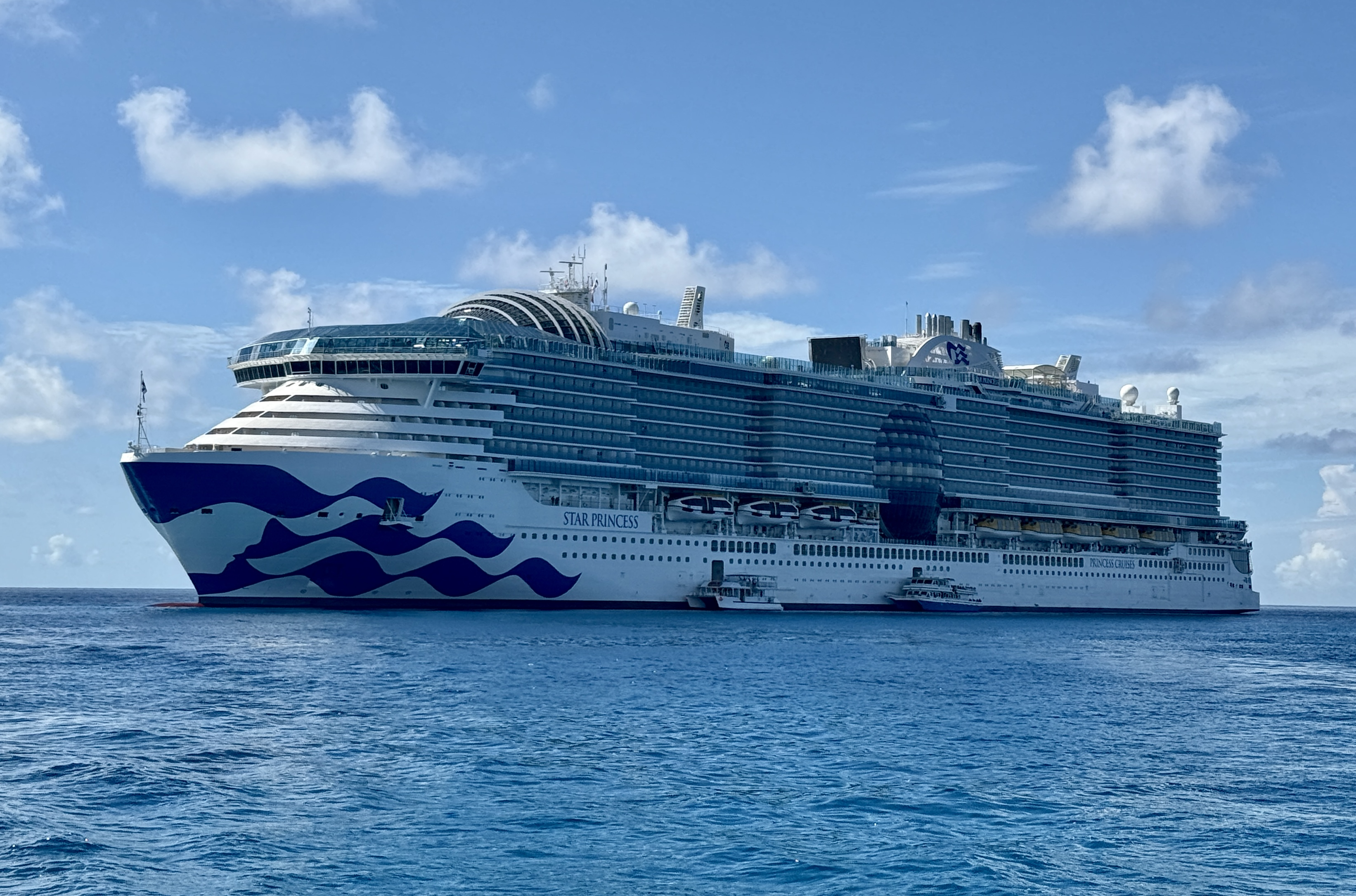

History
- Name: Star Princess
- Owner: Carnival Corporation & plc
- Operator: Princess Cruises
- Port of registry: Hamilton (Bermuda)
- Builder: Fincantieri; Monfalcone, Italy
- Launched: 26 September 2024
- Sponsored by: Camila Alves; Matthew McConaughey
- Christened: 6 November 2025
- Maiden voyage: 4 October 2025
- Identification: Call sign: IL9937; IMO number: 9863120; MMSI number: 247502300
- Status: in active service

General characteristics
- Class & type: Sphere-class cruise ship
- Tonnage: 177,882 GT
- Length: 1,133 ft (345 m)
- Beam: 155 ft (47 m)
- Decks: 20
- Speed: 22 knots (41 km/h; 25 mph)
- Capacity: 4,300
- Crew: 1,547

Star Princess is the second Sphere-class cruise ship operated by Princess Cruises, and is the third ship to sail for the cruise line under this name. Star Princess was ordered from Fincantieri and was constructed at the Fincantieri shipyard in Monfalcone, Italy.

== Design and description ==
Star Princess, the second of the Sphere-class cruise ships is powered by liquefied natural gas (LNG). The vessel, sharing the same basic design as its sister ship, Sun Princess, is measured at 177,882 gross tonnage (GT) and has a length of 1,133 feet (345 m) and a beam of 155 ft (47 m). The cruise ship has a maximum speed of 22 knots (41 km/h; 25 mph). Star Princess has capacity for 4,300 guests. The vessel has 20 decks total of which 17 are passenger-accessible and 10 with cabins on them. There are 2,162 cabins aboard the ship, served by a crew of 1,547. Changes for its sister ship include an increased family/sporting area on its top deck, additional seating in restaurants and slot machines at the on-board casino.

== Construction ==
The vessel is the second largest and second ship powered by LNG to be constructed at Fincantieri's shipyard in Monfalcone, Italy. In April 2024, Princess Cruises announced that the delivery of Star Princess would be delayed by two months. The ship was launched on 26 September 2024. She completed her sea trials in August 2025. Star Princess set sail later that same year.

== Service history ==
The ship was initially planned for entry into service in late July 2025, but after construction delays, the ship set sail on its maiden voyage on 4 October 2025. The ship departed Barcelona for an 11-day cruise of the Mediterranean Sea with stops in Marseille, Rome (Civitavecchia), Naples, Sicily, Cartagena (Spain), and Gibraltar, before returning to Barcelona. The ship redeployed to the Caribbean Sea in November 2025.

The Star Princess had her naming ceremony in Port Everglades on 6 November 2025, christened by Camila Alves and her husband Matthew McConaughey using a giant bottle of their Pantalones Tequila.

In March 2026 the ship was hit by a norovirus outbreak during a Caribbean cruise, where over 150 passengers and crew were sickened.

In April 2026, the ship passed the Panama Canal for the first time.
