= Discovery Princess =

Royal-class cruise ship operated by Princess Cruises

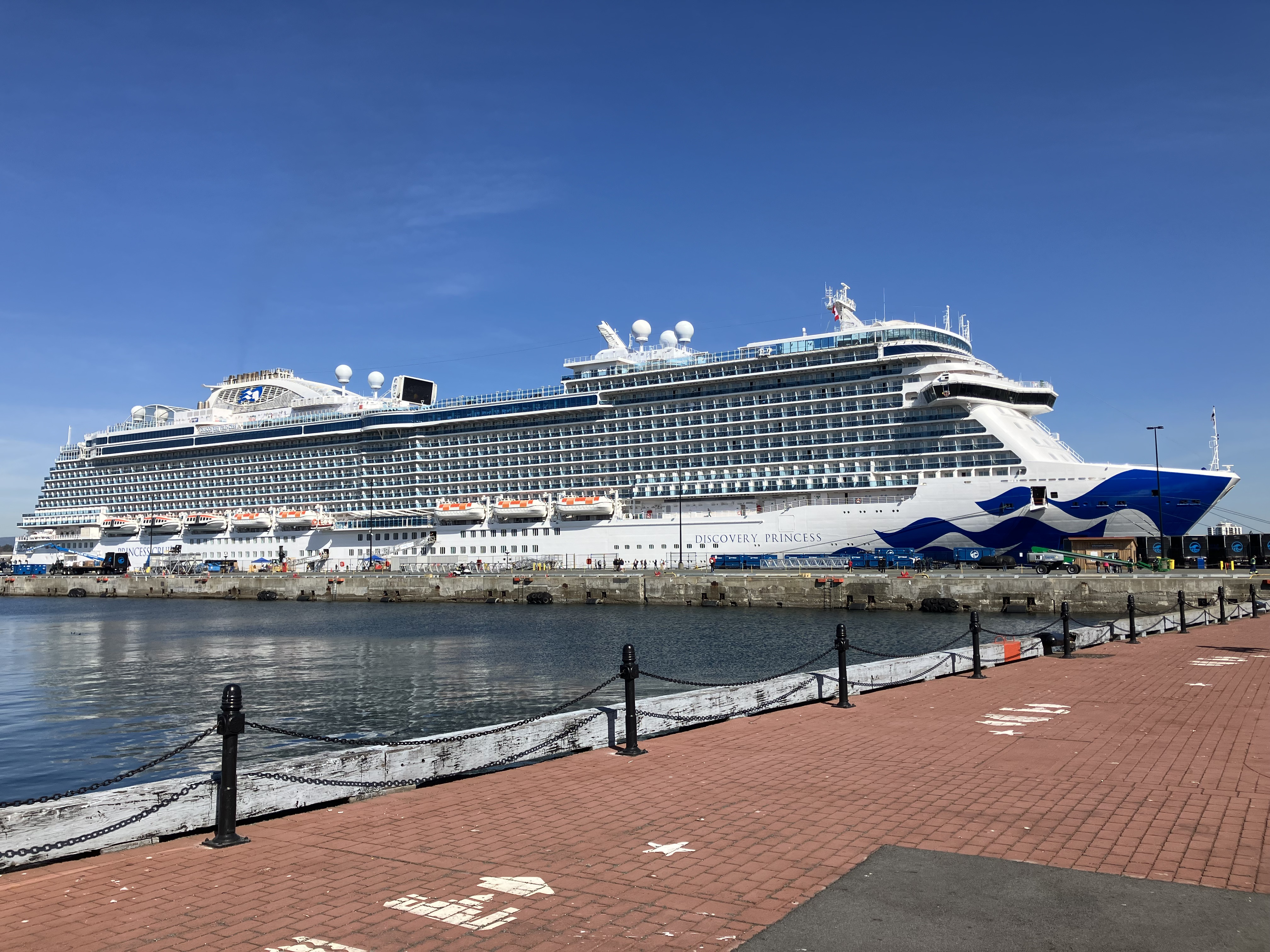
- Discovery Princess at Ogden Point in Victoria, 2023

History

Bermuda
- Name: Discovery Princess
- Owner: Carnival Corporation
- Operator: Princess Cruises
- Port of registry: Hamilton, Bermuda
- Ordered: January 2017
- Builder: Fincantieri; Castellammare di Stabia; Monfalcone
- Yard number: 6290
- Launched: 18 March 2021
- Sponsored by: Randy Fenoli; Alex Guarnaschelli; Adam Savage; Page Turner
- Christened: 29 April 2022
- Completed: 27 January 2022
- Acquired: 28 January 2022
- Maiden voyage: 27 March 2022
- In service: 2022–present
- Identification: Call sign: ZCEW3; IMO number: 9837468; MMSI number: 310812000
- Status: In service

General characteristics
- Class & type: Royal-class cruise ship
- Tonnage: 145,000 GT
- Length: 330 m (1,080 ft)
- Beam: 38.38 m (125.9 ft)
- Draught: 8.49 m (27.9 ft)
- Depth: 11.348 m (37.23 ft)
- Decks: 19
- Installed power: 2 × Wärtsilä 12V46F Diesel generators producing 14,400 kW (19,300 hp) each; 2 × Wärtsilä 14V46F Diesel generators producing 16,800 kW (22,500 hp) each; Total Installed Power: 62,400 kW (83,700 hp)
- Propulsion: 2 × 18,000 kW (24,000 hp)
- Speed: 22 knots (41 km/h; 25 mph) (Service speed); 23 knots (43 km/h; 26 mph) (Maximum speed)
- Capacity: 3,660 passengers
- Crew: 1,346

Discovery Princess is a Royal-class cruise ship operated by Princess Cruises, a subsidiary of Carnival Corporation & plc. The 145,000 GT-vessel was ordered in January 2017 with Italian shipbuilder Fincantieri and her steel-cutting was performed on 14 February 2019 in Castellammare di Stabia, Italy.

Originally expected to begin operations in November 2021, the ship saw her construction and subsequent delivery delayed amid the COVID-19 pandemic and its impact on Fincantieri and Carnival Corporation. She was delivered to Princess on 28 January 2022 and became the company's sixth and final Royal-class cruise ship in the Princess fleet. Discovery Princess operated her week-long inaugural voyage on 27 March 2022 from her debut homeport of Los Angeles to the Mexican Riviera and moved to Seattle during her maiden summer deployment to cruise the Inside Passage.

== Design ==
Discovery Princess measures 145,000 GT and has a length of 330.0 metres (1,082.7 ft), a draft of 8.49 metres (27.9 ft), and a beam of 38.38 metres (125.9 ft). She is powered by a diesel-electric genset system, with four total Wärtsilä engines, producing a total output of 62.4 megawatts (83,700 hp). Main propulsion is via two propellers, each driven by a 18 megawatts (24,000 hp) electric motor. The system gives the vessel a service speed of 21.9 knots (40.6 km/h; 25.2 mph) and a maximum speed of 23 knots (43 km/h; 26 mph). The ship houses 1,830 passenger cabins and 757 crew cabins. Of the 1,830 passenger cabins, 81% have a balcony. The ship has a maximum capacity of 5,800 passengers and crew.

== Construction ==
In January 2017, Carnival Corporation finalized the order for a sixth Royal-class ship for Princess Cruises to be built at Fincantieri's shipyard in Monfalcone, Italy. Initial details revealed the ship would closely resemble her older sister ships, with a guest capacity of 3,660 passengers.

The steel-cutting for the then-unnamed ship was performed on 14 February 2019 at Fincantieri's shipyard in Castellammare di Stabia, Italy. On 4 October 2019, Princess revealed the name of the ship as Discovery Princess. Her 130 metres (430 ft) bow section was launched in Castellamare di Stabia on 31 July 2020 over a two-day period, three months behind schedule due to the COVID-19 pandemic, after which the section was transported to Fincantieri's shipyard in Monfalcone to be assembled with the rest of the ship.

In January 2021, Carnival Corporation announced that it had renegotiated its newbuild contracts for its vessels that were under construction amid the financial constraints imposed on the company by the COVID-19 pandemic; it was arranged to postpone the deliveries of all but one of the new vessels scheduled to be delivered in 2021. Among the vessels impacted was Discovery Princess, whose construction timeline was subsequently extended and forced the delays of her inaugural operations.

On 18 March 2021, Discovery Princess was floated out from the dry dock to begin her interior outfitting. In December, the ship successfully completed her five days of sea trials. She was delivered to Princess in Monfalcone on 28 January 2022. The ship also became the first vessel delivered by Fincantieri in 2022 and the 75th Fincantieri vessel overall to be classified and registered by Lloyd's Register.

Discovery Princess was christened at the Port of Los Angeles on 29 April 2022 by four godparents: designer Randy Fenoli, chef Alex Guarnaschelli, special effects designer Adam Savage, and real estate agent Page Turner.

== Service history ==
Discovery Princess was originally planned to sail her seven-day inaugural voyage on 3 November 2021 from Civitavecchia to Piraeus and operate in the Mediterranean for three weeks before moving to Port Everglades the following month, where she would sail in the Caribbean. She was then scheduled to perform a 50-day circumnavigation cruise around South America in late-2021 to reach her destined homeport of Los Angeles in early-2022, where she would sail along the Mexican Riviera and the California coast. After the ship saw her delivery postponed, the maiden voyage was delayed in September 2021 to 27 March 2022, thus cancelling all pre-planned inaugural festivities.

In order to reach Los Angeles, the ship left the shipyard in Italy in February 2022 by sailing eastwards via the Suez Canal and made a stop in Singapore for additional supplies before embarking on her transpacific voyage. Discovery Princess sailed her week-long inaugural voyage to the Mexican Riviera on 27 March 2022 from Los Angeles, where she was based for one month, before she moved to her maiden summer homeport of Seattle to sail along the Inside Passage.
