= Royal-class cruise ship =

Class of cruise ships operated by Princess Cruises and P&O Cruises

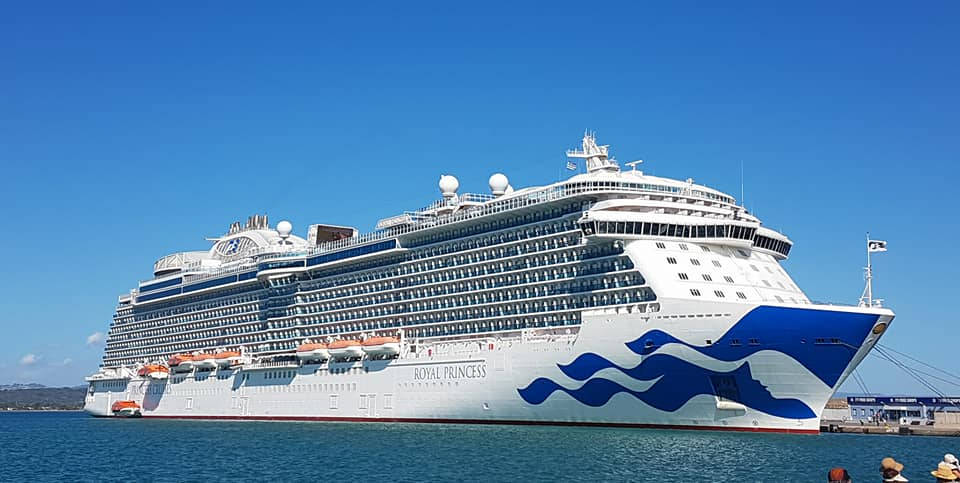
- Royal Princess, the lead vessel of the Royal class.

Class overview
- Builders: Fincantieri (Italy)
- Operators: Princess Cruises, P&O Cruises
- Preceded by: Princess Cruises: Grand class; P&O Cruises: Vista class
- Succeeded by: Princess Cruises: Sphere class; P&O Cruises: Excellence class
- Built: 2011–2021 (planned)
- In service: 2013–present
- Planned: 7
- Completed: 7
- Active: 7

General characteristics
- Type: Cruise ship
- Tonnage: 142,714 GT; 143,730 GT; 144,216 GT; 145,281 GT
- Length: 330 m (1,082 ft 8 in)
- Beam: 38 m (124 ft 8 in)
- Decks: 15
- Capacity: 3,560 passengers; 3,660 passengers

The Royal-class cruise ship is a class of cruise ships constructed by Fincantieri of Italy and operated by Princess Cruises and P&O Cruises, both subsidiaries of Carnival Corporation & plc. There are seven Royal-class ships, with six operated by Princess and one by P&O. The lead vessel of the class, Royal Princess, debuted in June 2013 for Princess. MV Britannia is a derivation of design from Princess' version and debuted in 2015. The final Royal-class ship, the Discovery Princess entered service in spring 2022.

== History ==
=== Orders ===
In early 2010, Fincantieri and Carnival Corporation reached an agreement to build two cruise ships for Princess Cruises. The agreement was subject to the execution of a definitive contract, financing and other customary conditions. The contract was finalized on 4 May 2010. While in the midst of economic downturn, Princess managed to continue the contract with the help of Italian Export Credit Companies, particularly SACE S.p.A.

On 1 June 2011, Carnival Corporation announced an order for a new 141,000-ton cruise ship for P&O Cruises. Estimated at a cost of €559 million, the ship would become the largest ship built specifically for the British market.

On 30 July 2014, Carnival Corporation announced it was ordering the third Royal-class vessel for Princess, at a cost of €600 million.

In March 2015, Carnival Corporation signed a strategic agreement with Fincantieri, which included the fourth and fifth Royal-class vessels for Princess. The contract for these ships were finalized on 2 April 2016.

In January 2017, Carnival Corporation signed a memorandum of agreement with Fincantieri for the sixth and final Royal-class ship for Princess.

=== Planning and design ===
The two first ships of the Royal class were designed to have a gross tonnage of 141,000 GT, with a passenger capacity of 3,600. The new ships were predicted to enter service in mid-2013 and 2014 and were to become the largest new-build vessels to date for Princess Cruises. Design features were planned to evolve from existing Princess staples, such as an expanded "Piazza" central atrium as well as an expansion in balcony accommodations, which would become available across 80% of all staterooms on the vessels.

Following the delivery of the first two Royal-class ships, P&O's Royal-class vessel became the biggest ship built by Fincantieri at her time of delivery. At approximately 144,000 GT, she housed 1,837 staterooms for a total guest capacity of 4,324 passengers, and up to 5,700 total people, including the crew.

The third, fourth, and fifth Princess ships were slated to have a slight increase in gross tonnage, at 143,700 GT, from their older sister ships. The final Princess ship was planned with another increase in gross tonnage to 145,000 GT, with an increase in guest capacity by 100 to 3,660 passengers.

== Summary ==
=== Princess Cruises ===
On 15 March 2011, the name of the first Royal-class vessel was officially announced as Royal Princess. It is the third ship in Princess fleet to carry this name after the last ship left in May 2011. The ship was officially handed over to Princess on 30 May 2013 and christened by Catherine, Duchess of Cambridge on 13 June 2013.

On 28 August 2012, Princess announced that the sister ship to the new Royal Princess would be named Regal Princess. the second ship to have carried that name for Princess. She was delivered to Princess on 11 May 2014 and christened by the original cast of The Love Boat on 5 November 2014.

On 9 October 2015, the third vessel's name, Majestic Princess, was announced. She was originally designed to be purpose-built for the Chinese market and homeported in Shanghai year-round. She was delivered on 30 March 2017 and christened by Yao Ming and Ye Li on 9 July 2017.

On 30 November 2017, Princess announced that the name of the fourth Royal-class vessel would be Sky Princess, the second ship to have carried that name for Princess. She was delivered on 15 October 2019 and christened by NASA astronaut and U.S. Navy Captain Kay Hire and NASA engineer Poppy Northcutt on 7 December 2019.

On 20 August 2018, the fifth Royal-class vessel was announced as Enchanted Princess. Prior to the COVID-19 pandemic, she had been scheduled to debut on 15 June 2020.

On 4 October 2019, Princess revealed that the sixth and final Royal-class vessel would be named Discovery Princess, which was scheduled to begin operating in November 2021.

=== P&O Cruises ===
Two years after P&O's only Royal-class ship was ordered, on 24 September 2013, the ship's name was announced as Britannia. She was delivered to P&O Cruises on 22 February 2015 in Monfalcone. Britannia arrived in Southampton on 6 March 2015, was christened by Queen Elizabeth II on 10 March, and entered service on her maiden voyage on 14 March.

== Ships ==
Ship	Built	Entered service	Gross tonnage	Flag	Notes	Image
Princess Cruises
Royal Princess	2013	June 2013	142,714 GT	Bermuda		
Regal Princess	2014	May 2014	142,714 GT	Bermuda		
Majestic Princess	2017	March 2017	144,216 GT	United Kingdom		
Sky Princess	2019	October 2019	145,281 GT	Bermuda		
Enchanted Princess	2020	September 2020	144,650 GT	Bermuda	Keel laid on 14 February 2019. Floated out on 6 August 2019.	
Discovery Princess	2021	March 2022	144,650 GT	Bermuda	Ordered on 19 January 2017. Steel cut on 14 February 2019. Originally planned for delivery in 2022.	
P&O Cruises
Britannia	2015	March 2015	143,730 GT	United Kingdom	Flagship of P&O Cruises and largest ship built specifically for the British market until 2020.	
