= Sphere-class cruise ship =

LNG powered cruise ship

Sphere class
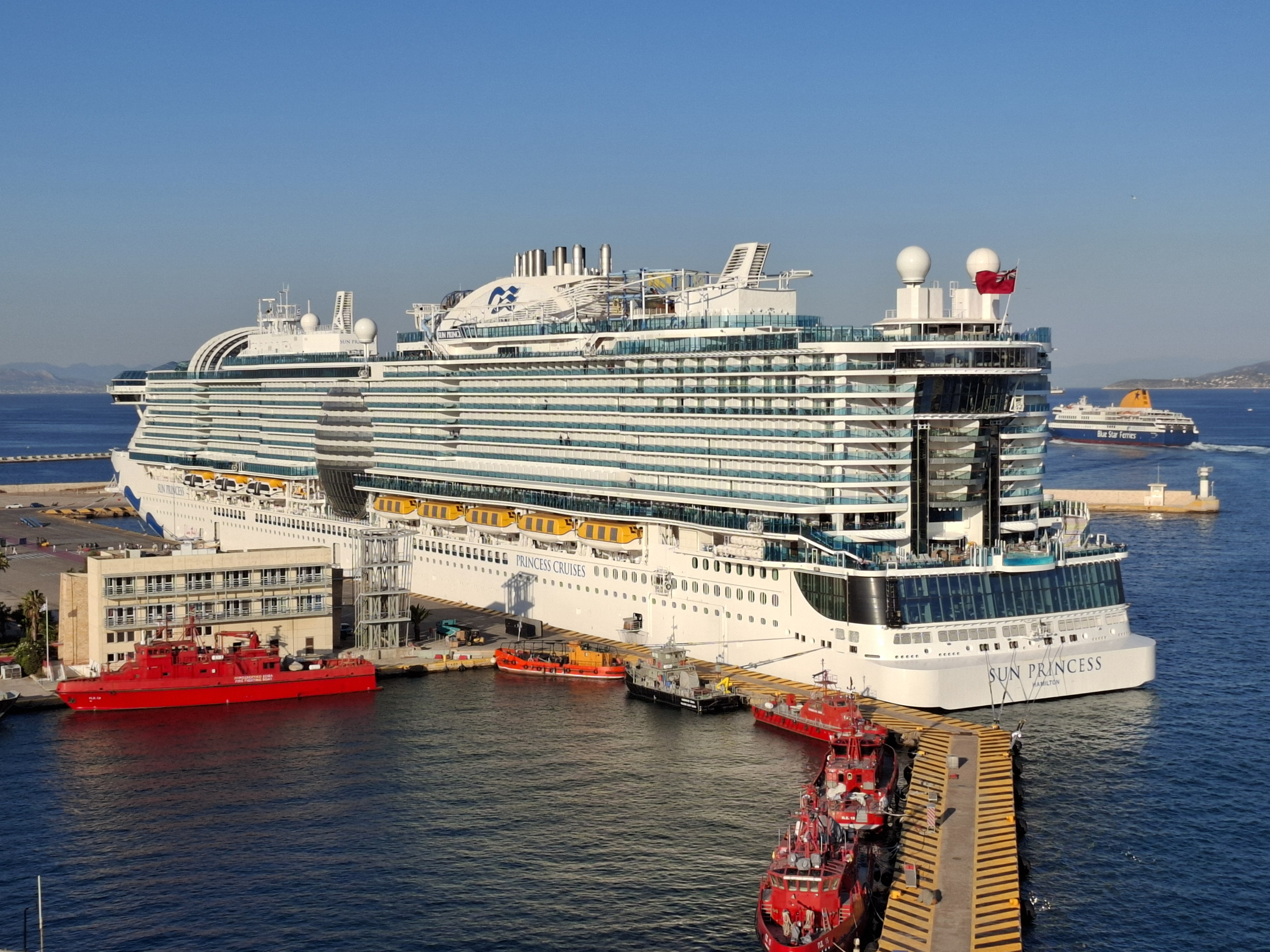
- Lead ship, Sun Princess at Piraeus on 6 July 2024

Class overview
- Builders: Fincantieri, Monfalcone, Italy
- Operators: Princess Cruises
- Preceded by: Royal class
- Built: 2021–2025
- In service: 2024–present
- Planned: 2
- Building: 0
- Completed: 0
- Active: 2

General characteristics
- Type: Cruise ship
- Tonnage: 175,000 GT
- Length: 345.3 m (1,132 ft 10 in)
- Beam: 47 m (154 ft 2 in)
- Decks: 21
- Installed power: Dual-fueled LNG power
- Capacity: 4,300 passengers
- Crew: 1,500

The Sphere-class cruise ship is a class of cruise ships that entered service with Princess Cruises in February 2024. They are the largest ships built for Princess Cruises and the company's first ships powered by liquefied natural gas (LNG). The first ship is named Sun Princess. Her sister ship, Star Princess (2024), launched in 2024.

== Design and construction ==
In July 2018, Fincantieri announced it signed a memorandum of agreement with Princess Cruises, for the construction of two cruise ships with a gross tonnage of 175,000 GT, the largest ships built in Italy. The deliveries were planned for late 2023 and early 2025. The construction was to take place at Monfalcone. The signing of the final contracts was announced in March 2019.

The ships have a capacity of about 4,300 passengers and will be primarily powered by LNG. The vessels measure 345.3 metres (1,132 ft 10 in) long with a beam of 47 m (154 ft 2 in). The ships have 2,157 cabins and are served by a crew of 1,500.

Steel was cut for the first ship by Fincantieri in September 2021. The second ship, at the time, was planned to be completed in 2025. Sun is the largest ship ever built in Italy, eclipsing MSC Cruises' MSC Seashore, which held the record at 170,412 gross tons. The first float-out took place on 8 March 2023. Sun Princess was delivered on 14 February 2024. There were technical issues aboard the ship after entering service, delaying its first port of call.

In April 2024, Princess announced that the delivery of the Star Princess was delayed by two months. The ship was launched in September 2024 for testing and embarked on its maiden voyage in October 2025.

== Ships in class ==
Name	Gross tonnage	Capacity	Builder
Sun Princess	175,000 GT	4,300 passengers	Fincantieri, Monfalcone, Italy
Star Princess	175,000 GT	4,300 passengers	Fincantieri, Monfalcone, Italy
