= Patrick Cox =

Canadian–British fashion designer

- Born: March 19, 1963 (age 63); Edmonton, Alberta, Canada
- Education: London College of Fashion (Formerly Cordwainer's Technical College)
- Labels: Patrick Cox; Wannabe; Charles Jourdan; GEOX Designed by Patrick Cox; Lathbridge
- Awards: Major awards: British Accessories Designer of the year, 1994 & 1995; British Marie Claire Accessory Designer of the Year, 1996; Fashion Medal of Honor by the Footwear Association of New York, 1996

Patrick Cox (born March 19, 1963) is a Canadian-British fashion designer and an eponymous fashion label specializing in the creation of shoes, leather goods and accessories. Cox is most noted for the use of unusual materials and a mixture of avant-garde and traditional styles.

Cox was born in Edmonton, Alberta, to a ballerina Canadian mother and linguist English father. Cox was educated locally, except for periods when his father's work led the family to postings in Nigeria, Chad and Cameroon. Cox eventually graduated from school in Edmonton and moved to Toronto on his own when he was 17.

== Early career ==
At the age of 19, Cox produced his first pair of shoes, for the Toronto-based designer Loucas Kleanthous, who suggested Cox consider a career as a designer. An interest in British fashion led Cox to study at Cordwainer's Technical College, London, a design school that was absorbed into the London College of Fashion in 2000. Cox studied at Cordwainer's from 1983 to 1985. He graduated with merit in July 1985.

During his time as a student in London, Cox probably spent as much time in nightclubs as he did studying. Through his partying Cox became friends with several well-known designers, such as the legendary Vivienne Westwood. As a result, in 1984, Westwood asked Cox to design shoes for her "Clint Eastwood" collection. One of the shoes that Cox created incorporated a 4-inch platform that would become the prototype of a 9-inch pair later worn by supermodel Naomi Campbell, when she famously fell during a Westwood fashion show in Paris, France in 1993. In his second year of college Cox designed and handmade fluorescent fringed moccasins for the celebrated Body Map brand of David Holah and Stevie Stewart.

== Personal life ==
Cox used to date Canadian journalist, entrepreneur, and magazine publisher Tyler Brûlé. Cox funded the launch of Brûlé's Wallpaper magazine that was subsequently sold to Time Warner in 1997. They split up in 1997.

== Working life ==
Cox set up his own company designing shoes in 1985, and in 1986 designed the shoes for John Galliano's "Fallen Angels" collection. Subsequently, Cox launched his own Patrick Cox label, adopting the fleur-de-lys logo. Cox continued to work with Galliano for two more seasons. He also produced the shoes for numerous designers' fashion shows including Anna Sui, John Flett, Alistair Blair and Lanvin Haute Couture to name but a few.

In 1991, Cox opened his first shop opposite the Peter Jones department store in Sloane Square, Chelsea, a well-known fashion district of London. In 1993, Cox marketed his first collection designed for the mass market. This diffusion range called "Wannabe" increased the company's semi annual sales from 2,000 to 200,000 pairs. Cox's signature silhouette was a loafer with a chunky heel, reminiscent of the 1970s disco platforms worn inside Studio 54. Cox has credited his initial interest in moccasins to fellow designer Richard James whom had asked Cox to design him a modern loafer to accessorise one of his early 1990s fashion shows.

In 1994, Cox opened his first Parisian store on the right bank, followed in 1995 by a second store in London on Sloane Street, a new store on New York's Madison Avenue and a second store in Paris on the left bank. During this time, Cox was twice awarded Accessory Designer of the Year at the British Fashion Awards. 1998 saw Cox move his design office and production from the UK to Civitanova, in the Italian Marche, an area known for shoe manufacture.

From his early association with Vivienne Westwood onwards, Cox developed a cult like status in Japan and in 1996 signed a 10-year licensing deal with leading Japanese luxury department store group Isetan. This deal saw the opening of more than 40 shop in shops across Japan and a whole range of licensed Japanese products including ready-to-wear, bags, jewellery and watches.

Cox was approached by the French fashion footwear house Charles Jourdan, and in January 2003 he was appointed Creative Director, his brief being to rejuvenate the brand. After 3 years of successful collaboration, Cox decided to move on to concentrate on the development of his own label.

The Hong Kong duty free company King Power Group took a controlling interest in the Patrick Cox company in 2006. Cox left the eponymous firm the following year and the entire business, except for a few continuing Japanese licenses was closed in 2008.

In September 2010, Cox opened 'Cox Cookies & Cake', a pâtisserie in London's Soho district, with Eric Lanlard to whom he was introduced by Elizabeth Hurley. In keeping with the area's history of seedy business, the décor was black and neon while the staff wore studded leather aprons. Delicacies included titty and bum cupcakes along with his mother Maureen's recipe for traditional Canadian Nanaimo bars. After two successful years trading Cox decided to close the business to return to shoe design.

In 2011, Cox was approached to design for the Italian shoe giant Geox. The resulting GEOX Designed by Patrick Cox capsule collection incorporated his witty ironic British take on design.

In 2016, Cox returned to fashion with his Lathbridge collection of shoes and leather goods. The brand name is Cox's middle name and the company logo is the bulldog, inspired by Cox's pet English bulldogs Caesar and Brutus.

In 2017, Cox moved from London to Ibiza, several years after losing control of his eponymous fashion business. During the following years he began exploring psychedelics and 5-MeO-DMT. Cox has said that these experiences contributed to a change in his outlook and helped him reconnect with his creativity.

Cox later returned to fashion with Doors of Perception, an Ibiza-based clothing, footwear and accessories label. The brand takes its name from Aldous Huxley’s 1954 book The Doors of Perception, and its designs draw on psychedelic and spiritual imagery, including eyes, mushrooms and other symbolic motifs. The label began with embroidered sweatshirts produced in Ibiza and subsequently expanded into accessories and footwear. Cox has described the project as a more personal, small-scale approach to fashion, operating outside the conventional seasonal fashion system.

Cox’s psychedelic experiences, his work as a facilitator of 5-MeO-DMT ceremonies, and his return to fashion through Doors of Perception have been the subject of profiles in The Guardian, The Financial Times and The Times, as well as interviews on Changes with Annie Macmanus and Begin Again with Davina McCall.
