= Eric Lanlard =

French pâtissier and celebrity chef (May 1 born 1968)

Éric Lanlard
- Born: 1 May 1968; Plomelin, Brittany France
- Culinary career
- Current restaurant: Cake Boy
- Previous restaurant: Laboratoire 2000
- Television shows: Glamour Puds; Baking Mad with Eric Lanlard
- Website: www.cake-boy.com

Éric Lanlard (born 1968) is a French pâtissier and celebrity chef. He was previously a chef for the French Navy, but moved to the UK in 1989 to work with Albert and Michel Roux. He left their company in 1995 to set up his first business, Laboratoire 2000, which was replaced by his shop Cake Boy in 2005. He had previously appeared on British television in guest spots on a number of channels before Channel 4 gave him his own television series, Glamour Puds and Baking Mad with Eric Lanlard.

== Biography ==
Born in Plomelin, Brittany, Lanlard has described his original inspiration to become a pâtissier was at the age of five, where he would stare through the windows of a patisserie in his town Quinper called "Le Grand". He would go on to work there at the age of 18, training as a pastry chef. Lanlard has also stated that the French legend Chef Antonin Careme was an inspiration He moved to Luxembourg to become a chocolatier at Arens-Scheer. After his apprenticeship, he was then called up for national service, joining the French Navy where he served on board the cruiser Jeanne d'Arc while it was the flagship. While on board, his cooking impressed the French President François Mitterrand, who gave Lanlard a pair of gold cufflinks. Leaving the Navy, he was recruited by the Roux brothers, Albert and Michel and moved to the UK in 1989. He became their head pastry chef within two years before leaving to set up his own business in 1995. Lanlard still maintains links with the Roux family and makes a yearly "pilgrimage" to Michel Roux Jr.'s Le Gavroche in London. Laboratoire 2000, his first business which opened in 1995, was rebranded in 2005 as Cake Boy. The shop itself doubles as a cookery school, and the premises from where Lanlard operate it were opened by UK TV celebrity Amanda Holden, in an area which Lanlard was familiar with as when he worked with the Roux brothers, it was the same area they were based in at the time.

Among Lanlard's publicised works are a croquembouche for the wedding of Madonna and Guy Ritchie, and wedding cakes for Elizabeth Hurley and Claudia Schiffer; as well as both the first birthday cake of Brooklyn Beckham, son of David Beckham, and the cake for the Queen Mother's 101st birthday which featured two Corgis wearing tiaras. His television appearances have included guest spots on UKTV Food, the BBC show Girls on Top and ITV's This Morning, and he has had his own television shows on Channel 4 called Baking Mad with Eric Lanlard, and Glamour Puds. He has twice been named Continental Patissier of the Year at the British Baking Awards. Lanlard is now part of the "Food Heroes" for P&O cruises, looking after signature Afternoon Teas on board the whole fleet, as well as running classes and creating recipes. Lanlard is also a Food Ambassador for Marriott International, creating an "Afternoon Tea" concept around the world across their high end brands, like the St Regis & Luxury Collection. Lanlard's latest venture is with Virgin Atlantic, where he has designed an Afternoon Tea concept across all airline cabins and in Virgin Atlantic Clubhouse airport lounges.

== Personal life ==
After moving to the UK, Lanlard lived in Putney, but moved to Battersea in 2004.

He has also signed to go on a sub-orbital spaceflight with Virgin Galactic. He has stated in interviews that despite his trade, he doesn't have a sweet tooth and that his weakness is cheese.

== Bibliography ==
- Glamour Cakes (2008)
- Home Bake (2010)
- Cake Boy (2011)
- Cupcakes from Cox Cookies and Cakes (2011) Coauthor Patrick Cox
- Master Cakes: Inspirational step-by-step recipes from a master patissier (2011)
- Tart It Up! Sweet and Savoury Tarts and Pies (2012)
- Chocolat: Seductive Recipes for Bakes, Desserts, Truffles and Other Treats (2013)
