= Sun Princess (2024) =

Sphere-class cruise ship operated by Princess Cruises

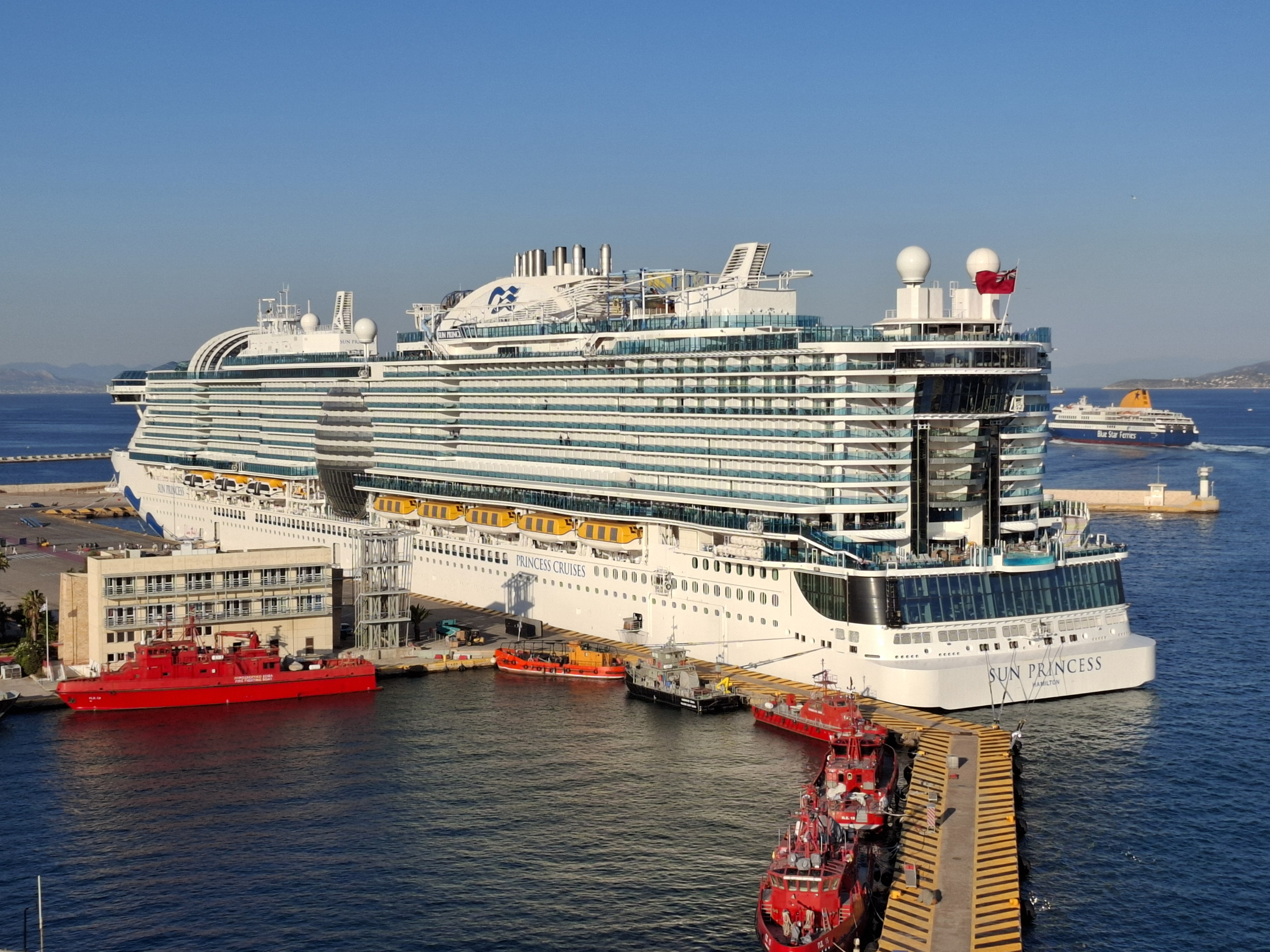
- Sun Princess at Piraeus, 2024

History

Bermuda
- Name: Sun Princess
- Owner: Carnival Corporation & plc
- Operator: Princess Cruises
- Port of registry: Hamilton, Bermuda
- Ordered: 23 July 2018
- Builder: Fincantieri; Monfalcone, Italy
- Laid down: 8 March 2023
- Sponsored by: Hannah Waddingham
- Christened: 23 April 2024
- Acquired: 28 February 2024
- Maiden voyage: 28 February 2024
- In service: 2024-present
- Identification: Call sign: ZCHD6; IMO number: 9863118; MMSI number: 310841000
- Status: In service

General characteristics
- Class & type: Sphere-class cruise ship
- Tonnage: 177,882 GT
- Length: 1,133 ft (345 m)
- Beam: 155 ft (47 m)
- Decks: 21
- Speed: 22 kn (41 km/h)
- Capacity: 4,300
- Crew: 1,600

Sun Princess is a Sphere-class cruise ship operated by Princess Cruises, a subsidiary of Carnival Corporation & plc, and is the third ship to sail for the cruise line under this name. Sun Princess was ordered on 23 July 2018 from Fincantieri and constructed at the Fincantieri shipyard in Monfalcone, Italy; it had her maiden voyage in 2024. It is the largest ship in Princess' current fleet.

== History ==
=== Construction and delivery ===
The final contract of the first two Sphere-class vessels was signed in March 2019. In March 2023, the ship was floated out in Monfalcone, Italy. Sun Princess was seen completing her sea trials in November 2023 and January 2024.

She had her naming ceremony in the Port of Barcelona being named by Hannah Waddingham on 23 April 2024. The Ted Lasso actress would later participate in an ad campaign where she performs the theme to The Love Boat television series aboard the ship. Two weeks before her originally expected delivery, a mutual agreement to delay her delivery was announced. The circumstances were not explained. Sun Princess's maiden voyage was delayed from 8 February to 28 February 2024.

=== Operational history ===
Sun Princess sailed her maiden voyage on 28 February 2024, setting sail in the Mediterranean. The ship moved to Florida for Caribbean sailings in October of that year, undergoing a refurbishment before its US debut that moved and reconfigured many of the onboard restaurants and removed attractions from the Park19 family area.

== Design and specifications ==
Sun Princess is the first ship of the Sphere class. She measures 1,133 feet (345 m) in length, with a beam of 155 feet (47 m). The Sphere class has been a major update to the overall design of Princess's ships, featuring a more modern look. Sun Princess also features new glass, dome-like elements visible from the exterior of the vessel. Sun Princess is the first Princess ship to be fueled by liquefied natural gas (LNG) which will persist throughout the Sphere class.
