= Regal Princess (2013) =

Royal-class cruise ship operated by Princess Cruises

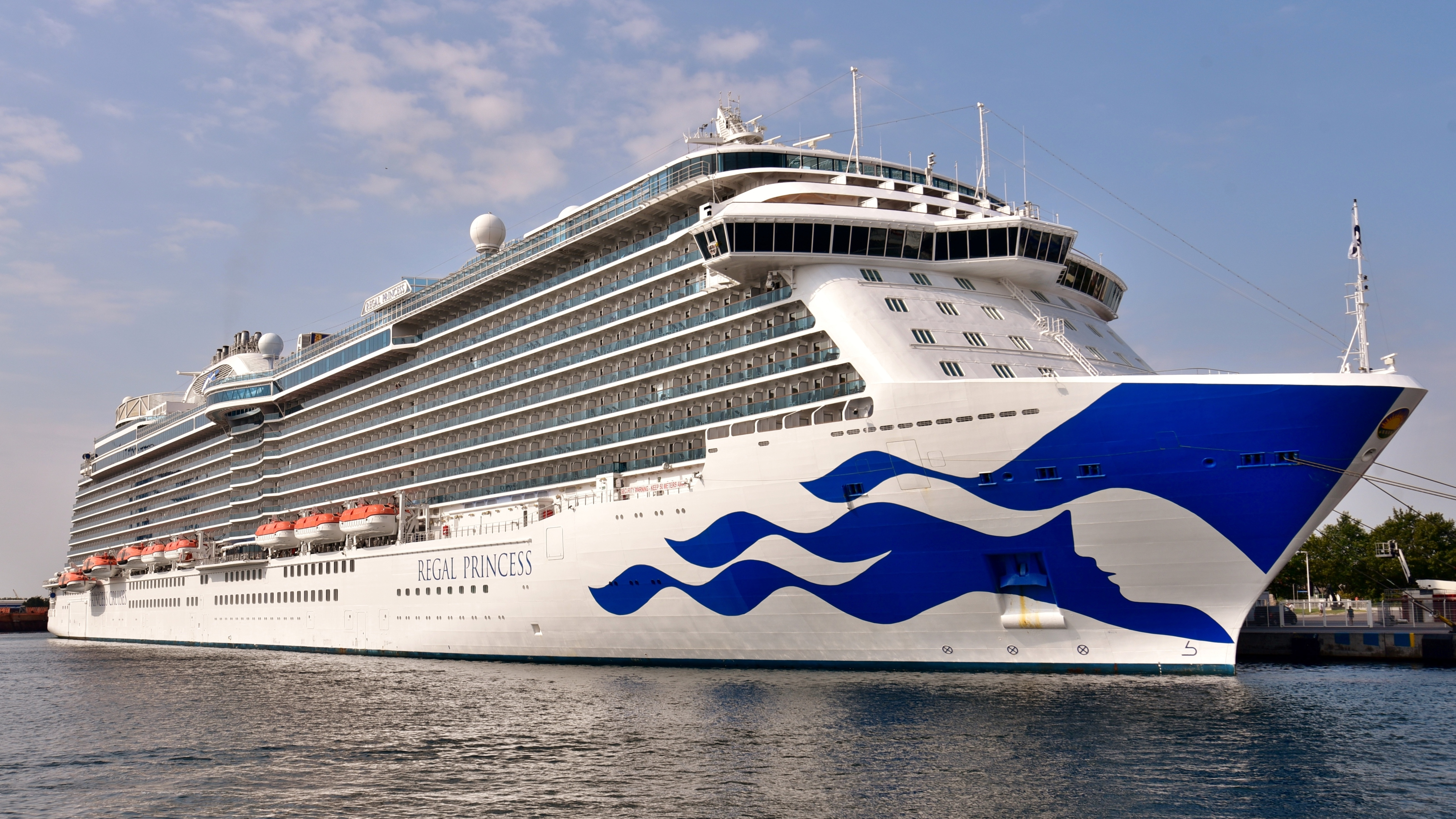
- Regal Princess in Warnemünde, 2019

History

Bermuda
- Name: Regal Princess
- Owner: Carnival Corporation & plc
- Operator: Princess Cruises
- Port of registry: Hamilton, Bermuda
- Ordered: 4 May 2010
- Builder: Fincantieri; Monfalcone, Italy
- Laid down: 28 August 2012
- Launched: 26 March 2013
- Sponsored by: Fred Grandy; Bernie Kopell; Ted Lange; Gavin MacLeod; Lauren Tewes; Jill Whelan
- Christened: 5 November 2014
- Acquired: 11 May 2014
- Maiden voyage: 20 May 2014
- In service: 2014–present
- Identification: Call sign: ZCEK6; IMO number: 9584724; MMSI number: 310674000
- Status: In service

General characteristics
- Class & type: Royal-class cruise ship
- Tonnage: 142,714 GT
- Displacement: 68,161 T Lightships
- Length: 330 m (1,082 ft 8 in)
- Beam: 47 m (154 ft 2 in)
- Height: 66 m (216 ft 6 in)
- Draft: 8.57 m (28 ft 1 in)
- Decks: 19
- Installed power: 2 × Wärtsilä 12V46F Diesel generators producing 14,400 kW (19,300 hp) each; 2 × Wärtsilä 14V46F Diesel generators producing 16,800 kW (22,500 hp) each; Total Installed Power: 62,400 kW (83,700 hp)
- Propulsion: 2 × 18,000 kW (24,000 hp)
- Speed: 22 knots (41 km/h; 25 mph) (Service speed); 22.9 knots (42.4 km/h; 26.4 mph) (Maximum speed)
- Capacity: 4,250 passengers
- Crew: 1,350

Regal Princess is a Royal-class cruise ship operated by Princess Cruises, a subsidiary of Carnival Corporation & plc, and is the second ship to sail for the cruise line under this name. Regal Princess, as well as her sister ship Royal Princess, were ordered on 17 February 2010 from Fincantieri and were constructed at the Fincantieri shipyard in Monfalcone, Italy, and debuted in 2014.

== History ==
=== Construction and delivery ===
The final contract for the first two Royal-class vessels was signed on 4 May 2010. On 28 August 2012, the ship's keel was laid in Monfalcone and the name of the ship was also officially announced as Regal Princess. Her float-out ceremony was conducted on 26 March 2013 and she was floated free from the builder's dry dock on 29 March 2013 and then moored alongside the outfitting pier, where construction continued. Regal Princess successfully completed her sea trials in the Adriatic Sea from 16 to 21 April 2014.

Theme from "Love Boat" as sounded by the ship's horn

Construction progressed faster than expected and the ship arrived 13 days ahead of schedule. She was delivered to Princess Cruises on 11 May 2014 in a ceremony at Fincantieri's shipyard in Monfalcone. She had her official naming ceremony in Fort Lauderdale, Florida, on 5 November 2014 and was officially christened by the original cast of The Love Boat: Gavin MacLeod, Fred Grandy, Ted Lange, Bernie Kopell, Lauren Tewes, and Jill Whelan.

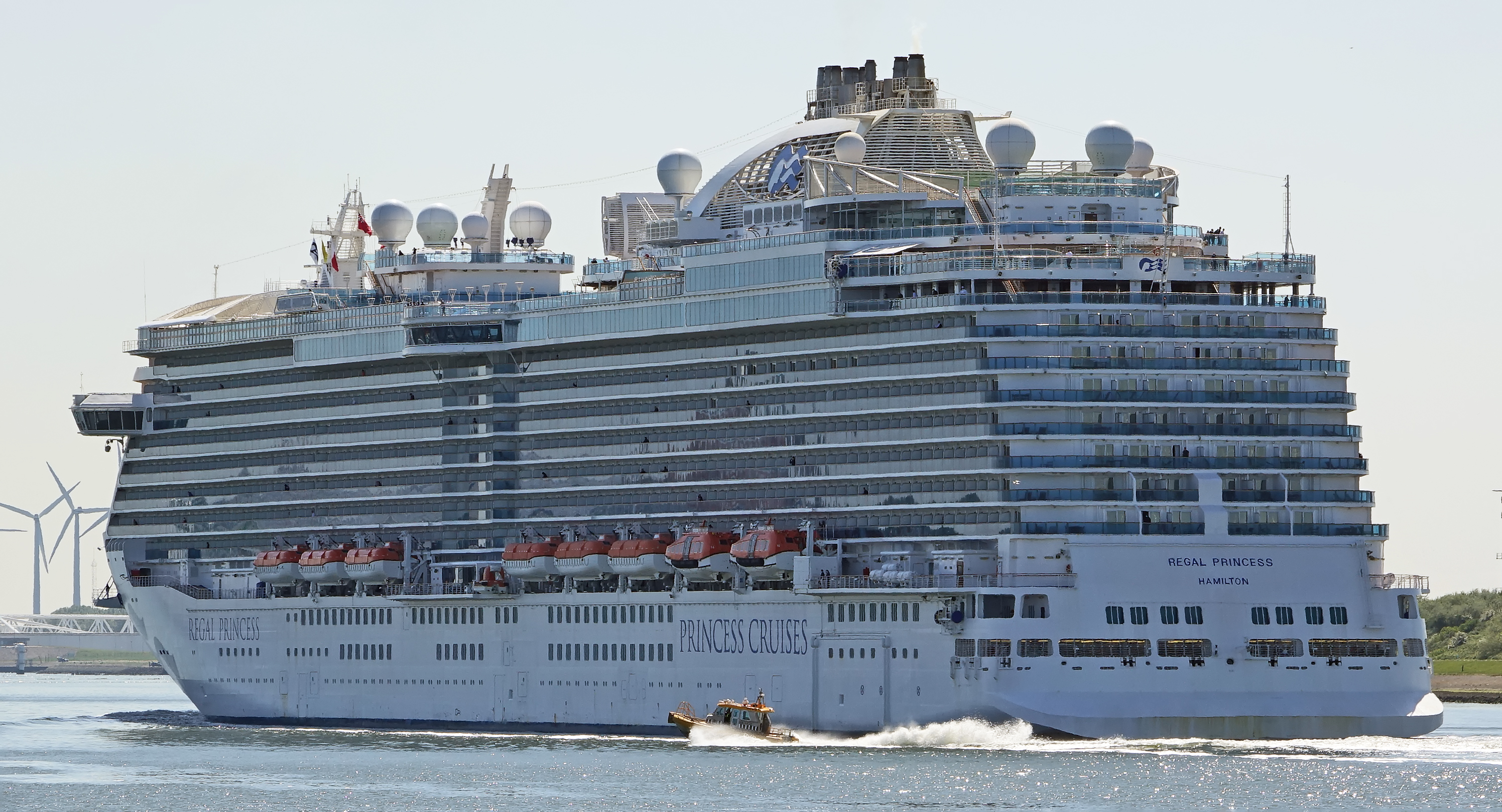
Regal Princess near Rotterdam, 2020

=== Operational history ===
The debut of Regal Princess was conducted earlier than originally scheduled, due to an earlier delivery. The maiden voyage had been scheduled for 2 June 2014, but was moved up to 20 May. The ship conducted a four-night pre-inaugural cruise from 16 to 20 May 2014 from Trieste that visited Kotor. The maiden voyage departed from Venice on 20 May 2014 for Corfu, Mykonos, and an overnight call in Istanbul. She spent her inaugural season in the Mediterranean before departing Venice on 17 October 2014 to reposition to Port Everglades for her American debut, sailing Eastern Caribbean itineraries.

From 2014 to 2020, she sailed the Caribbean during the winter months from Port Everglades and the Baltic region in Northern Europe during the summer season, with five-to-seven-day voyages to the New England coast and the Maritimes from New York during the fall.

In summer 2020, she was scheduled to operate her first season in the British Isles before repositioning to Australia in fall 2020 for her maiden season in Oceania. However, due to the COVID-19 pandemic, all British Isles voyages were cancelled. In summer 2021, Regal Princess was set to debut in Seattle to cruise her first Alaska season, but fleet redeployments later scheduled her to return to Europe and homeport in Southampton during that time frame. Ever since redeployment, Regal Princess has been doing European and Caribbean Cruises every year, with the exception of 2026 where it will do Caribbean cruises year round. In 2022, Regal Princess was the setting of the American and Australian versions of the reality show The Real Love Boat, which aired on CBS and Network 10.

=== Media ===
It featured as the location of the first two series of television show "The Cruise: Fun-Loving Brits at Sea"

== Design and specifications ==
As a sister ship to Royal Princess, Regal Princess shares many of the same dimensions, features, and overall design. The ship measures 142,714 gross tonnage (GT), has a length of 330.0 metres (1,082 ft 8 in), a draught of 8.5 metres (27 ft 11 in), and a beam of 38.4 metres (126 ft 0 in). She is powered by a diesel-electric genset system, with four total Wärtsilä engines, producing a total output of 62.4 megawatts (83,700 hp). Main propulsion is via two propellers, each driven by a 18 megawatts (24,000 hp) electric motor. The system gives the vessel a service speed of 22 knots (41 km/h; 25 mph) and a maximum speed of 22.9 knots (42.4 km/h; 26.4 mph). The ship houses 1,780 passenger cabins and 751 crew cabins. Of the 1,780 passenger cabins, 81% have a balcony. The ship has a maximum capacity of 5,600 passengers and crew.

Describing the style that inspired much of the interior design on Regal Princess, Giacomo Mortola, head architect at ship design firm GEM, explained:

Mainly it is a combination of warm, elegant tones that convey a feeling of comfort and sophistication. One example – a favourite architect of mine, Frank Lloyd Wright, used wood, bronze, and leather-covered walls, and I used these materials to impart the look and feel of the aft dining room. These materials were also used in the entertainment areas including the Princess Theater, Vista Lounge, and TV Studio contributing to the acoustic quality in these areas.

Notable features aboard the ship include a multi-level atrium, a theater, various dining rooms and restaurants, and pools.

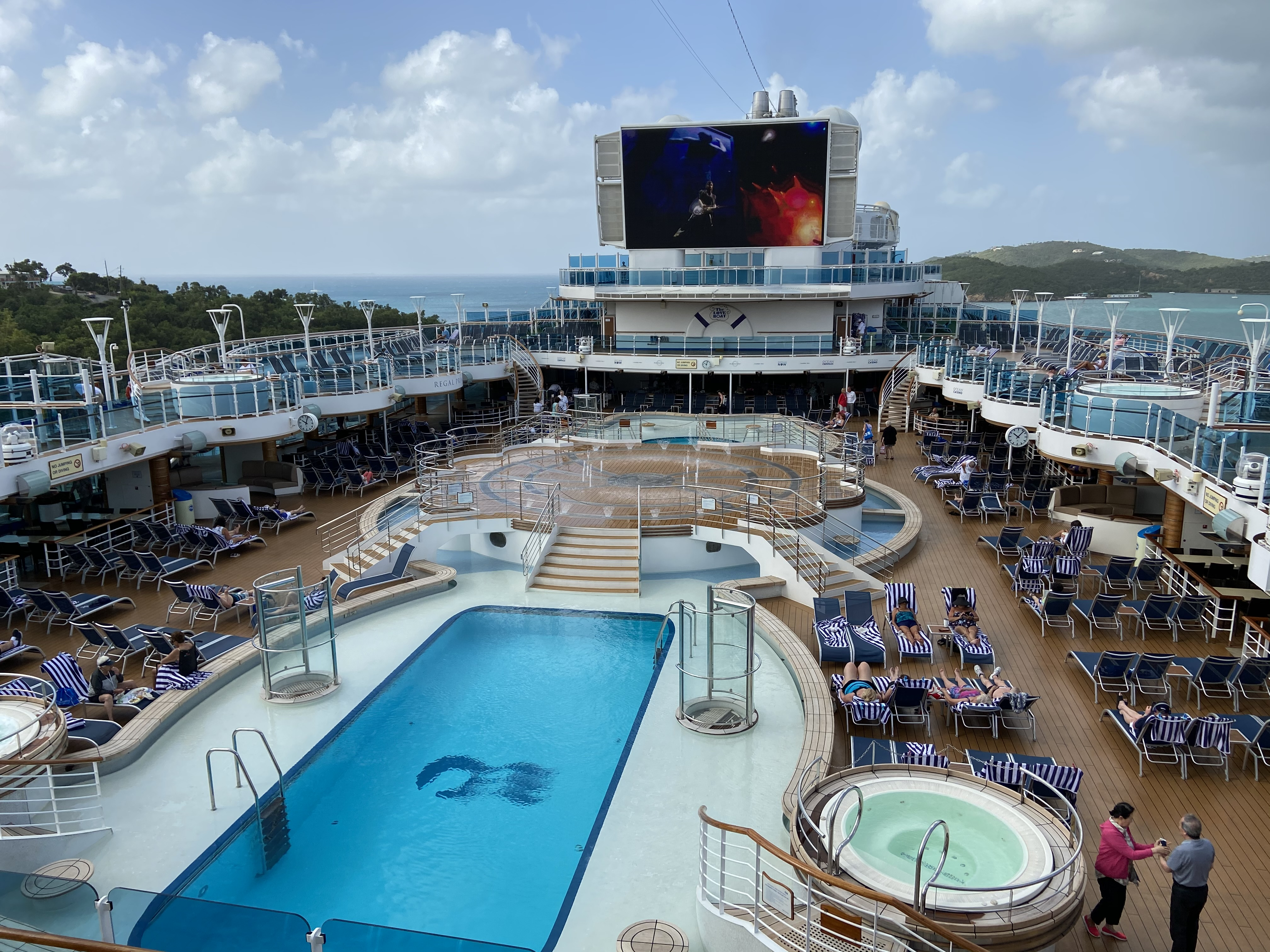
Pool deck

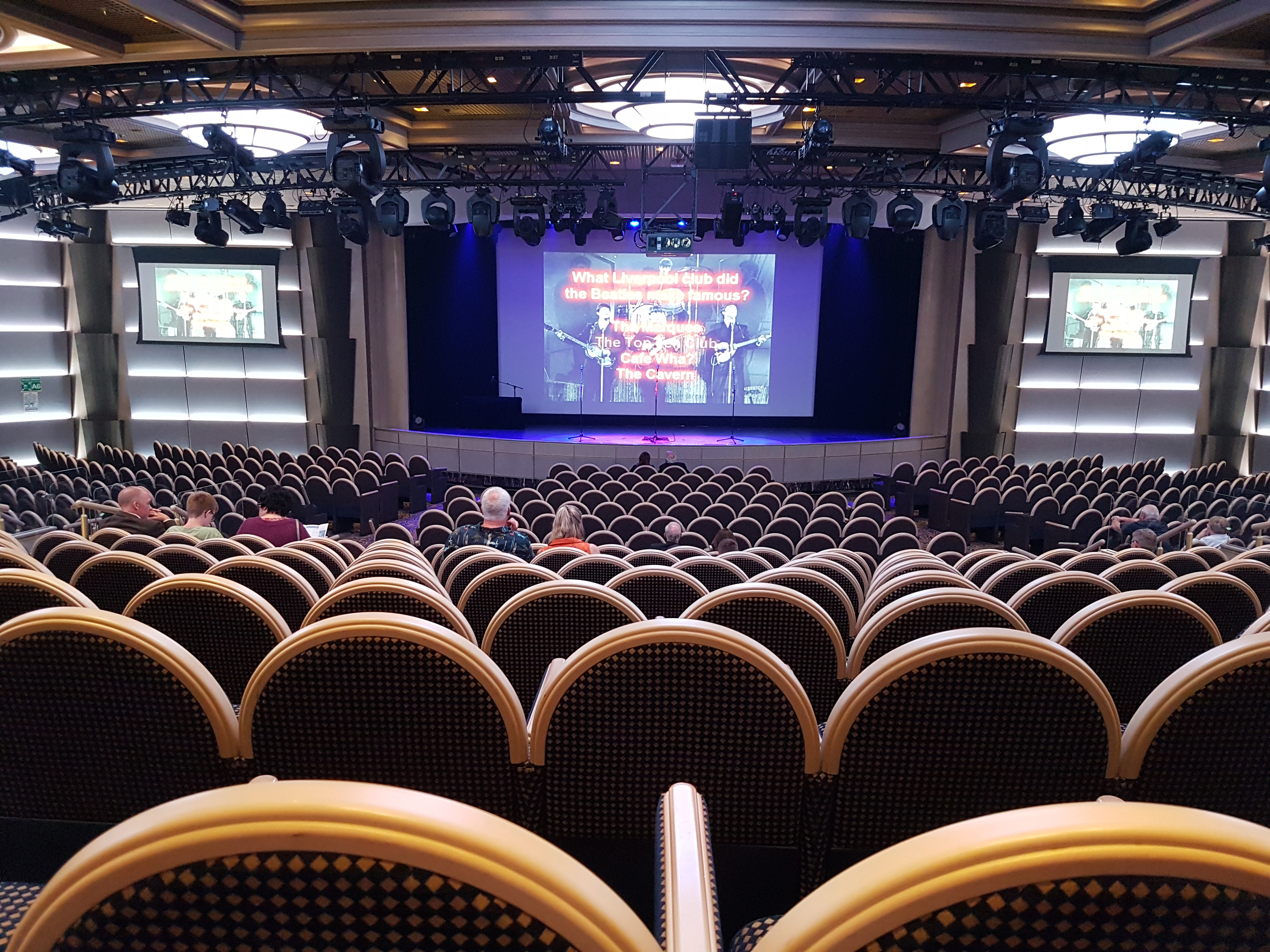
Theater

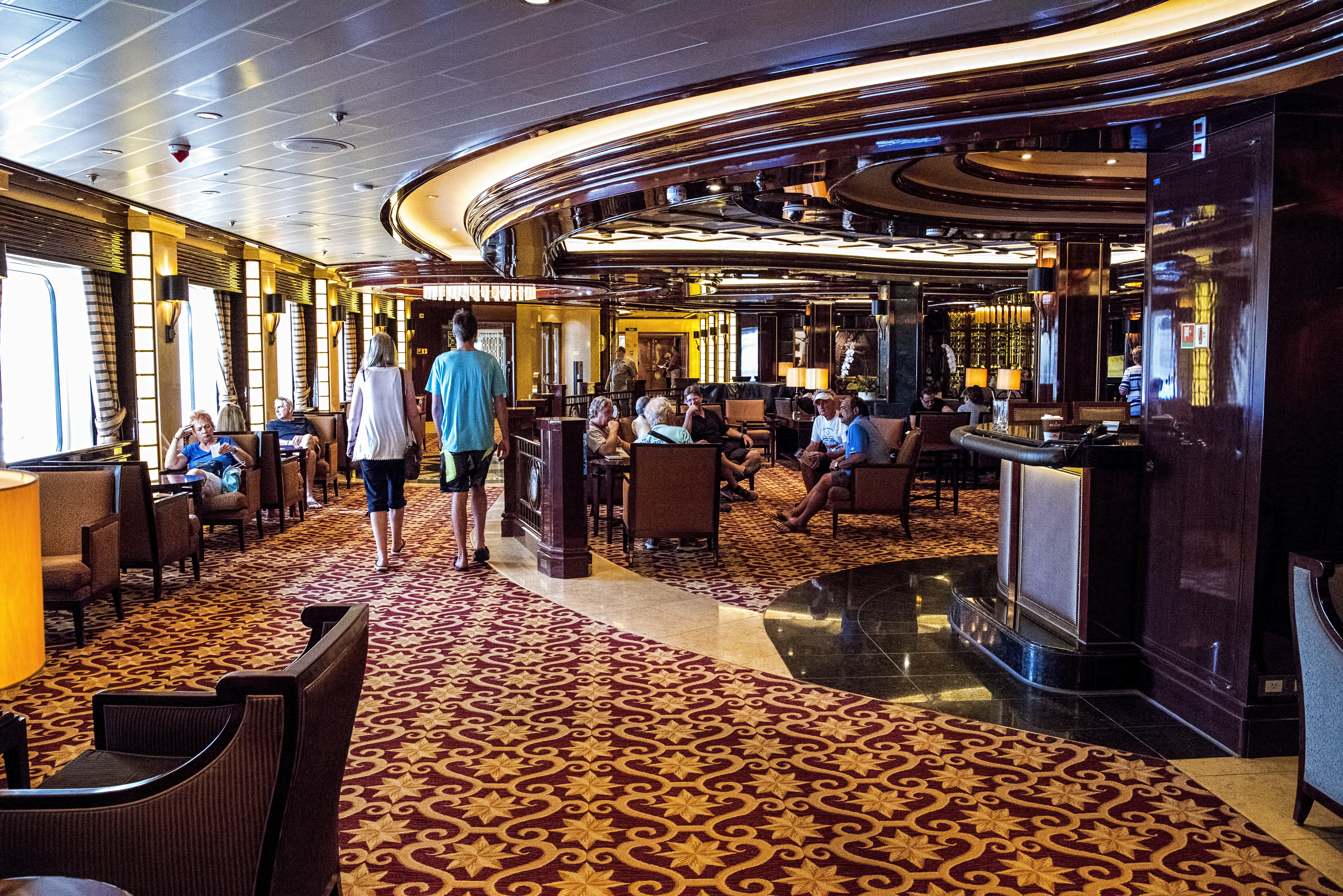
Lounge

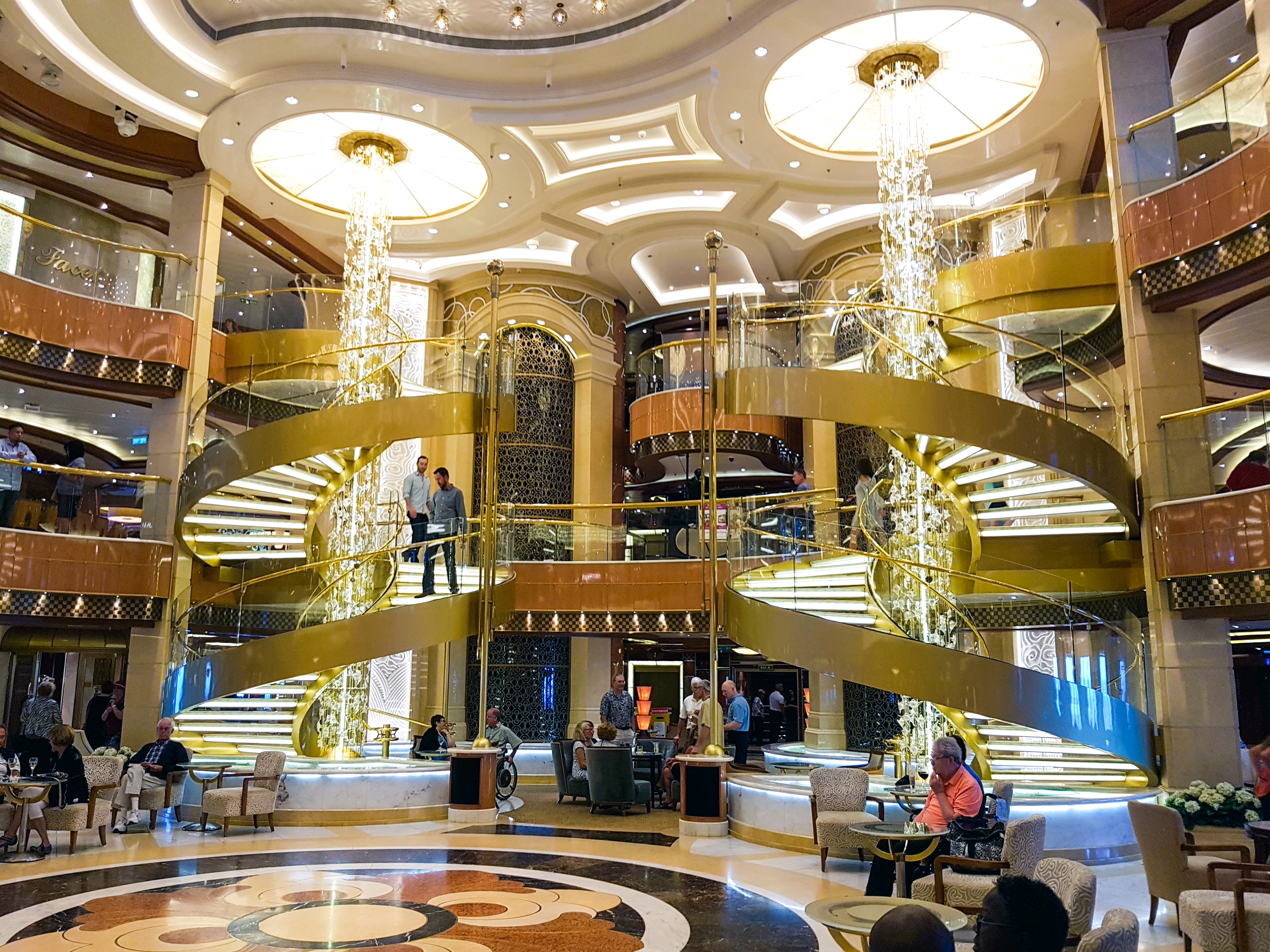
Atrium

== Incidents ==
=== March 2019 rescue ===
On 5 March 2019, Regal Princess rescued two survivors after their private plane crashed into the Caribbean near Grand Turk. The cruise line released a statement, saying "Princess Cruises can confirm that upon request from the U.S. Coast Guard, Regal Princess assisted in the rescue of two U.S. citizens whose private aircraft went down southeast of Grand Turk in the Caribbean Sea. Both people rescued sailed onboard Regal Princess as the ship sailed to the next port of call St. Thomas."

=== COVID-19 pandemic ===
On 7 March 2020, two crew members of Regal Princess were tested and the docking of the ship at Port Everglades in Fort Lauderdale, Florida, U.S., was delayed for about a day while waiting for test results. The tests were negative, and the crew did not have respiratory complications, so the ship was allowed to dock.

On 10 May 2020, a 39-year-old female Ukrainian crew member of Regal Princess died after going overboard from the ship while it was docked in Rotterdam. One source stated that she had committed suicide, and she had been scheduled to be repatriated on a charter flight which was subsequently cancelled. She was reportedly distraught and last seen crying aboard the ship.

=== July 2026 ===
On July 13 2026, A Regal Princess crew member went overboard near Cancún during a Caribbean cruise and died despite an extensive multi-agency search effort. The person’s identity and the circumstances of the incident have not been publicly disclosed.
