= Royal Princess (2012) =

Royal-class cruise ship operated by Princess Cruises

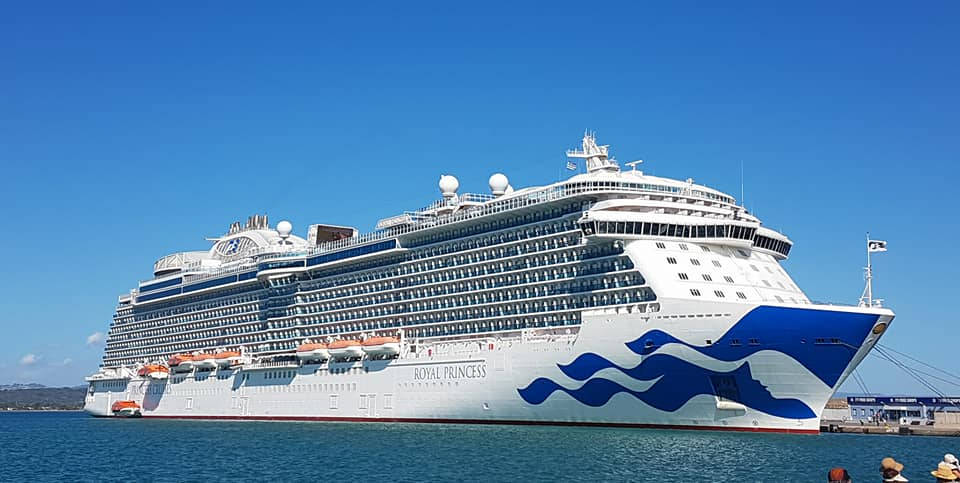

History

Bermuda
- Name: Royal Princess
- Owner: Carnival Corporation & plc
- Operator: Princess Cruises
- Port of registry: Hamilton, Bermuda
- Ordered: 4 May 2010
- Builder: Fincantieri, Monfalcone, Italy
- Cost: $735 million
- Yard number: 6223
- Laid down: 14 December 2010
- Launched: 16 August 2012
- Sponsored by: Catherine, Princess of Wales
- Christened: 13 June 2013
- Acquired: 31 May 2013
- Maiden voyage: 16 June 2013
- In service: 2013–present
- Identification: Call sign: ZCEI3; IMO number: 9584712; MMSI number: 310661000
- Status: In service

General characteristics
- Class & type: Royal-class cruise ship
- Tonnage: 142,714 GT
- Length: 330 m (1,082 ft 8 in)
- Beam: 47 m (155 ft) - With SeaWalk; 38.4 m (126 ft 0 in) - Without SeaWalk
- Height: 66 m (217 ft)
- Draught: 8.5 m (27 ft 11 in)
- Installed power: 2 × Wärtsilä 12V46F Diesel generators producing 14,400 kW (19,300 hp) each; 2 × Wärtsilä 14V46F Diesel generators producing 16,800 kW (22,500 hp) each; Total Installed Power: 62,400 kW (83,700 hp)
- Propulsion: 2 × 18,000 kW (24,000 hp)
- Speed: Service speed: 22 knots (41 km/h; 25 mph); Maximum: 22.9 knots (42.4 km/h; 26.4 mph)
- Capacity: 3,600 passengers

Royal Princess is a Royal-class cruise ship operated by Princess Cruises, a subsidiary of Carnival Corporation & plc, and is the third ship to sail for the cruise line under that name. The largest ship to have been built for Princess at the time of delivery in 2013, she became the flagship of Princess. As the lead vessel of the Royal class, she lends her name to the company's Royal class, which will consist of six ships upon the last ship's delivery in 2021. The ship measures 142,714 GT and has a capacity of 3,560 passengers.

== Design and specifications ==
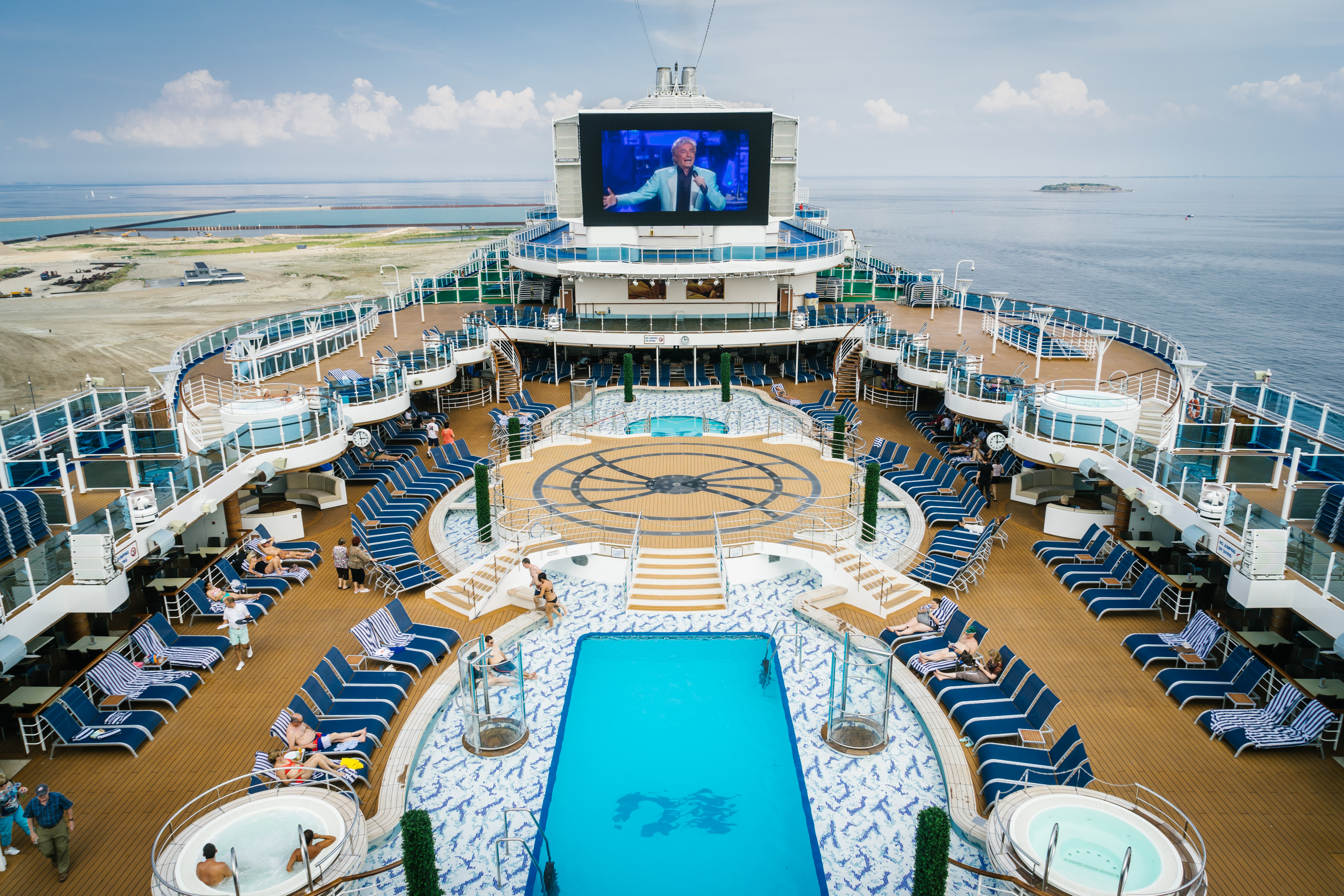
View of the pool deck area ("Lido deck"), including water fountain feature, SeaWalk walkways, and movie screen

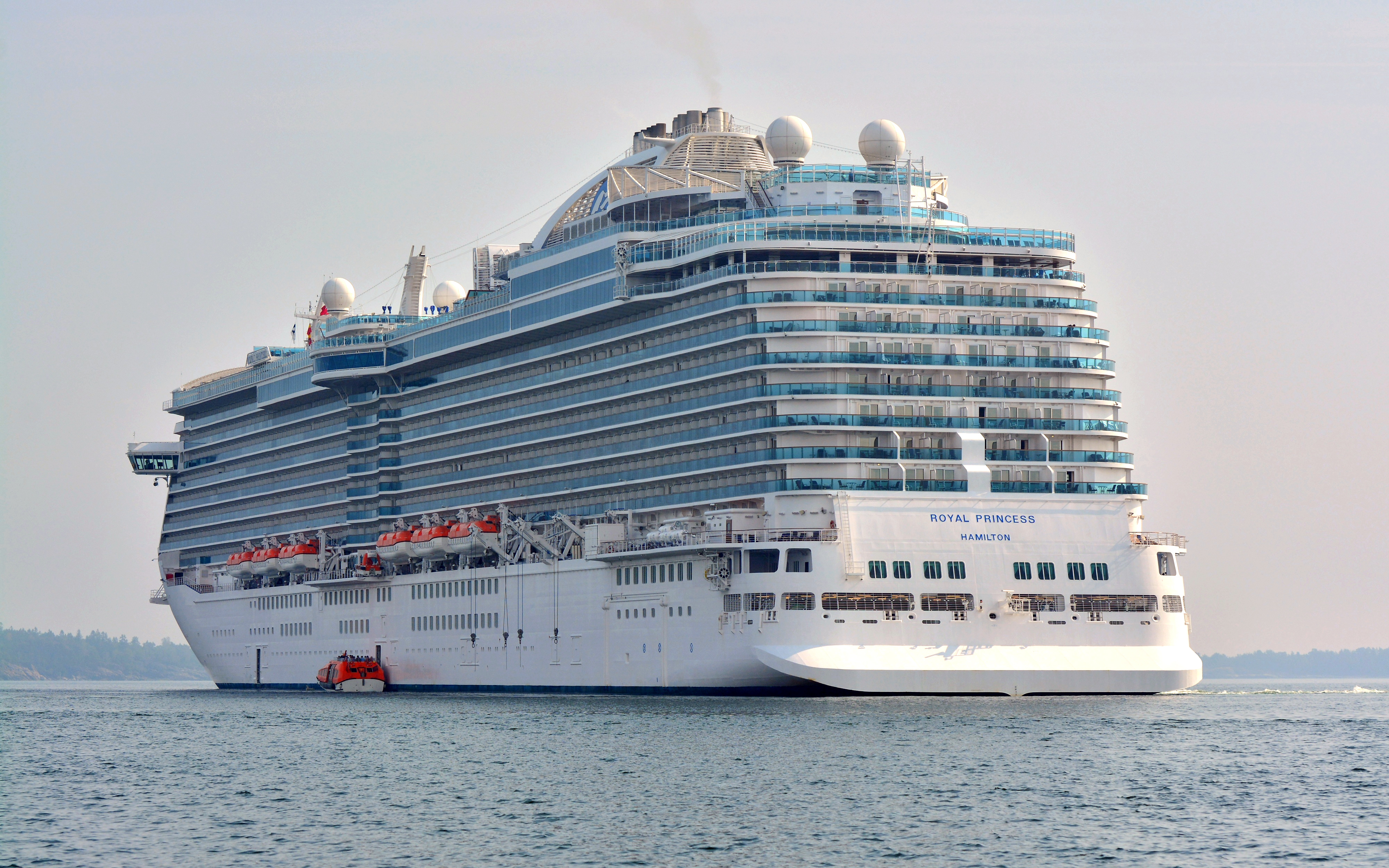
View of the stern

Royal Princess measures 142,714 gross tonnage (GT), has a length of 330.0 metres (1,082 ft 8 in), a draught of 8.5 metres (27 ft 11 in), and a beam of 38.4 metres (126 ft 0 in). She is powered by a diesel-electric genset system, with four Wärtsilä engines, producing a total of 62.4 megawatts (83,700 hp). Main propulsion is via two propellers, each driven by an 18 megawatts (24,000 hp) electric motor. The system gives the vessel a service speed of 22 knots (41 km/h; 25 mph) and a maximum speed of 22.9 knots (42.4 km/h; 26.4 mph). The ship houses 1,780 passenger cabins and 751 crew cabins. Of the 1,780 passenger cabins, 81% have a balcony. The ship has a maximum capacity of 5,600 passengers and crew.

Royal Princess was one of the first passenger ships built to comply with the safe return to port requirements. As the largest ship in the fleet at the time, an increase in overall volume and decrease in space allocated to pools allowed for more venues than on any other Princess ship. Among the offerings onboard are two sets of cantilevered walkways extending over the port and starboard sides of the ship known as the "SeaWalk," three swimming pools, a dancing water fountain, a movie screen designed by Daktronics, a nightclub, and several entertainment lounges.

== Construction and career ==
On 17 February 2010, Carnival Corporation & plc reached an agreement with Italian shipbuilder, Fincantieri, to build two prototype ships for Princess. The ships were designed to measure approximately 139,000 GT with a passenger capacity of 3,600 and had scheduled debuts for spring 2013 and 2014, respectively. These two vessels would become the largest vessels to be built by Fincantieri and also the largest vessels built for Princess to date. The final contract for the two ships was signed on 4 May 2010. The ship is reported to have cost $735 million.

On 15 March 2011, Princess and Fincantieri celebrated the cutting of the steel for the new-build vessel at the shipyard in Monfalcone, Italy. The same day, it was announced she would be named Royal Princess, in honor of the former ships with the name in the cruise line's history. Her keel-laying ceremony was held on 20 October 2011. She floated out of the shipyard on 16 August 2012.

=== Delivery and christening ===
On 30 May 2013, Royal Princess was officially presented to Princess in Monfalcone.

On 9 April 2013, it was announced that the Duchess of Cambridge would name Royal Princess in a naming ceremony in Southampton, United Kingdom on 13 June 2013. The ceremony upheld British ship-naming traditions, including the blessing and a performance by the Royal Marines and the pipers of the Irish Guards. The ship arrived at the Ocean Terminal in Southampton on 7 June and hosted events for customers and travel agents, including a special naming gala on the evening of 12 June. The ship's inaugural celebrations concluded with her maiden voyage on 16 June.

=== Atlantic and Mediterranean service ===
To start her inaugural season, Royal Princess performed two 2-night preview sailings from Southampton to St. Peter Port, Guernsey on 9 June 2013 and 14 June 2013. She left on her 7-day maiden voyage on 16 June 2013 from Southampton to Barcelona, calling in Vigo, Lisbon, Gibraltar, and Málaga. She then cruised 12-day Mediterranean voyages from Barcelona to Venice throughout that summer before re-positioning to her North American homeport of Port Everglades in Fort Lauderdale, Florida in fall 2013.

On 22 September 2013, Royal Princess experienced a power outage while sailing between Mykonos and Naples. A back-up generator provided power for essential services, but the cruise terminated in Naples for emergency repairs and the ship resumed regular sailings from Barcelona on 27 September. The ship was sailing a 12-day Mediterranean cruise from Venice at the time of the incident.

Between 2013 and 2019, Royal Princess continued to sail out of her homeport of Port Everglades to the Caribbean during the winter seasons and re-positioned to Europe, including the Mediterranean, the Baltic, and the British Isles, during the summer seasons, with several short fall seasons cruising the Canadian Maritimes and New England coast.

On 13 November 2018, a 52-year-old woman was reported dead after falling from the upper decks onto a lifeboat. Authorities from the FBI and Aruba investigated the incident, no charges were filed. The ship was sailing an 8-day Southern Caribbean cruise from Port Everglades at the time of the incident and was en route to Aruba at the time of the woman's death.

Royal Princess was refurbished in a wet dock in Freeport, Bahamas in December 2018.

=== Pacific service ===
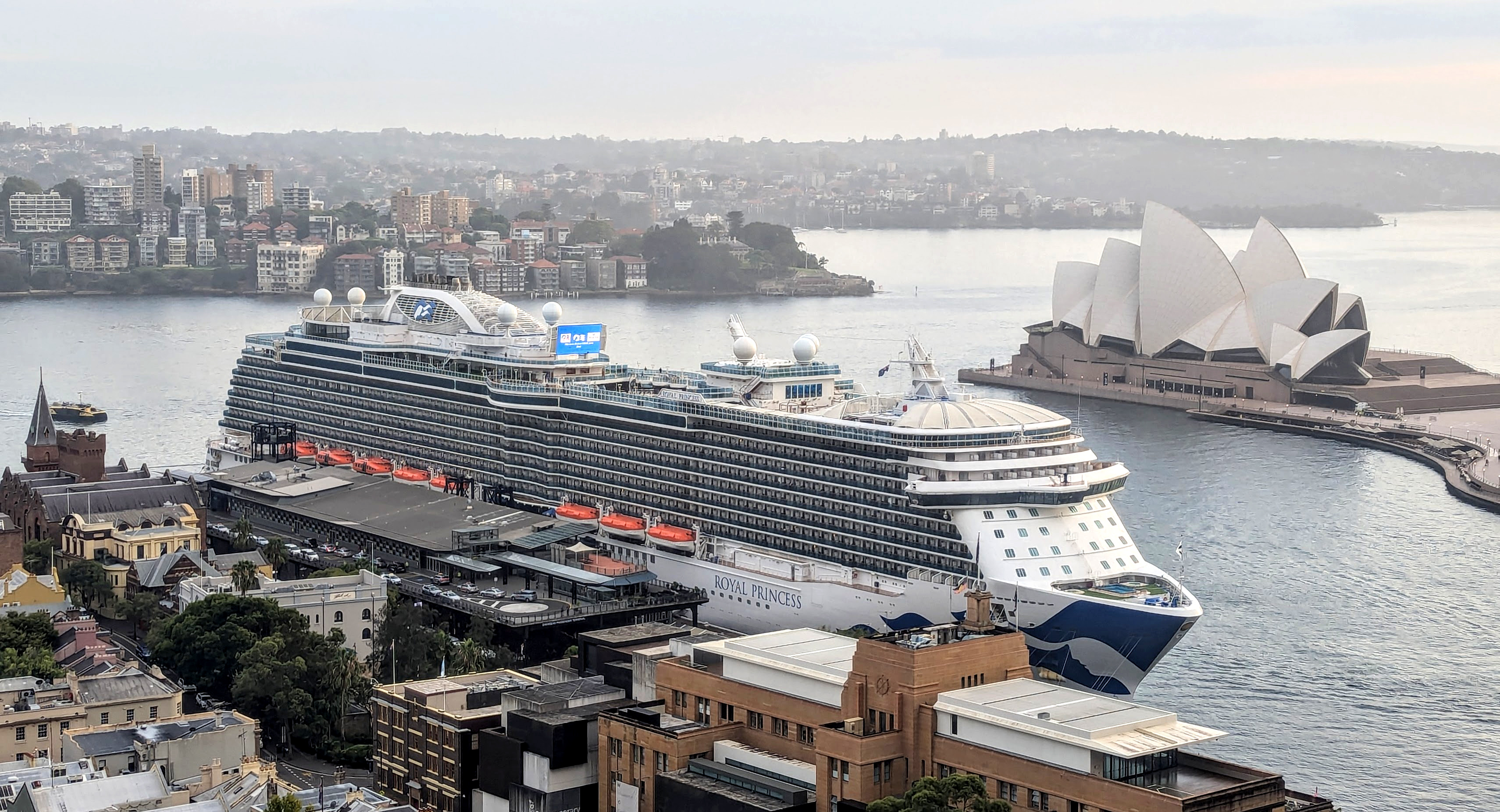
Royal Princess at Sydney's Overseas Passenger Terminal

On 2 February 2019, she re-positioned to Los Angeles, California via a 49-day voyage circumnavigating South America and became the first Royal-class ship to call at a port in the Western United States. Beginning in March 2019, Royal Princess sails to the Mexican Riviera and along the California coast from her homeport of Port of Los Angeles during the fall, winter, and spring seasons, and along the Alaskan coast from her homeports of Vancouver, British Columbia and Whittier, Alaska during the summer seasons.

On 13 May 2019, six people died when two floatplanes, all carrying passengers from Royal Princess, collided in midair near Ketchikan, Alaska. All passengers and the pilot aboard a Mountain Air Service De Havilland DHC-2 Beaver and one passenger aboard a Taquan Air De Havilland DHC-3 Otter were reported dead at the scene. The other nine passengers on the DHC-3 Otter were rescued and received medical attention. The United States Coast Guard assisted in the rescue and the NTSB and Alaska State Troopers were leading the investigation. The ship was sailing a 7-day Alaska cruise from Vancouver to Whittier, Alaska at the time of the incident, and was docked in Ketchikan when the collision occurred.

On 7 March 2020, after a crew member from Grand Princess had transferred to Royal Princess fifteen days earlier, the United States Centers for Disease Control and Prevention issued a "no-sail order" for the ship on 8 March 2020, prompting Princess to cancel the ship's seven-day cruise to Mexico before it departed Los Angeles.

After completing the Alaska circuit in 2022, Royal Princess served the West Coast market from San Francisco in 2022/2023, and the Australia and South Pacific circuit in 2023/2024.
