= Mexican Riviera =

Cities on Mexico's west coast

Major ports of the "Mexican Riviera".

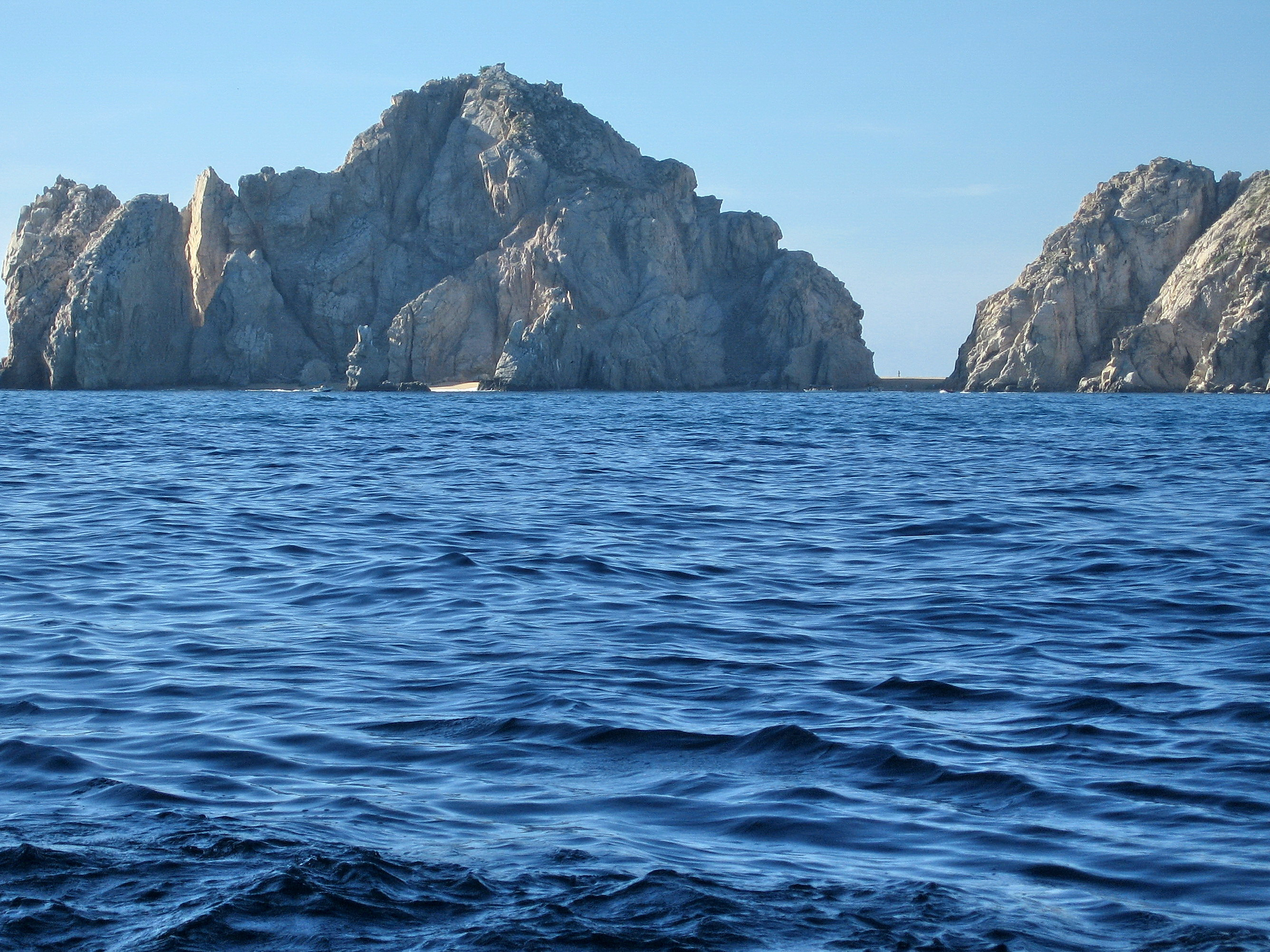
Cabo San Lucas

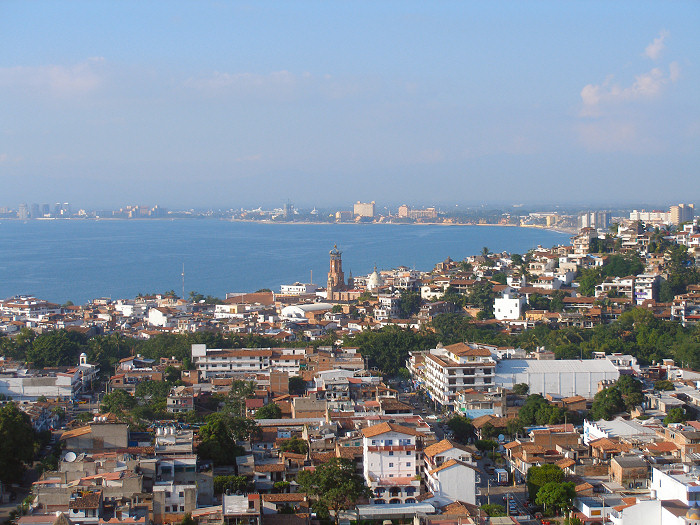
Puerto Vallarta

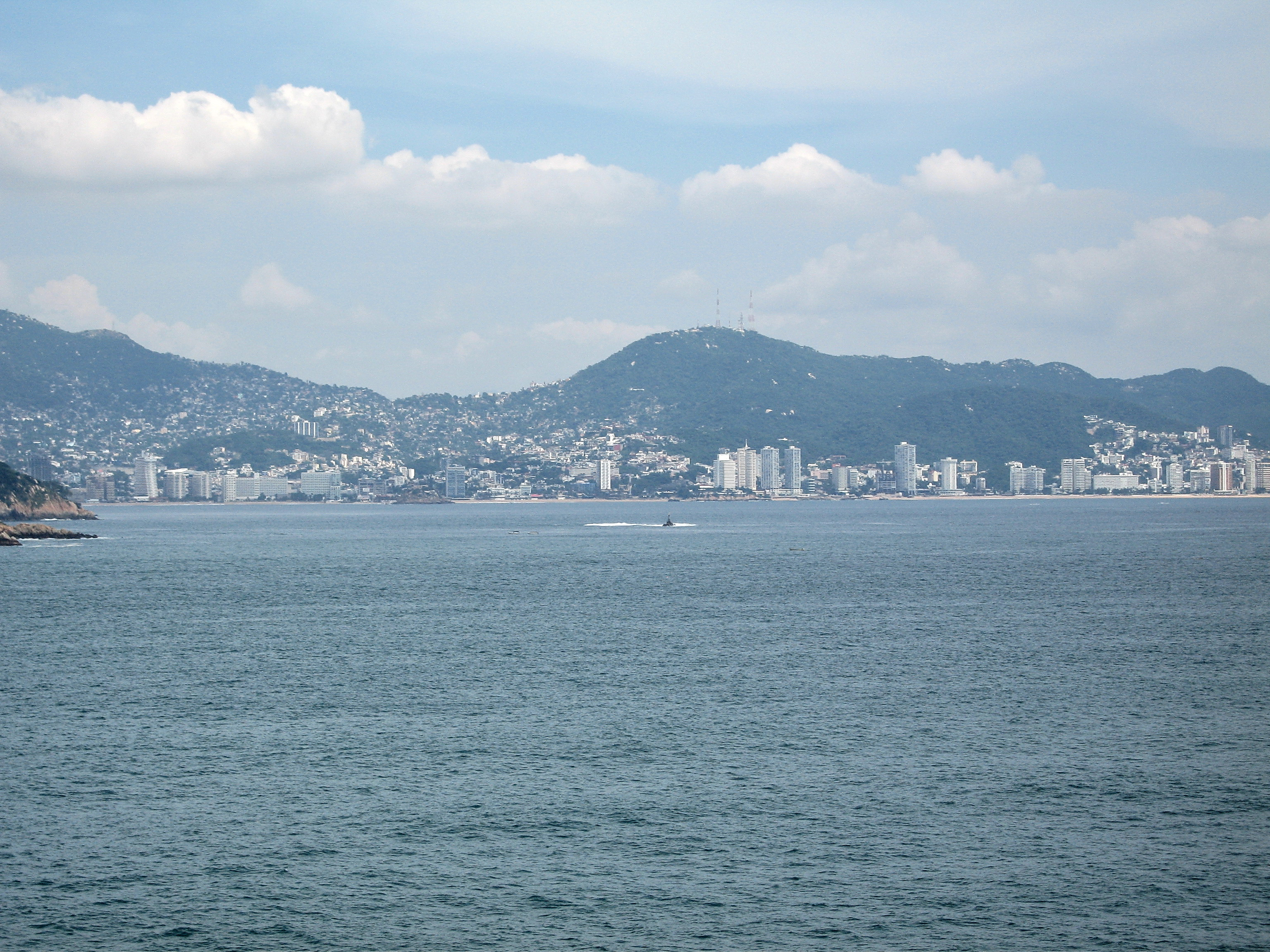
Acapulco

The Mexican Riviera refers collectively to twenty cities and lagoons lying on the western coast of Mexico. Although there are long distances between these cities, they are often collectively referred to as the Mexican Riviera because of their many oceanfront resorts and their popularity among tourists. Cruise ships often visit three or four of these destinations on their longer cruises.

== List of places ==
Some of the many areas that are considered part of the Mexican Riviera, listed in order from north to south:

- Ensenada, Baja California
- Cabo San Lucas, Baja California Sur
- Mazatlán, Sinaloa
- San Blas, Nayarit
- Puerto Vallarta, Jalisco
- Manzanillo, Colima
- The Ixtapa resort near Zihuatanejo, Guerrero
- Acapulco, Guerrero
- Puerto Escondido, Oaxaca
- Huatulco
- Salina Cruz, Oaxaca

Ports in the states of Oaxaca and Nayarit are also included.

In 2011, Carnival Cruise Lines, Disney Cruise Line and Norwegian Cruise Line all dropped Mazatlan port calls from their itineraries, citing concerns over an increase in drug gang turf war there. Royal Caribbean dramatically scaled back its presence in all of the Mexican Riviera that same year, canceling 15 cruises that were scheduled to sail through the region in 2011. The cruise line cited economic reasons for its decision.

== See also ==
- Riviera (disambiguation)
- Riviera Maya
- Riviera Nayarit
