= Sapphire Princess =

Cruise ship operated by Princess Cruises

- Sapphire Princess anchored offshore in Halifax, Nova Scotia, on September 19, 2026

History

United Kingdom
- Name: Sapphire Princess
- Owner: Carnival Corporation & plc
- Operator: Princess Cruises
- Port of registry: 2004–2014: Hamilton, Bermuda; 2014–2025: London, United Kingdom; 2025–2026: Hamilton, Bermuda
- Builder: Mitsubishi Heavy Industries
- Cost: US$ 400 million
- Launched: 25 May 2002
- Christened: 10 June 2004 in Seattle
- Completed: 27 May 2004
- Identification: Call sign: ZCHI4; IMO number: 9228186; MMSI: 310867000
- Status: In service

General characteristics
- Type: Gem-class Cruise ship
- Tonnage: 115,875 GT
- Length: 290 m (951 ft 5 in)
- Beam: 37 m (121 ft 5 in)
- Decks: 13
- Speed: 22 knots (41 km/h; 25 mph)
- Capacity: 2,670 passengers
- Crew: 1,100

Sapphire Princess is a cruise ship owned by Princess Cruises that entered service in 2004 as the sister ship of Diamond Princess. At the time she was one of the world's largest cruise ships, with a capacity of 2,670 passengers and is the second Gem-class ship built by Princess Cruises. Sapphire Princess was christened on 10 June 2004, in Seattle—the first cruise ship ever to be christened in that port.

== Design and construction ==
Sapphire Princess was built in Japan by Mitsubishi Heavy Industries, the second Princess Cruises ship to be built in a Japanese shipyard. Her only sister ship is Diamond Princess, with whom she swapped names during construction. She and her sister ship were the largest cruise ships to be built by Mitsubishi since the Crystal Harmony in 1991.

The name swap occurred because a major fire swept through the original Diamond Princess (presently sailing as today's Sapphire Princess) during construction, leading to a construction delay. Both sister ships were being constructed at the same time, so the original Sapphire assumed the role of Diamond. This name swap assisted in keeping the delivery date of Diamond Princess on time, and kept Sapphire Princess on schedule as it was nearing completion early. Due to the fire and name swap, she would be the last Carnival Corporation & plc vessel built by Mitsubishi until the completion of AIDAprima in 2016.

Despite being technically similar to her Grand-class sister ships, she lacks the "wing" across the rear and above the stern that housed the Skywalkers Nightclub, which can be seen on Golden Princess, Star Princess, and Caribbean Princess.

== Machinery ==
Her diesel-electric plant includes four diesel generators and a gas turbine generator. The diesel generators are Wärtsilä 46 series common rail engines, two of the straight 9-cylinder configuration, and two of the straight 8-cylinder configuration. The 8- and 9-cylinder engines can produce approximately 8 1/2 and 9 1/2 MW of power respectively. These engines are fueled with heavy fuel oil (HFO or bunker c) and Marine Gas Oil (MGO) depending on the local regulations regarding emissions, as MGO produces much lower emissions but is much more expensive. The gas turbine generator is a GE 2500, producing a peak of 25 MW of power and being fueled by MGO. This generator is much more expensive to run than the diesel generators, and is used mostly in areas, such as Alaska, where the emissions regulations are strict. It is also used when top speed is required to make it to a port in a short time period. There are two propulsion electric motors which drive fixed-pitch propellers and six thrusters used during maneuvering; three bow and three stern. The propulsion electric motors (PEMs), are conventional synchronous motors made by Alstom Motors, driven by synchroconverters made by Alstom Power Conversion (now GE Power Conversion). The two motors are each rated to 20 MW and have a maximum speed of 154 rpm. (Rated speed of 0-145 rpm.)

== Areas of operation ==
Sapphire Princess commenced service on the West Coast of the United States in the summer of 2004. She sailed to the Australia and New Zealand during her inaugural 2004-05 winter season.

She was deployed to Asia in 2014, offering Summer cruises from Shanghai, along with winter cruises out of Singapore. After her Singapore season concluded in 2016, the ship sailed from China year-round until 2017. The winter sailings from Singapore resumed during the 2017–18 season.

On 28 March 2018 she re-positioned to Southampton, UK with a 38-day cruise where she was based until 21 October 2018 when she returned to Singapore with another 38 day cruise. Sapphire Princess will again in 2019 re-position to Southampton for the northern summer before returning to Singapore later in 2019.

After eight years in Asia and the Pacific, Sapphire Princess resumed operations on the West Coast of the United States in September 2022, following the COVID-19 pandemic. During the Northern Hemisphere winter season, she has sailed itineraries to South America. She will offer cruises to Scandinavia and the Baltics during the Summer 2026 season, departing from Copenhagen.

For the 2026-27 winter season, she will sail to Asia, where she and her sister ship, the Diamond Princess, "will offer a series of ten- to 42-night itineraries to destinations in the Far East and Southeast Asia including Japan, Singapore, Malaysia and South Korea." Princess Cruises has announced a return to Western Australia, with Sapphire Princess scheduled to operate nine cruises from Fremantle during the Southern Hemisphere's 2027–28 summer season.

== Incidents and accidents ==
=== Whale strikes ===
On two occasions, whales have been found dead on the bulbous bow of Sapphire Princess, a year apart from each other. On 25 July 2009, the ship docked at Canada Place Terminal, in Vancouver, British Columbia, Canada, with a dead fin whale lodged on its bow. The estimated 21.3 metres (70 ft) whale was found on top of the bulbous bow. A preliminary necropsy from Fisheries and Oceans Canada suggested the whale might have been sick.

On 28 July 2010, Sapphire Princess had a whale stuck on the bow of the ship. The estimated 12.2 m (40 ft) humpback whale became entangled on the ship's bulbous bow while Sapphire Princess was sailing from Ketchikan to Juneau.

Prior to the first incident with Sapphire Princess, the last time that an Alaskan cruise ship docked in Vancouver with a whale on its bow was in 1999, when a dead 20-metre (66 ft) fin whale was found on Galaxy.

=== 2020 COVID-19 Pandemic ===
In 2020, the Sapphire Princess was anchored in the Manila Bay Anchorage after returning hundreds of cruise ship employees to the Philippines after the COVID-19 pandemic resulted in the shutdown of the cruise vacation industry.

=== “Wilderness Discoverer” expedition Ship rescue operation in Glacier Bay ===
On June 5, 2023, while en route to Glacier Bay, the Sapphire Princess received a signal of distress coming from a nearby Wilderness Discoverer. The latter had experienced a fire in the engine room and was drifting. The rescue operation took place with the help of the Coast Guard and led 51 of the passengers and 16 crew members to safety.
