= Emerald Princess =

Cruise ship

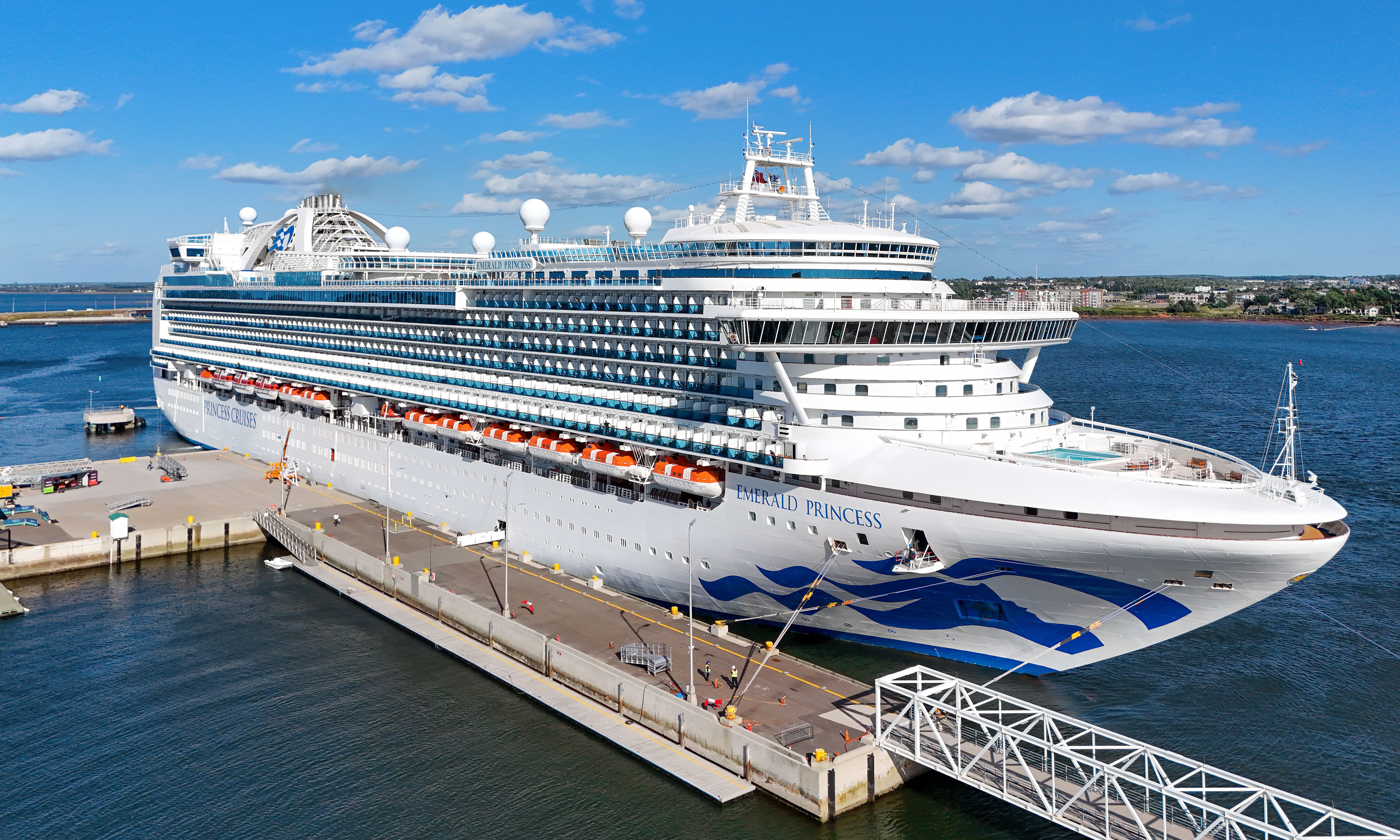
- Emerald Princess in Charlottetown, 2024

History

Bermuda
- Name: Emerald Princess
- Owner: Carnival Corporation & plc
- Operator: Princess Cruises
- Port of registry: Hamilton, Bermuda
- Ordered: 23 September 2004
- Builder: Fincantieri, Italy
- Cost: US$500 million
- Laid down: 14 September 2005
- Launched: 1 June 2006
- Christened: 13 May 2007 by Florence Henderson, Marion Ross, Erin Moran and Susan Olsen
- Acquired: 24 March 2007
- Maiden voyage: 11 April 2007
- Identification: Call sign: ZCDP8; IMO number: 9333151; MMSI number: 310531000
- Status: In service

General characteristics
- Class & type: Crown-class cruise ship
- Tonnage: 113,561 GT; 8,400 DWT
- Length: 951 ft (290 m)
- Beam: 118 ft (36 m)
- Draught: 26.2 ft (8.0 m)
- Decks: 15 passenger decks
- Installed power: 6 × Diesel generators, 67 MW
- Propulsion: 2 × PEM, fixed pitch propellers, 21 MW each
- Speed: 21.5 knots (39.8 km/h; 24.7 mph)
- Capacity: 3,114 passengers (Lower Beds)
- Crew: 1,200

Emerald Princess is a Crown-class cruise ship for Princess Cruises that entered service in April 2007. Her sister ships include Ruby Princess and Crown Princess.

Emerald Princess launched from the Italian shipyard of Fincantieri Monfalcone on 1 June 2006. She was then handed over to Princess Cruises on 24 March 2007. Emerald Princess was christened on 13 May 2007, in Greece.

== Service history ==
Emerald Princess began commercial service on 11 April 2007, offering 12-day Mediterranean and Greek Isles cruises, and continued sailing Europe for Summer 2007. She was then re-positioned in Fort Lauderdale in the fall to offer Caribbean cruises.

== Refurbishment schedule ==
The vessel entered dry-dock on 30 November 2015, for 13 days of minor refurbishments. The ship left dry-dock on 13 December. Previously Emerald Princess underwent dry-dock renovations from 7 December through 17 December 2012.

== Areas of operation ==
Emerald Princess is usually based in Europe in the summer and in the United States in the winter. Past itineraries have included 11-day cruises to Scandinavia & Russia from Copenhagen and Warnemuende near Rostock, 10-day cruises to Canada/New England from New York, and 10-day cruises to the Caribbean from Fort Lauderdale. In 2014 she was based in Southampton for cruises to the Baltic, Mediterranean, and the fjords of Norway, as well as to the Canary Islands. She then re-positioned to Houston for seven-day cruises to the western Caribbean in the winter 2014–2015 season.

=== Coronavirus quarantine ===
Reports in May 2020 indicated that there had been no confirmed COVID-19 cases on this vessel which was docked in Florida as of 9 May 2020. Some days earlier, it had been denied permission to dock at Nassau, but by that time, contained only crew members. Passengers had been allowed to disembark previously. On 9 May, the 123 Canadian and American crew members were allowed to disembark at Port Everglades, although others remained on board.

== Incidents ==
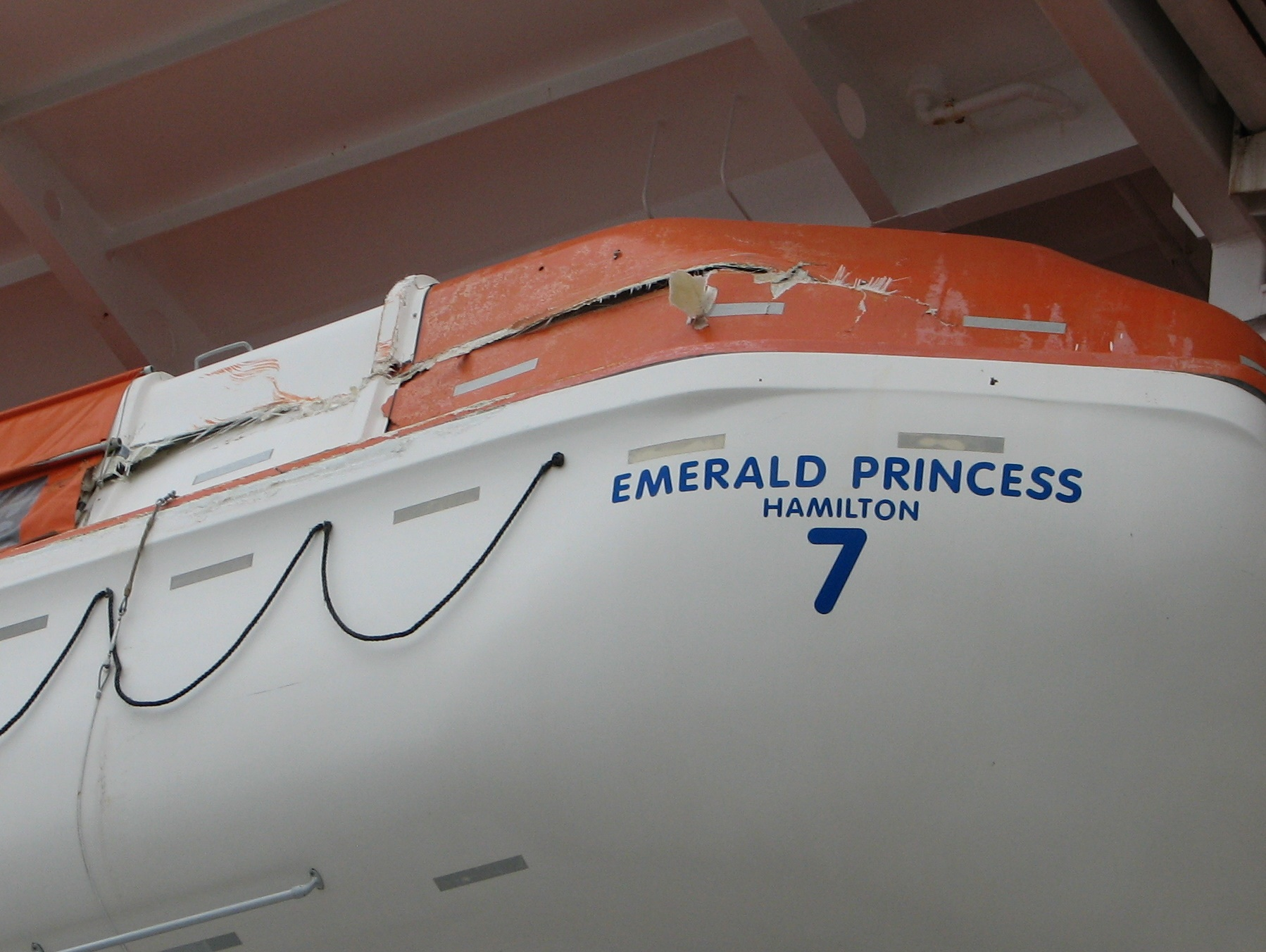
Damage to a lifeboat after the refueling incident

On 17 May 2011, the ship sustained considerable damage to several lifeboats when a fuel loading barge collided with the side of the ship while in the port of St. Petersburg, Russia. After inspection by authorities, it was determined that the ship still had enough passenger space in an emergency using inflatable life rafts, and the ship continued on her planned itinerary.

On 25 July 2017 Kristy Manzanares, 43, was murdered by her husband Kenneth in their cabin during a cruise. He later admitted second-degree murder following an FBI investigation, receiving a 30-year sentence in 2021. He later died in prison that same year.
