= Crown Princess (ship) =

Crown Princess may refer to one of the following ships in service with Princess Cruises:

- Crown Princess (1989), 1990-built cruise ship in service with Princess Cruises until 2002
- Crown Princess (2005), 2006-built cruise ship in service with Princess Cruises since 2006
