= Crown Princess (2005) =

Cruise ship

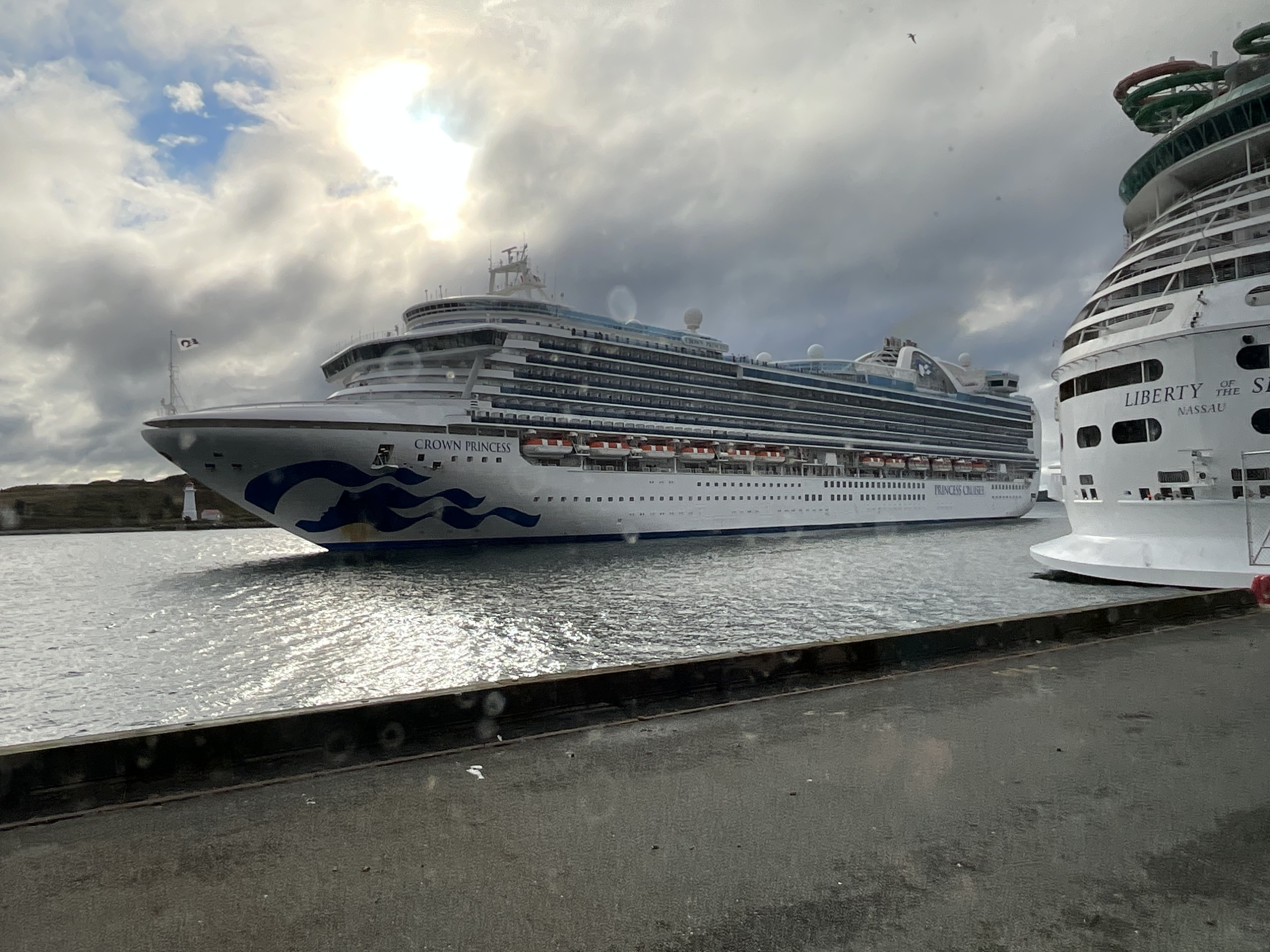
- Crown Princess arriving in the Port of Halifax, Nova Scotia, Canada, for the first time on 18 August 2025 as she passes by Liberty of the Seas

History
- Name: Crown Princess
- Owner: Carnival Corporation
- Operator: Princess Cruises
- Port of registry: Hamilton, Bermuda
- Builder: Fincantieri
- Laid down: 3 May 2004
- Launched: 9 September 2005
- Completed: 26 May 2006
- Maiden voyage: 14 June 2006
- In service: 2006-present
- Home port: Port Everglades, Florida (Currently); Southampton, United Kingdom (Formerly)
- Identification: IMO number: 9293399; Call sign ZCDM6; Official Number: 733730
- Status: In service

General characteristics
- Class & type: Crown-class cruise ship
- Tonnage: 113,561 GT
- Length: 952 ft (290 m)
- Beam: waterline: 118 ft (36 m)
- Height: 195 ft (59 m)
- Draught: 27.32 ft (8.33 m)
- Depth: 37.4 ft (11.4 m)
- Decks: 18
- Installed power: Wärtsilä-Sulzer 16ZAV40S and 12ZAV40S diesel engines
- Propulsion: Two 6-blade fixed pitch propellers and 6 thrusters, 3 at bow and 3 at stern (19 MW each)
- Speed: 21.5 knots (39.8 km/h; 24.7 mph) max.
- Capacity: 3,080
- Crew: 1,200

Crown Princess is a Crown-class cruise ship owned and operated by Princess Cruises, with a capacity of 3,080 guests and a crew complement of 1,200. Her maiden voyage took place on 14 June 2006, departing Red Hook, Brooklyn (New York) for Grand Turk (Turks and Caicos Islands), Ocho Rios (Jamaica), Grand Cayman (Cayman Islands), and Port Canaveral (Florida).

Crown Princess operates in the Caribbean Sea during the Winter season, and in Europe for the Summer season. Like her sister ships Emerald Princess and Ruby Princess, her Skywalkers Night Club is built aft of the funnel rather than suspended over the stern as a "wing," or "spoiler", as seen on Caribbean Princess. Her godmother is Martha Stewart.

== Cruising history ==
Until November 2012, Crown Princess was operating in the Mediterranean Sea. In November 2012 the ship sailed to Galveston, Texas, for the first time, where she provided western Caribbean cruises. In April 2013 she departed for Southampton and operated cruises to Northern Europe, the Mediterranean, and the Canary Islands. Subsequently, Crown Princess returned to the United States to Fort Lauderdale, offering Caribbean cruises until February 2014.

On 18 January 2013, it was announced that Crown Princess would navigate around South America. The Caribbean cruises from 15 February 2014 through 26 April 2014 were cancelled to allow for the South America cruise. After the South America cruise, she visited Mexico, Hawaii, and offered Pacific coastal cruises from Los Angeles, as well as Northbound and Southbound cruises from Vancouver and Whittier or round-trip Alaskan cruises from Seattle.

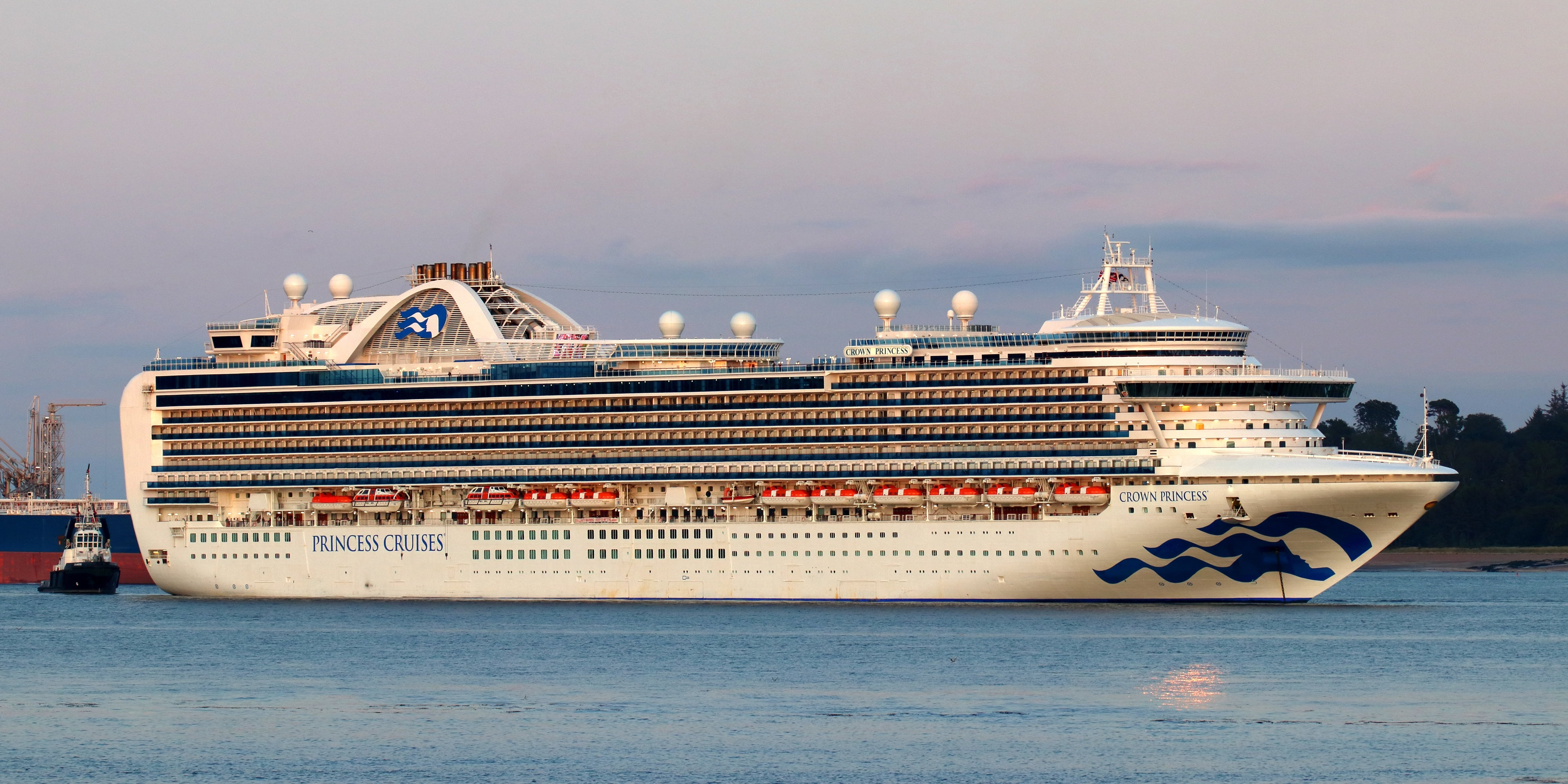
Crown Princess at Edinburgh, Scotland on 2 August 2019

Starting in the 2016–2017 season she undertook a full season to South America. At the end of the season, she returned to Fort Lauderdale to offer Caribbean cruises. In April 2018, the ship underwent an extensive 10-day renovation at Freeport, Bahamas.

In August 2019, Crown Princess returned to the British Isles, then re-positioned to Fort Lauderdale for the 2019–2020 winter season, operating on Southern Caribbean itineraries.

As of 2024, the ship was scheduled for summer cruises to Alaska on the west coast of North America. Crown Princess took a 113-day world cruise starting in June 2025 from Sydney, Australia.

== Incidents ==
=== Listing incident ===
On 18 July 2006, at approximately 3:30 p.m. ET, one hour after departing her last port of call in Port Canaveral, Crown Princess reported "listing" or making "heavy turns". The United States Coast Guard was contacted shortly after and crews arrived within minutes to assist the troubled vessel. The cruise ship was on its way back to New York City, and the decision was made to return to Port Canaveral due to what was initially thought to be a malfunction in the steering equipment, which caused a severe tilting of the ship, and injuries.

However, the United States' National Transportation Safety Board (NTSB) found that the second officer, the senior watch officer on the bridge, had disengaged the automatic steering mode of the vessel's integrated navigation system after it put the ship into what the officer felt was an unusually hard turn to port and took manual control of the steering. The second officer turned the wheel first to port and then from port to starboard several times, eventually causing the vessel to list even more, to a maximum angle of about 24° to starboard. The severe listing tumbled passengers, crew members, pool water, and everything else not secured about the decks.

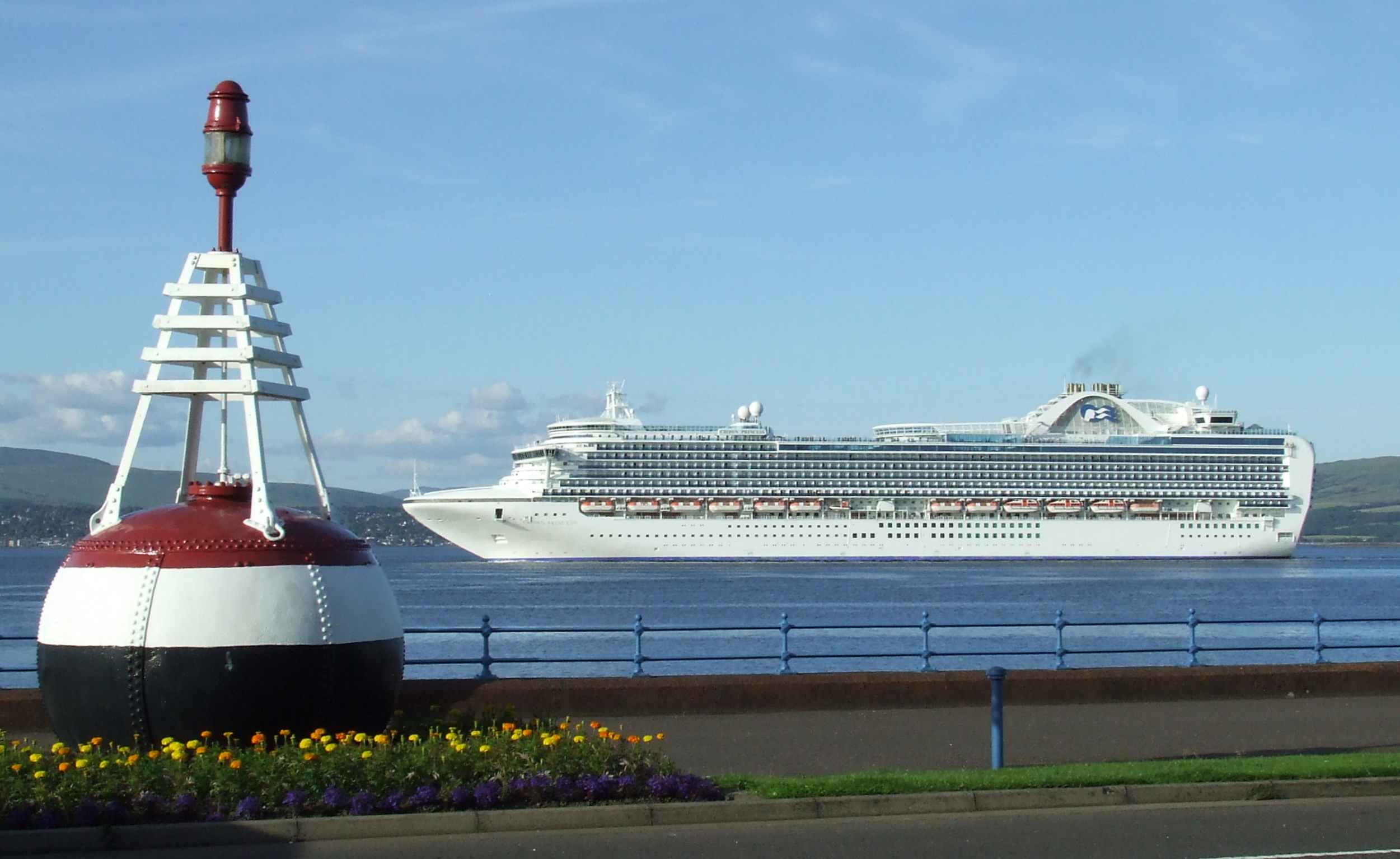
Crown Princess departing Greenock, Scotland on 23 July 2010

Fourteen passengers and crew members were seriously injured, one suffering breathing difficulties after being hit in the chest by an airborne chair, and another 284 had minor injuries. Water from the four on-board pools poured into staircases and lift shafts. Most injuries were on the outdoor areas of Decks 15 and 16, where large beach chairs and tables hit and injured passengers. The other area that had many injured passengers was the balcony areas in the grand atrium. Many there were hit by falling objects and heavy marble tables.

The matter was referred to the NTSB and United States Coast Guard for investigation. After an internal review by Princess Cruises, its president Alan Buckelew publicly stated that "the incident was due to human error and the appropriate personnel changes have been made."

With approval from the Coast Guard and the Bermuda flag authorities, the vessel returned to service. A full refund was given to all passengers on the ill-fated cruise, and a 50% refund to passengers on the following cruise which was set to depart 20 July, but instead departed from Brooklyn on 22 July. Since then, Crown Princess has resumed her normal schedule.

=== Galveston ===
In December 2012, Crown Princess made a transatlantic crossing from Venice to Galveston, Texas, where she stayed to run Caribbean itineraries from December 2012 to April 2013. When the ship arrived in Galveston on 22 December 2012, at least 102 passengers had contracted norovirus. Crown Princess had previously been plagued by two separate outbreaks of norovirus in January and February 2012.

=== Coronavirus pandemic ===
During the pandemic, the Centers for Disease Control and Prevention (CDC) reported, as early as 22 April 2020, that at least one person who tested positive for SARS-CoV-2 had tested positive within 14 days after disembarking.

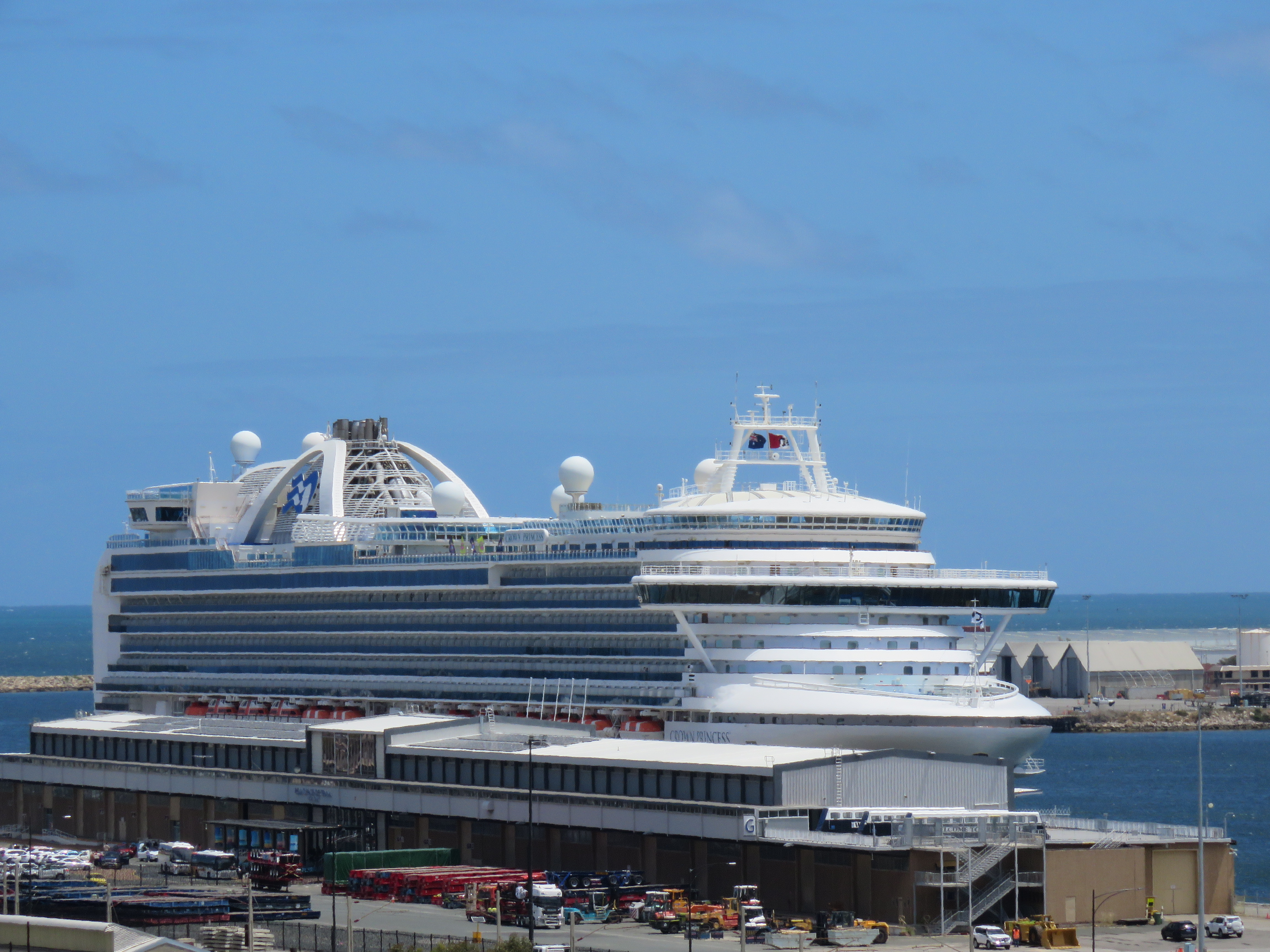
Crown Princess at Fremantle, Perth, Western Australia on 6 November 2024

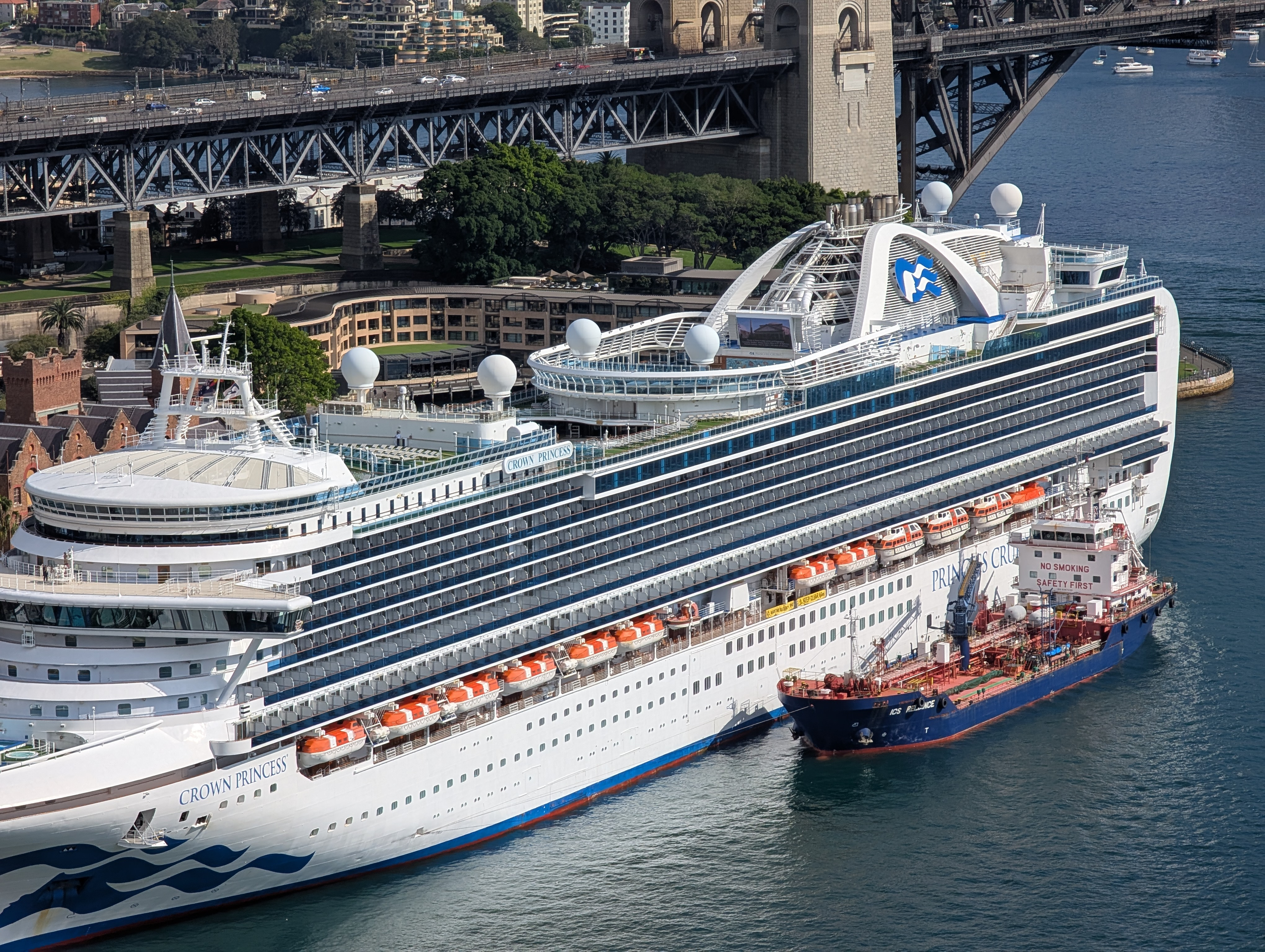
Crown Princess being refueled by ICS Reliance in Sydney's Overseas Passenger Terminal on 8 February 2025
