= Grand Princess =

Cruise ship owned by Princess Cruises

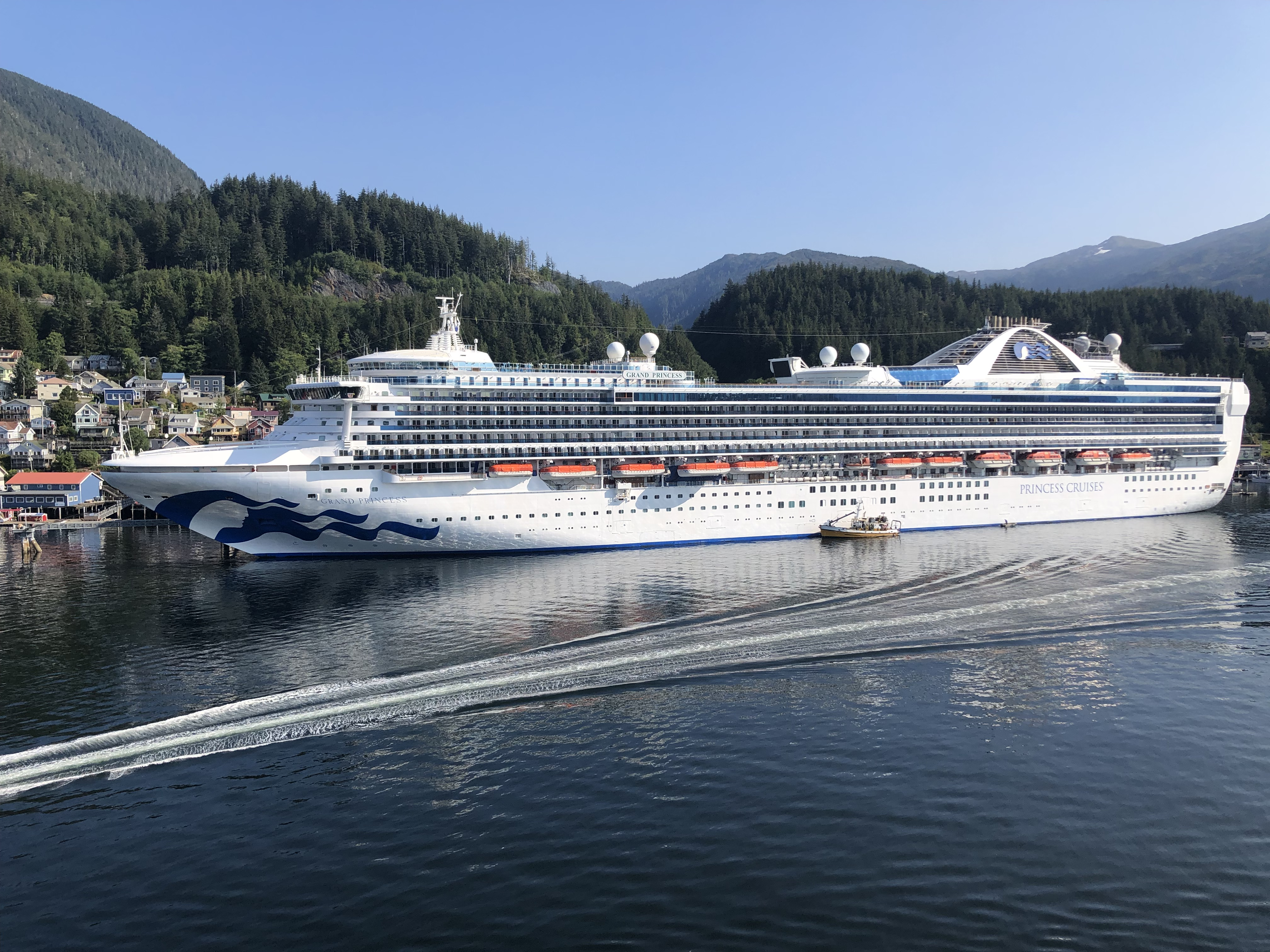
- Grand Princess docked at Ketchikan, Alaska in August 2023

History

Bermuda
- Name: Grand Princess
- Owner: P&O Princess Cruises (1998–2003); Carnival Corporation (2003–present)
- Operator: Princess Cruises
- Port of registry: Monrovia, Liberia (1998–2000); Hamilton, Bermuda (2000–present)
- Ordered: 8 February 1994
- Builder: Fincantieri; Monfalcone, Italy
- Cost: US$450 million
- Yard number: 5956
- Launched: 20 May 1998
- Sponsored by: Olivia de Havilland
- Christened: 29 September 1998
- Maiden voyage: 26 May 1998
- In service: 1998–present
- Identification: Call sign: ZCBU5; IMO number: 9104005; MMSI number: 310327000
- Status: In service

General characteristics
- Type: Grand-class cruise ship
- Tonnage: 107,517 GT
- Length: 289.86 m (951 ft 0 in)
- Beam: 35.97 m (118 ft 0 in)
- Height: 61.26 m (201 ft 0 in)
- Draught: 7.92 m (26 ft 0 in)
- Decks: 17
- Propulsion: Two shafts; fixed-pitch propellers
- Speed: 22.5 knots (41.7 km/h; 25.9 mph) (cruising)
- Boats & landing craft carried: 6 tenders
- Capacity: 2,590 lower berth passengers; 3,100 maximum passengers
- Crew: 1,100

Grand Princess is a Grand-class cruise ship owned by Princess Cruises. It was built in 1998 by Fincantieri Cantieri Navali Italiani in Monfalcone, Italy, with yard number 5956, at a cost of approximately US$450 million. She was the largest and most expensive passenger ship ever built at the time.

== History ==
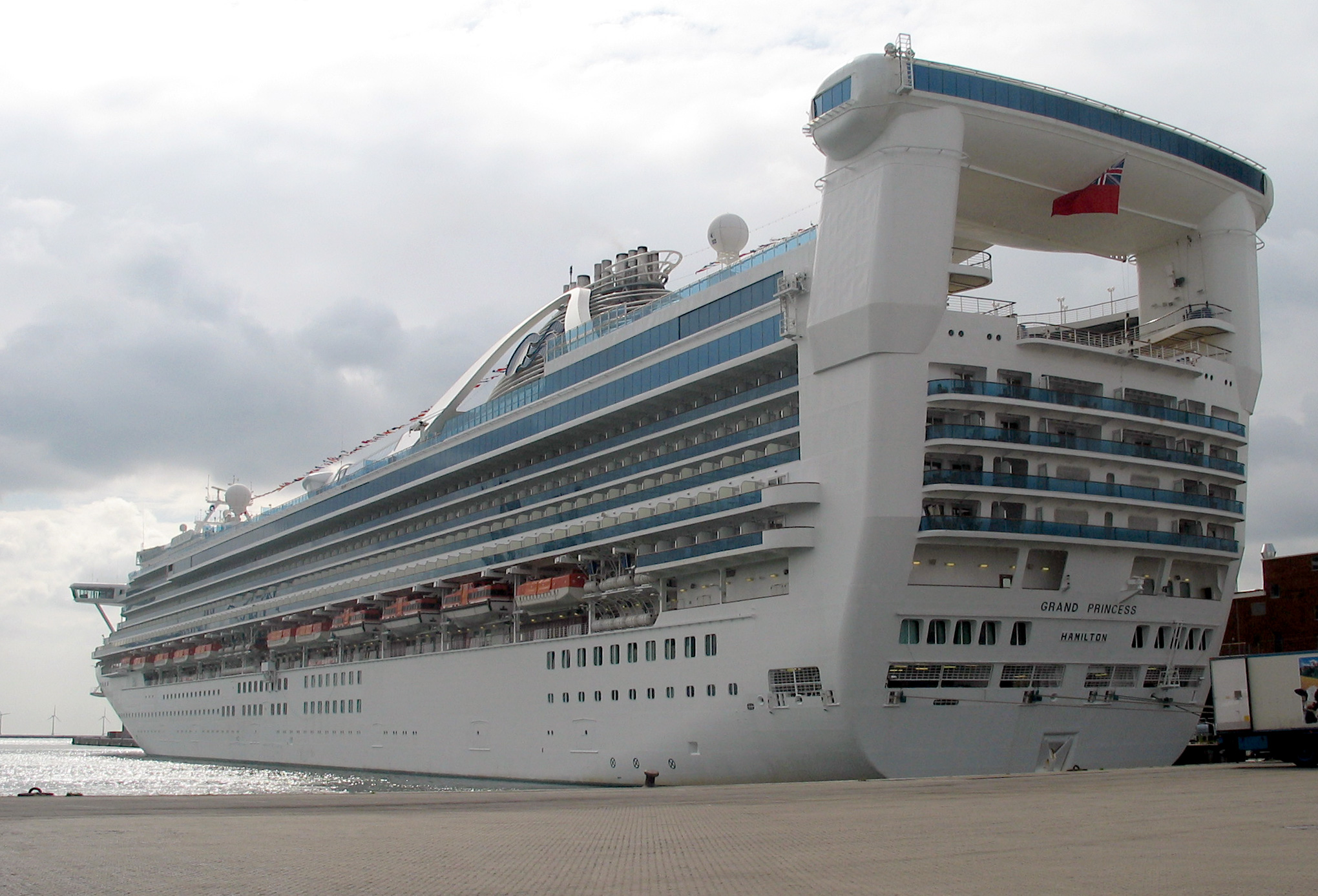
Grand Princess docked in Copenhagen, Denmark on 29 January 2009

Grand Princess was the first of the Grand-class cruise ships debuting in 1998, and christened by Olivia de Havilland. When Grand Princess was launched, she featured in the Princess Cruises brochures as a Sun-class ship; it was only with the subsequent launch of Golden Princess that the Grand class appeared in brochures. The ship has a different decor scheme to her sister ships, using darker woods, and the interior decor is more similar to the smaller Sun-class ships.

She is the sister ship of Star Princess and Golden Princess. Grand Princess was the setting for a task in the second series of the British version of the reality television show The Apprentice.

On 19 July 2009, the ship was drydocked for 14 days for refurbishments such as boosting Grand Princess's energy and environmental efficiency.

=== 2011 refit ===
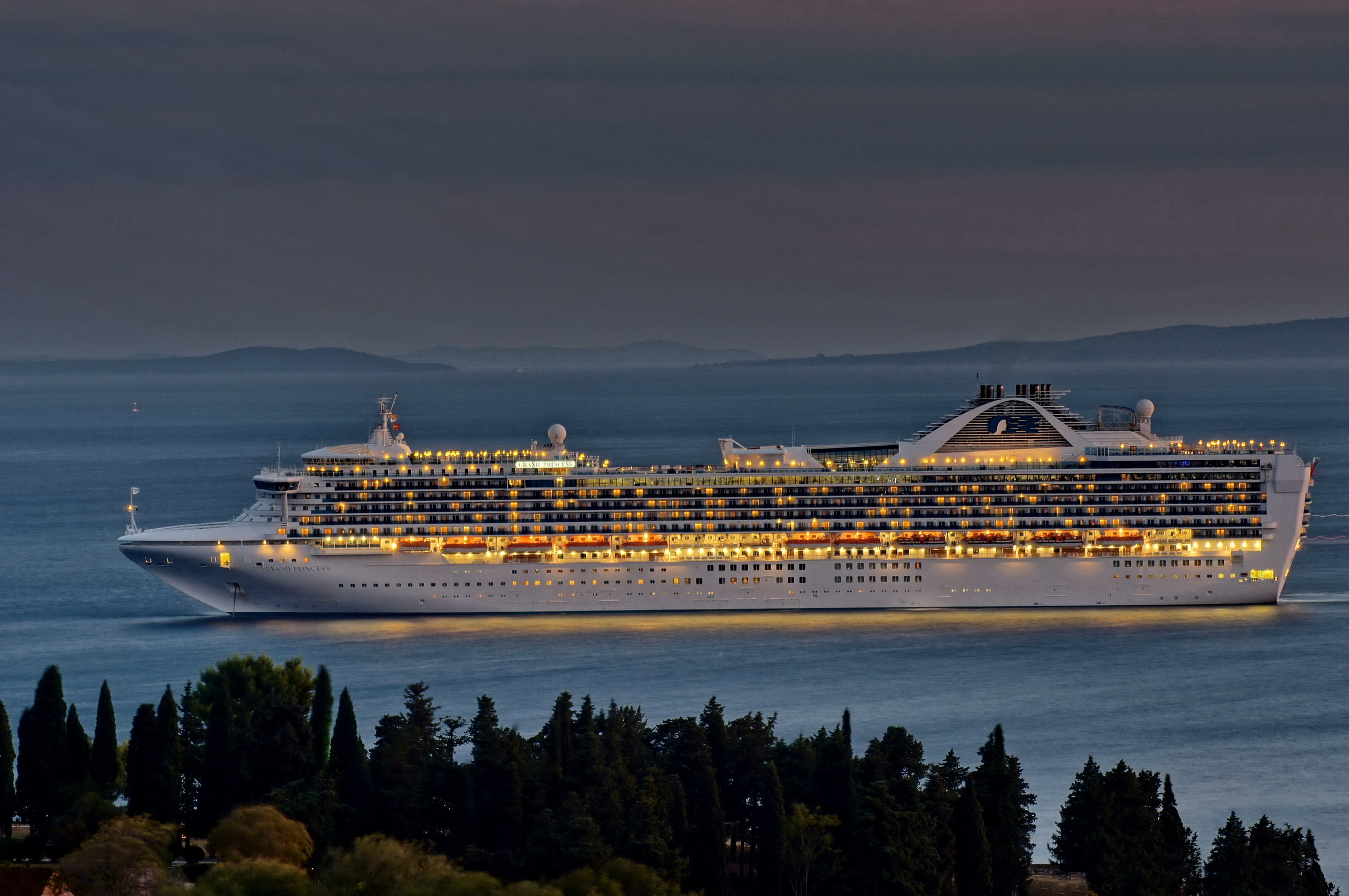
Grand Princess at Split, Croatia in October 2011

In May 2011, Grand Princess completed the most extensive dry-dock in Princess Cruises history that included a refit and removal of the nightclub from her stern. This resolved her tendency to sail bow high, and has improved her fuel economy by about 3–4%. The bow high tendency was specific to Grand Princess and did not affect her sister ships as they were designed with aluminum upper decks. The aft nightclub atop the aft of Grand Princess was removed in the 2011 refit.

== Incidents ==
=== 2017 whale incident ===
On 9 August 2017, a dead humpback whale was found stuck on the bow of the ship after it docked at Ketchikan, Alaska. Princess Cruises issued a statement that said "It is unknown how or when this happened as the ship felt no impact. It is also unknown, at this time, whether the whale was alive or already deceased before becoming lodged on the bow." It was the second time in two years that a whale had been carried into an Alaskan port on the bow of a cruise ship.

=== 2020 coronavirus pandemic ===
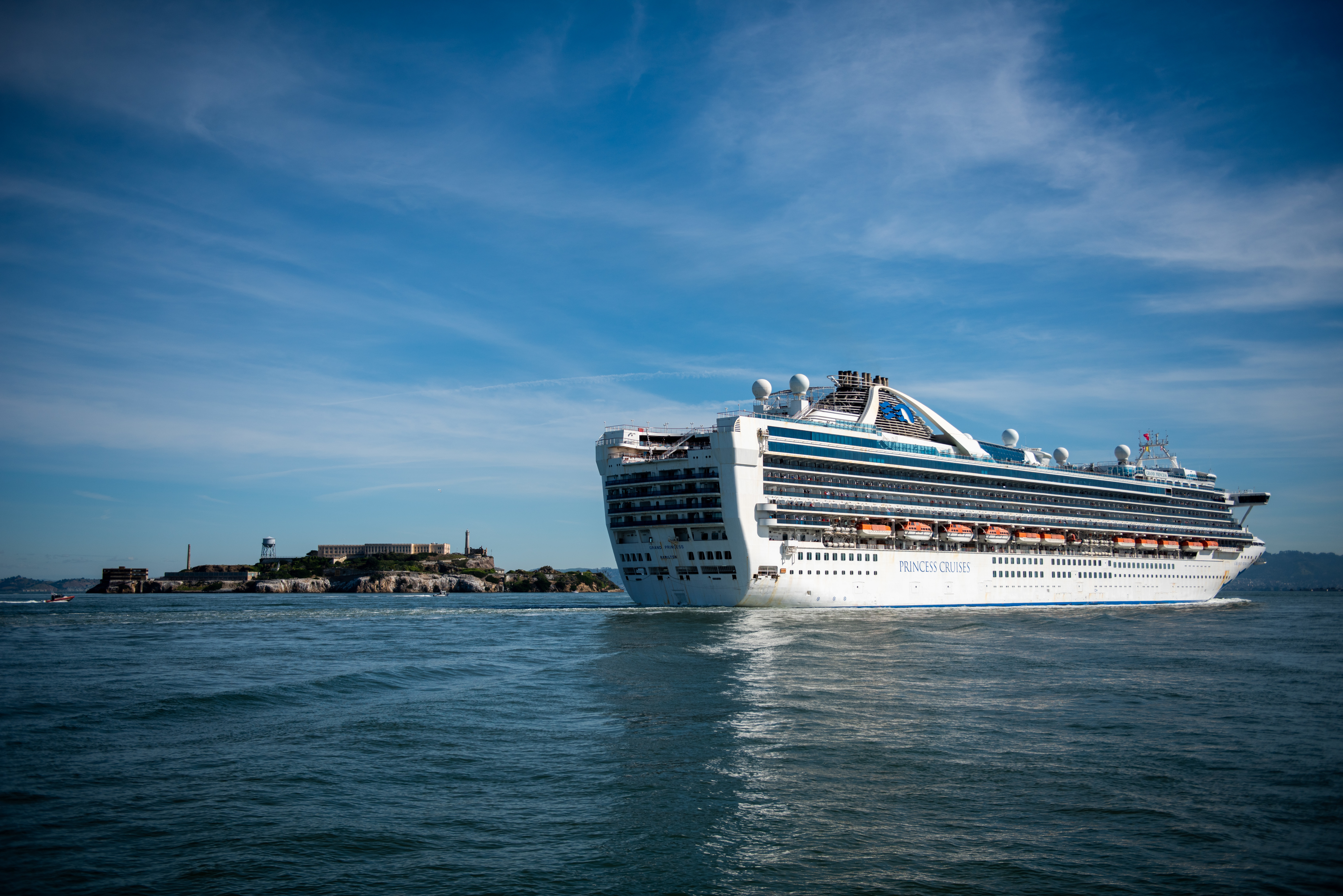
Grand Princess passes Alcatraz Island in San Francisco, California on 8 March 2020

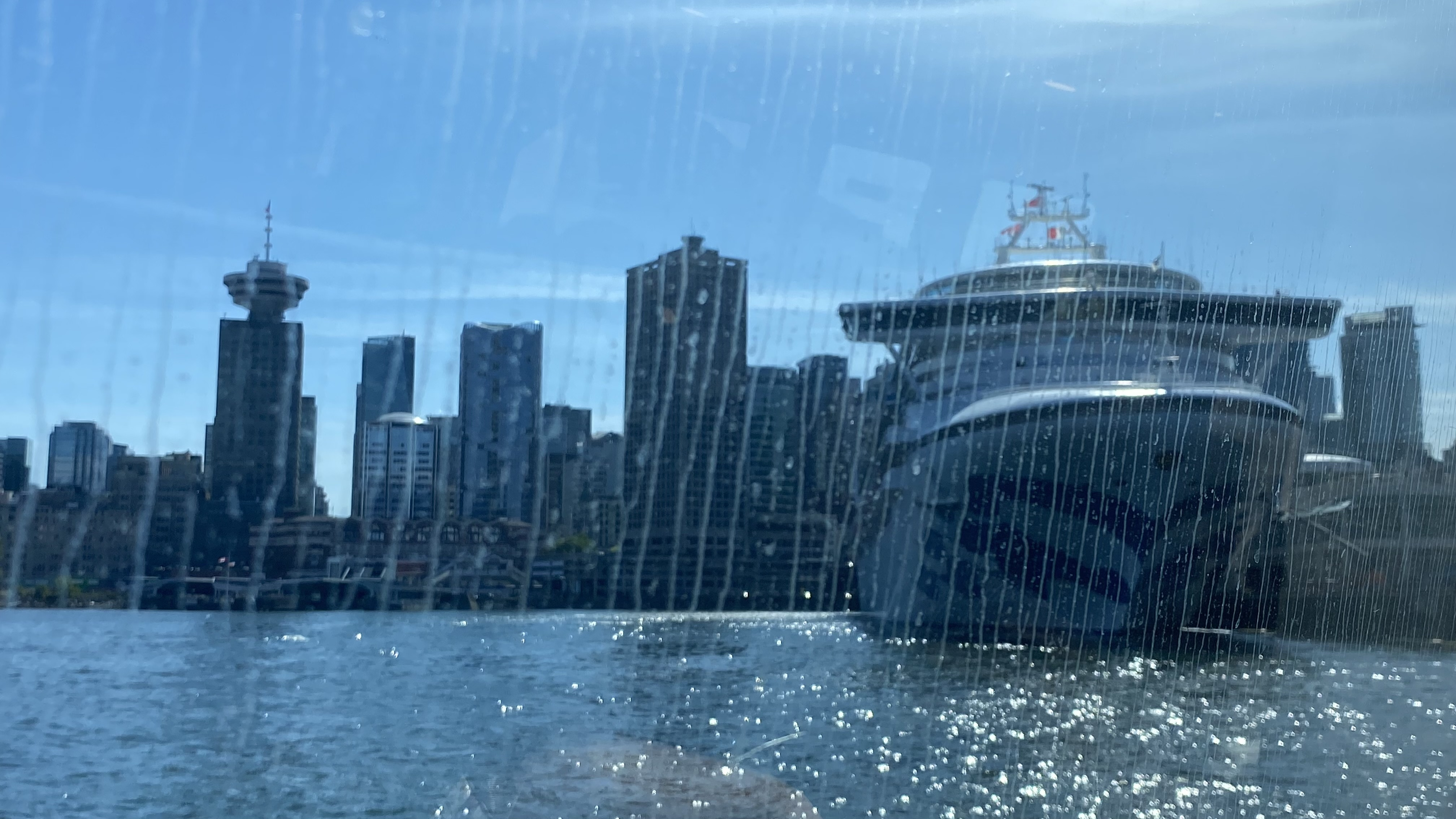
Grand Princess docked at Vancouver, British Columbia, Canada on 22 May 2025

During the initial outbreak of the COVID-19 pandemic in March 2020, former passengers of the ship who had tested positive for SARS-CoV-2 were being linked to cruises they had taken on the ship while it traveled between California, Mexico and Hawaii. After the first confirmed death on 4 March 2020, Grand Princess was rerouted to the San Francisco Bay Area, where it was anchored offshore while test kits were airlifted to the ship. Preliminary testing found 21 positive cases, and the ship later docked in Oakland on 9 March 2020, with over 3,000 people entering quarantine. At least 497 people who were on Grand Princess when it was rerouted are known to have tested positive for the virus, and 7 passengers died in connection to the virus.
