= Caribbean Princess =

Cruise ship owned and operated by Princess Cruises

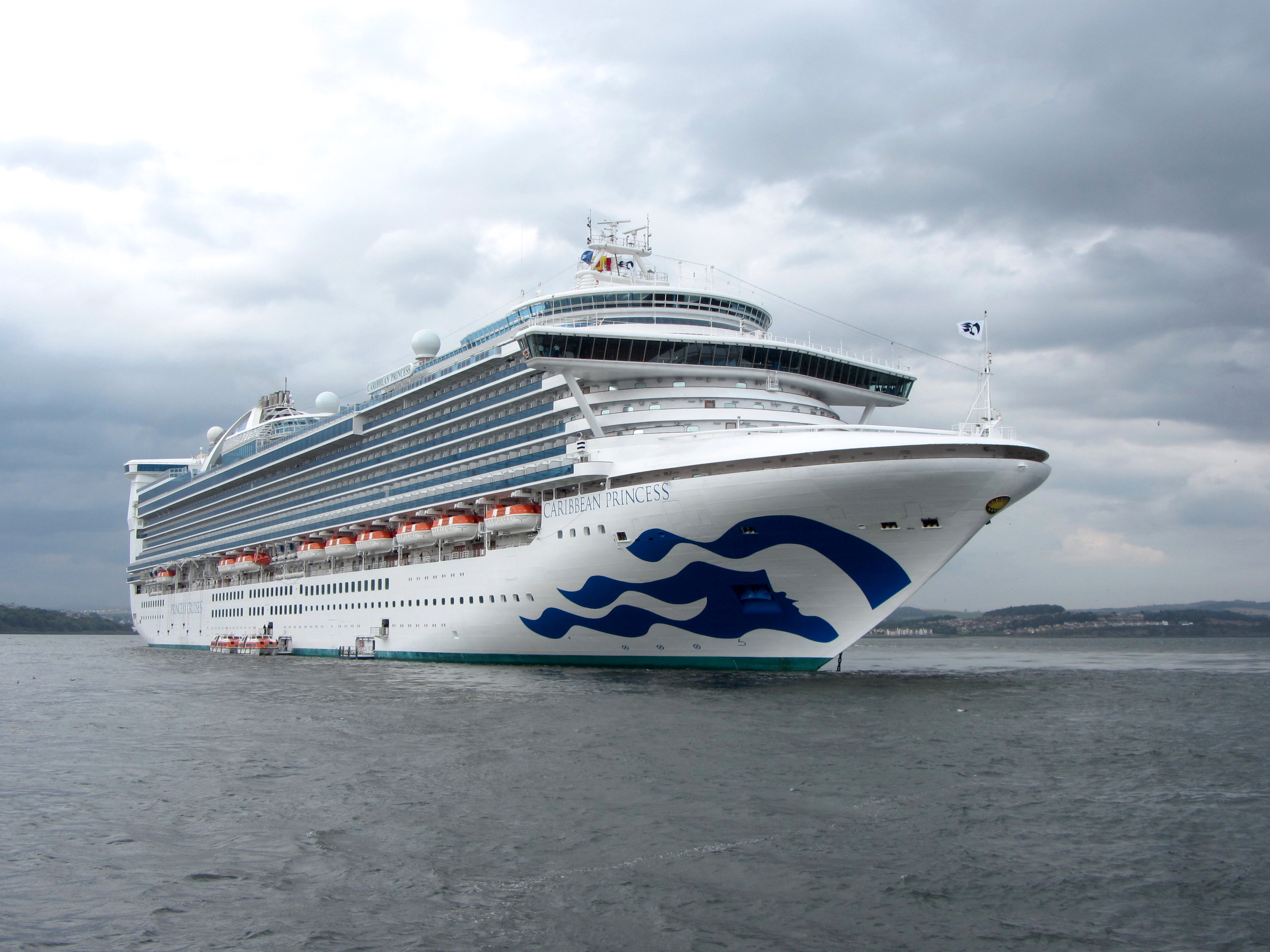
- Caribbean Princess anchored at Firth of Forth in United Kingdom on July 21, 2017

History

Bermuda
- Name: Caribbean Princess
- Owner: Carnival Corporation & plc
- Operator: Princess Cruises
- Port of registry: Hamilton, Bermuda
- Builder: Fincantieri (Monfalcone, Italy)
- Cost: US $500 million
- Launched: 4 July 2003
- Christened: 2 April 2004 by Jill Whelan in Fort Lauderdale
- Maiden voyage: 3 April 2004
- In service: April 2004
- Identification: IMO number: 9215490; Call Sign: ZCDG8; MMSI number: 310423000
- Status: In service

General characteristics
- Class & type: Grand-class cruise ship
- Tonnage: 112,894 GT
- Length: 951 ft (289.9 m)
- Beam: 118 ft (36.0 m)
- Draft: 26.2 ft (8.0 m)
- Decks: 17 total, 15 passenger
- Installed power: 2 diesel-electric propellers (42,000 kW (56,000 hp) each)
- Speed: 22 knots (41 km/h; 25 mph)
- Capacity: 3,142 passengers
- Crew: 1,200 crew

MS Caribbean Princess is a modified Grand-class cruise ship owned and operated by Princess Cruises, with a capacity of over 3,600 passengers, the largest carrying capacity in the Princess fleet until June 2013 when the new Royal Princess, another Princess ship, superseded its record. She has 900 balcony staterooms and a deck of mini-suites.

Caribbean Princess is slightly larger than the other ships in her class (Star Princess, Golden Princess, and Grand Princess), due to an additional deck of cabins called the "Riviera" deck. Another difference is that, being initially designed to cruise the Caribbean year-round, there is no sliding roof over the pool area for shelter in poor weather.

== Incidents ==
On 12 March 2012, Caribbean Princess suffered a problem with her port side propulsion engine that required her to return to her home port of San Juan, Puerto Rico after a stopover in St. Maarten. The problem caused Princess Cruises to cancel the next two trips (scheduled for 18 and 25 March).

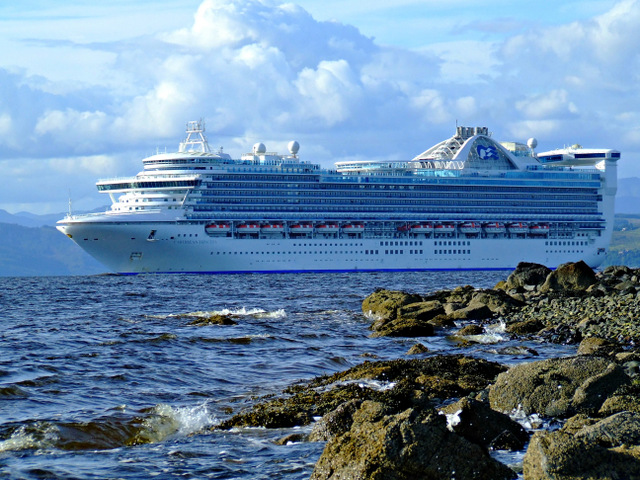
Caribbean Princess is off Cloch Point in Firth of Clyde, Inverclyde, Scotland on July 14, 2012

Caribbean Princess experienced a norovirus outbreak in January 2014 sickening approximately 200 people on board. The scheduled cruise ended two days early.

On 3 August 2016, Caribbean Princess experienced a power outage while on a British Isles cruise. The ship completely lost propulsion about 25 nautical miles (46 km) southeast of Dublin, Ireland in the Irish Sea, and was left adrift for nine hours. During the power outage, air conditioners, lighting, hotel functions, and toilets were all functional. The ship regained power and sailed to Belfast, Northern Ireland, missing her next port of Dublin on her itinerary. An ocean-going tug was dispatched from Holyhead in North Wales, UK and an air/sea rescue helicopter from Dublin monitored the situation. The cruise continued without any further problems to either the ship or the passengers.

In 2019, a man in his 30's drowned in a pool aboard Caribbean Princess.

In May 2026, the Caribbean Princess experienced a norovirus outbreak. Out of 3,116 passengers, 145 (4.7%) fell ill, and out of 1,131 crew, 15 (1.3%) fell ill.

== Ocean pollution ==
On 26 August 2013, the crew of Caribbean Princess deliberately discharged 4,227 US gallons (16,000 L) of oil-contaminated bilge pollution off the southern coast of England. The discharge involved the illegal modification of the vessel's on-board pollution control systems and use of a "magic pipe", and was photographed by a newly hired engineer. When the ship subsequently berthed at Southampton, the engineer resigned his position and reported the discharge to the UK Maritime and Coastguard Agency. An investigation was launched by the United States Department of Justice Environment and Natural Resources Division which found that the practice had been taking place on Caribbean Princess and four other Princess ships since 2005. In December 2016, Princess Cruise Lines agreed to plead guilty to seven felony charges and pay a $40 million penalty. The charges related to illegal discharges off the coasts of Florida, Maine, Massachusetts, New Jersey, New York, Rhode Island, South Carolina, Texas, Virginia, the U.S. Virgin Islands and Puerto Rico. As part of the agreement cruise ships from eight Carnival companies, including Carnival Cruise Line and Holland America Line, are required to operate for five years under a court-supervised environmental compliance plan with independent audits and a court-appointed monitor. According to the US Justice Department, the fine was the "largest-ever criminal penalty involving deliberate vessel pollution."

== Areas of operation ==
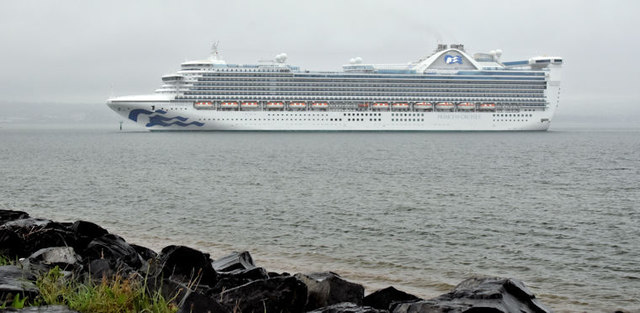
Caribbean Princess arrived in Belfast Lough on May 29, 2017

Caribbean Princess has undertaken cruises from European ports around the British Isles, northern Europe and the Mediterranean and from North American ports to the Caribbean, New England and Canada. The ship in July 2019 left her current home port of Fort Lauderdale, Florida and sailed up to a new home port in New York for cruises to Canada, New England, and Greenland. As of 2020, however, the ship sails primarily in the Caribbean.

Caribbean Princess deployed to Vancouver, British Columbia in May 2025 to start her first-ever Alaska cruise, a 7-day northbound itinerary to Anchorage.
