= MS Azura =

Cruise ship owned by Carnival plc

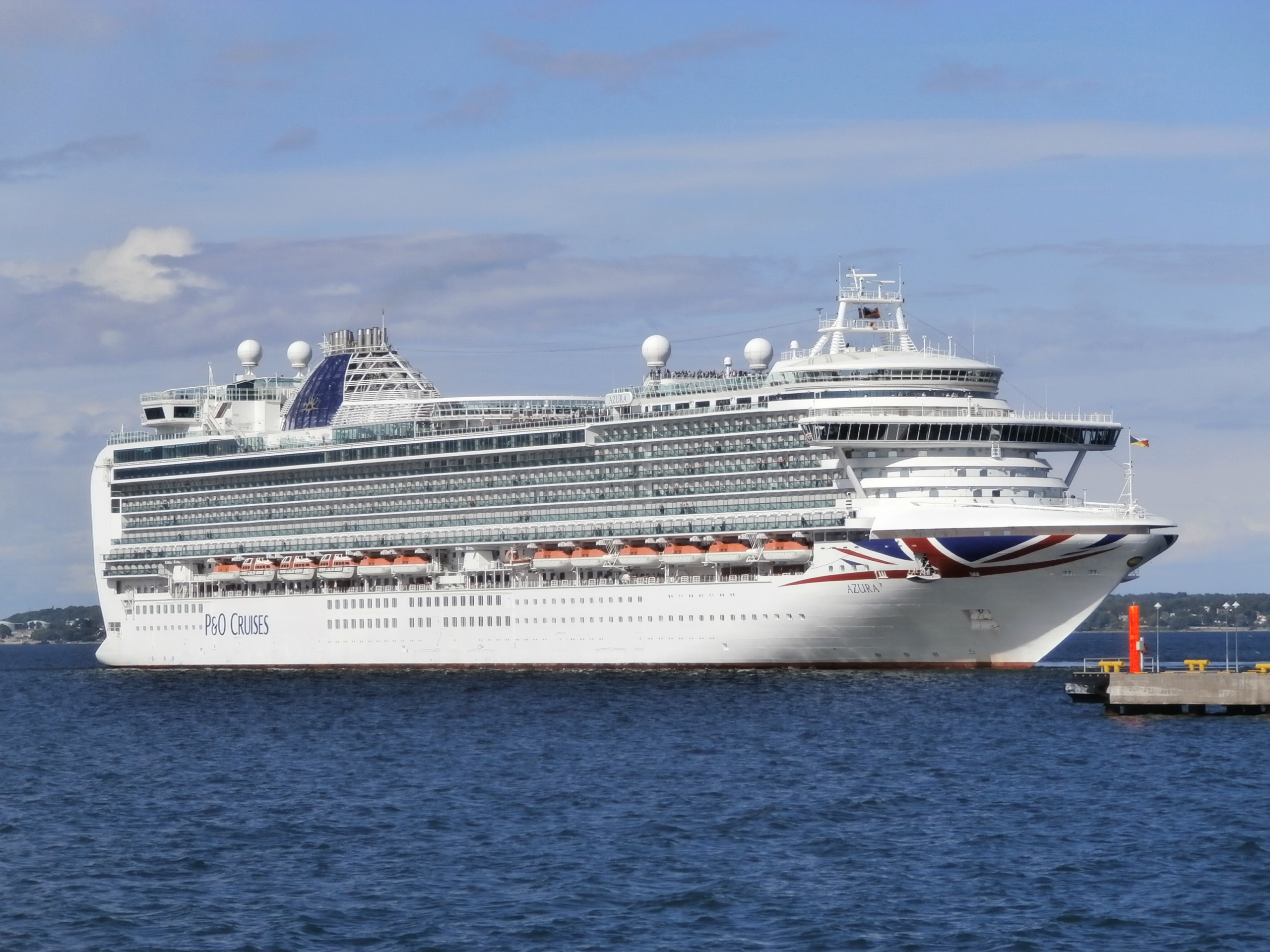
- Azura in Tallinn, 2016.

History

Bermuda
- Name: Azura
- Owner: Carnival Corporation & plc
- Operator: P&O Cruises
- Port of registry: (United Kingdom) Southampton, UK (2010-2011); Hamilton, Bermuda (2011–present)
- Builder: Fincantieri, Italy
- Cost: million
- Yard number: 6166
- Laid down: 27 October 2008
- Launched: 26 June 2009
- Christened: 10 April 2010
- Completed: 1 April 2010
- Maiden voyage: 12 April 2010
- In service: 2010
- Identification: Call sign: ZCEE2; IMO number: 9424883
- Status: In service

General characteristics
- Class & type: Ventura-class cruise ship
- Tonnage: 115,055 GT
- Length: 290.0 m (951 ft 5 in)
- Beam: 36.00 m (118 ft 1 in)
- Draught: 8.7 m (28 ft 7 in)
- Decks: 19; 14 passenger accessible
- Installed power: Six Wärtsilä diesel engines, four 12V46C and two 8L46C, 67.2 MW total
- Propulsion: Two 21 MW (28,350 HP) electric motors with two fixed-pitch propellers, three bow thrusters, three stern thrusters
- Speed: 24 knots (44 km/h; 28 mph)
- Capacity: 3,096 double occupancy; 3,597 maximum passengers
- Crew: 1,226

MS Azura is a cruise ship operated by P&O Cruises and owned by Carnival plc. The ship was built by Fincantieri at their shipyard in Monfalcone, Italy. She officially entered service in April 2010, and was named by Darcey Bussell.

== Delivery ==
Azura is a Ventura Class ship, a subset of Grand-class, with a modified design which distinguishes her from early ships of the same class. Construction of Azura began in 2008 when her keel was officially laid on 27 October 2008. A ceremonial float out took place on Friday 26 June 2009, with Amanda Dowds, wife of the ship's captain, acting as her godmother. The formal handover took place on 26 March 2010.

== Maiden voyage ==
Azura's maiden voyage began on 31 March 2010, when she departed from the Fincantieri shipyard en route to Southampton. She arrived in the UK on 7 April 2010. Azura's first cruise with passengers began on 12 April 2010.

== Naming ==
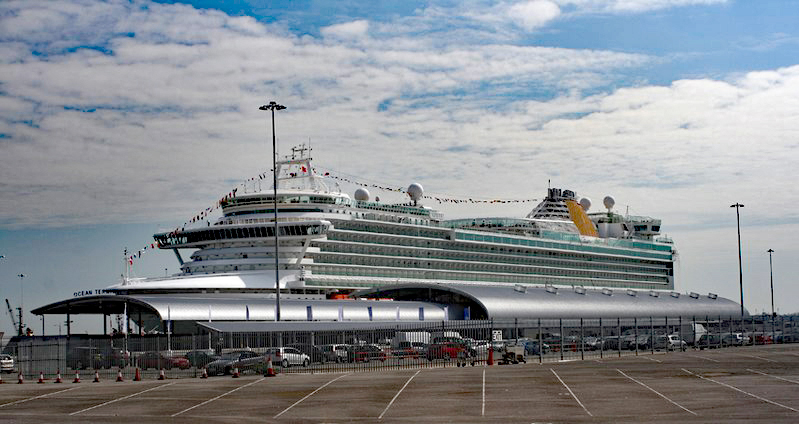
Azura at the Ocean Terminal ahead of her christening

Azura was formally named on 10 April 2010, by godmother Darcey Bussell. As well as performing the traditional bottle breaking ceremony, as a former principal dancer of the Royal Ballet, Bussell presented a dance performance by Royal Ballet School as part of the celebrations. Azura was originally registered in her homeport of Southampton, UK, but in November 2011 she was re-registered to Hamilton, Bermuda to enable wedding ceremonies to be conducted on board.

== Facilities ==
The ship's facilities include a dance floor in the atrium, a show lounge and an interpretation of a London pub. An open-air cinema screen is situated in front of the funnel.

In total, the ship has eleven restaurants and eating areas, twelve bars and places to drink, four pools, a gym, two spas, outdoor cinema, a theatre and two show lounges.

== Design, refits and COVID-19 ==
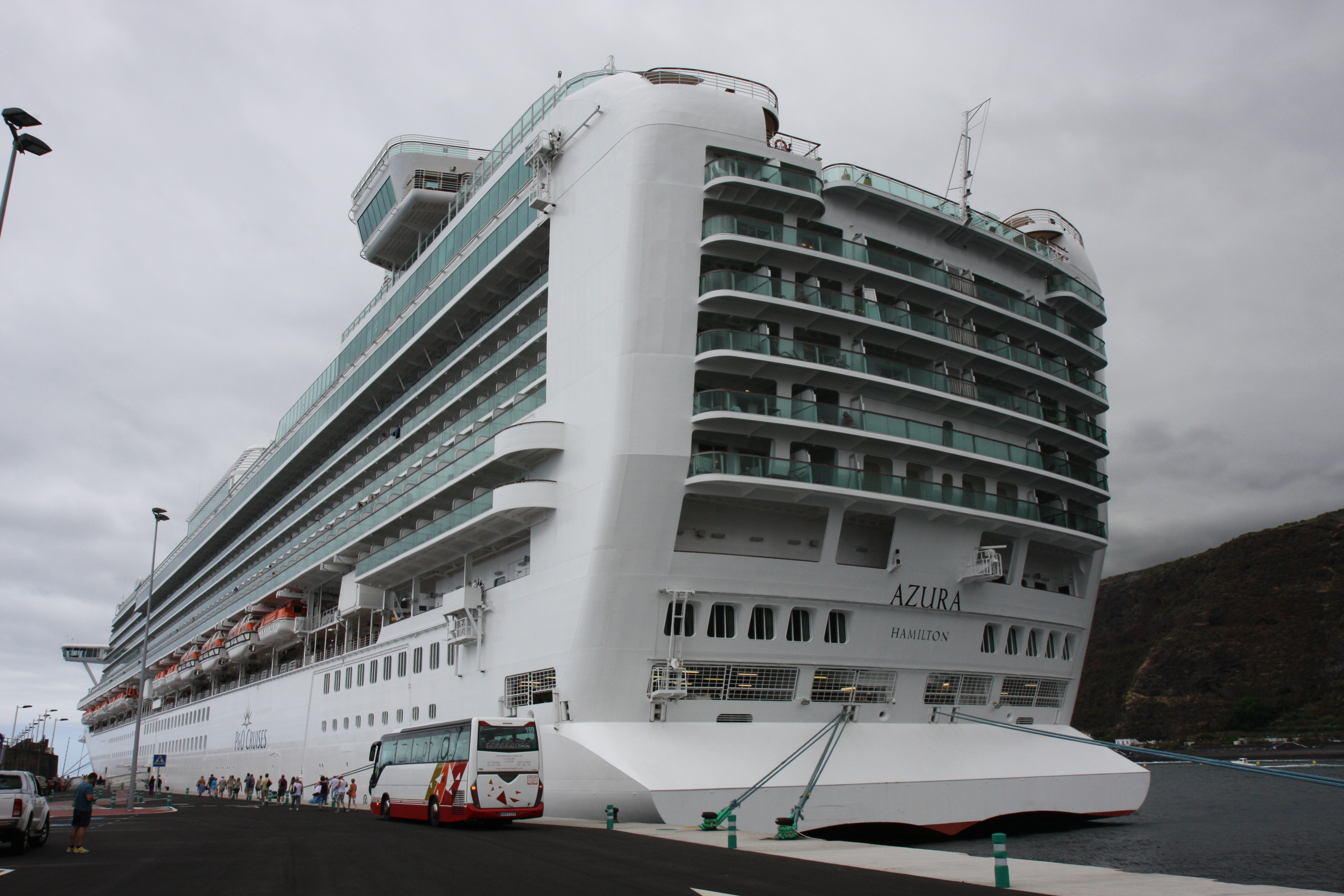
MS Azura, stern view.

Azura is the only Grand-class ship to feature a "Duck Tail" stern.

She completed a minor refit in April 2015 at Blohm and Voss's shipyard in Hamburg. This included painting P&O's large Union flag design on to the bow, repainting the funnel in blue with P&O's "sunburst" logo plus minor interior updates.

Azura was berthed out of use at Port of Tyne International Passenger Terminal, North Shields, Tyne and Wear from 21 January 2021 to June due to the COVID-19 pandemic. She left for Belfast, Northern Ireland, on 29 June 2021 at 06:45 BST where she remained until returned to service.

Azura went in for an extensive refit in March 2025 with updates to restaurants, bars, cabin decor and carpets, corridor carpets, lifts and outdoor furniture.
