= Grand-class cruise ship =

Class of cruise ships

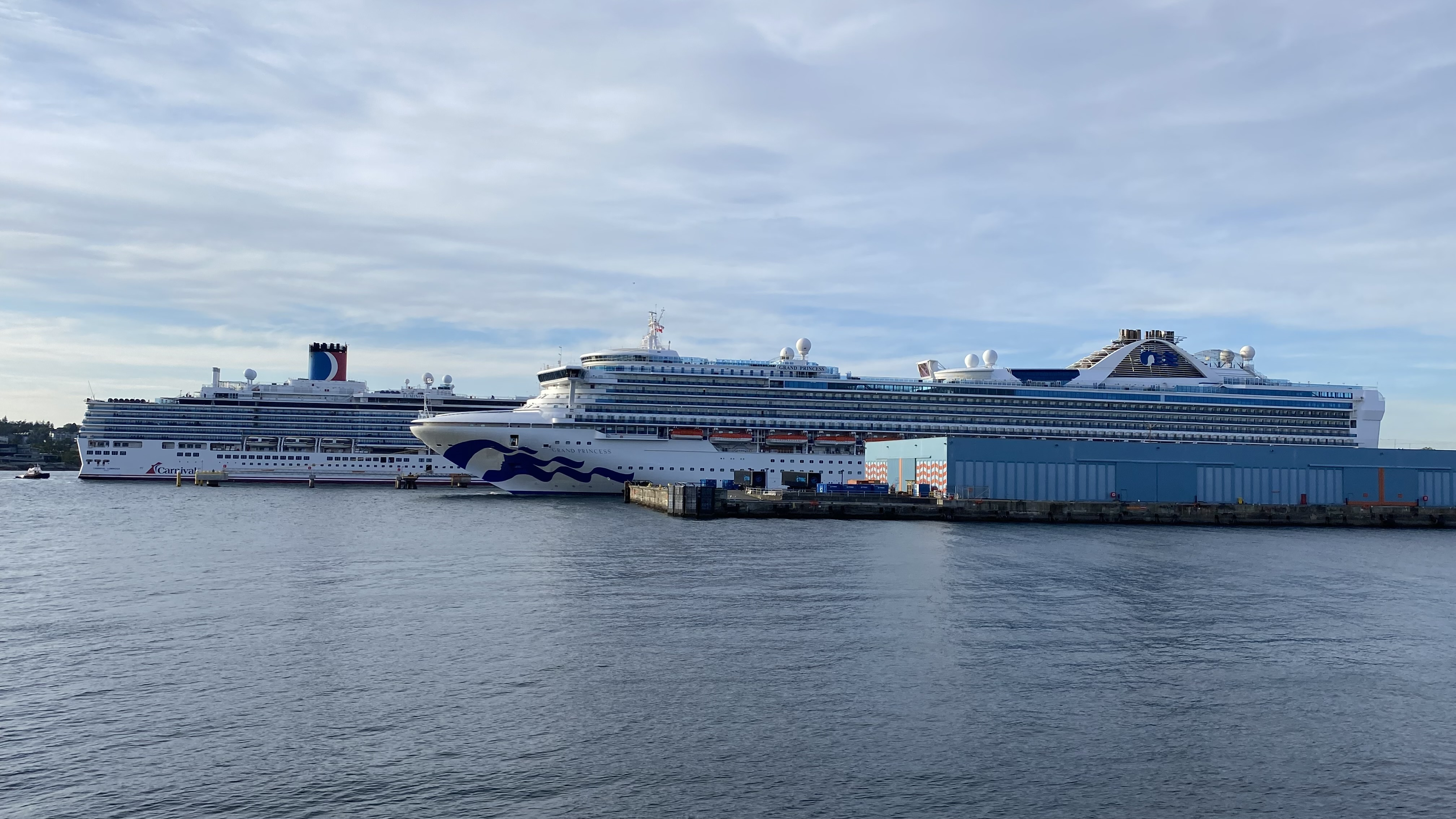
- Grand Princess, the first ship in the class. is docked at Ogden Point with Carnival Luminosa in Victoria, British Columbia, Canada on May 21, 2025

Class overview
- Builders: Fincantieri in Monfalcone, Italy; Mitsubishi Heavy Industries in Nagasaki, Japan
- Operators: Princess Cruises (1998-present); P&O Cruises (2008-present); P&O Cruises Australia (2021-2025); Carnival Cruise Line (2025-present)
- Preceded by: Sun class
- Succeeded by: Royal class
- Subclasses: Gem class; Caribbean class; Crown class; Ventura class
- Built: 1998–2010
- In service: 1998–present
- Completed: 11
- Active: 11

General characteristics
- Type: Cruise ship
- Tonnage: 109,000–116,000 GT
- Length: 951 ft (289.86 m)
- Beam: 118 ft (35.97 m)
- Draught: 26 ft (7.92 m)
- Decks: Grand and Gem class: 17 total, 13 passenger; Caribbean class: 18 total, 14 passenger; Crown class: 19 total, 15 passenger; Ventura class: 19 total, 14 passenger
- Propulsion: Diesel-electric
- Capacity: 2,600–3,114 passengers
- Crew: 1,200

The Grand class is a class of cruise ships. Ships in this class are operated by the cruise lines Princess Cruises, P&O Cruises, P&O Cruises Australia and Carnival Cruise Line. The class consists of several subclasses of sister ships, most of which were built by Fincantieri in Monfalcone and Trieste, northern Italy. The first vessel of the original Grand class, Grand Princess, entered service in 1998.

Ships of the later subclasses are based on the Grand class, but have modifications such as additional decks and varied placement of facilities such as the nightclub and restaurants. The structure used as a nightclub is a signature element of Princess Cruises' ships in the Grand class and derived classes. The nightclub either overhangs the stern of the ship (Grand and Caribbean classes) or is located just aft of the funnel (Gem and Crown classes).

The Gem class of ships is based primarily on the Grand class, but has a much larger funnel, modifies the placement of the nightclub to be just aft of the funnel and also modifies the number of restaurants. The two Gem-class ships were built by Mitsubishi in Nagasaki, Japan in 2004.

The Caribbean class is the third version of the design and has one additional deck. As in the original Grand-class design, the nightclub is suspended on the stern. Caribbean-class vessels also introduced a poolside theater, which was later added to other Princess ships.

The Crown class is the fourth Princess Cruises version of the Grand class and has two additional decks. Crown-class ships have returned the placement of the nightclub adjacent to the funnel. Crown-class ships also feature a poolside theater like the Caribbean class.

The Ventura class has 19 decks like the Crown class. These ships both owned and operated by P&O Cruises and are marketed as Grand class, although they were given the Ventura class designation because they are not owned by Princess and are totally modified internally and externally. Ventura is also the largest ship in the Grand class. The second Ventura-class ship is MS Azura, launched in March 2010 which has a modified stern. Azura is also the only P&O Cruises ship to feature a poolside theater style outdoor screen.

== Ships ==
Ship	Built	Builder	Entered service	Gross Tonnage	Flag	Notes	Image
Grand class
Grand Princess	1998	Fincantieri	1998–present	107,517 tons	Bermuda	Largest and most expensive ship built in 1998 - Last refurbished in March 2019 - Former flagship of Princess fleet before Royal Princess' construction in 2013.	
Carnival Adventure	2001	Fincantieri	2001–present	108,865 tons	Bahamas	Formerly, Golden Princess. Last refurbished in 2022. Transferred to P&O Cruises Australia in 2020 & Transferred to Carnival Cruise Line in 2025 from Princess Cruises.	
Carnival Encounter	2002	Fincantieri	2002–present	108,977 tons	Bahamas	Formerly, Star Princess. Fire swept through berths in 2006. Last refurbished in 2022. Transferred to P&O Cruises Australia in 2020 & Transferred to Carnival Cruise Line in 2025 from Princess Cruises.	
Gem class
Design differences on these ships are the relocation of the nightclub to directly aft of the funnel, rather than suspended over the stern, and the much larger funnel. The two Gem-class ships, Diamond Princess and Sapphire Princess, are the only two ships based on the Grand class to be built at Mitsubishi's Nagasaki Yard.
Diamond Princess	2004	Mitsubishi	2004–present	115,875 tons	United Kingdom	Originally named Sapphire Princess	
Sapphire Princess	2004	Mitsubishi	2004–present	115,875 tons	United Kingdom	Originally named Diamond Princess	
Caribbean class
The design for Caribbean Princess derives directly from the original Grand-class ships, with none of the Gem-class modifications being included. Caribbean Princess uses the original Grand-class design, but with an additional deck. This additional deck increases the ship's passenger capacity from 2,600 to 3,100. Caribbean Princess was also the first ship to have a poolside theater. The three ships in the Crown class, Crown Princess, Emerald Princess, and Ruby Princess, were later built with this feature also included. It has since been added to all of the ships in the class.
Caribbean Princess	2004	Fincantieri	2004–present	112,894 tons	Bermuda	Last refurbished in April 2017	
Crown class
These ships, which build on Caribbean Princess' design, also differ slightly. These ships have two more passenger decks than the original Grand class as well as the poolside theater. A nightclub is aft of the funnel.
Crown Princess	2006	Fincantieri	2006–present	113,561 tons	Bermuda	Major listing incident in 2006	
Emerald Princess	2007	Fincantieri	2007–present	113,561 tons	Bermuda		
Ruby Princess	2008	Fincantieri	2008–present	113,561 tons	Bermuda		
Ventura class
Ships in the Ventura class are based on the Crown-class design. The ships in this class are owned and operated by P&O Cruises. Azura has a modified stern.
Ventura	2008	Fincantieri	2008–present	116,017 tons	Bermuda	The largest cruise ship to enter service with P&O Cruises, and the British market, until 2015.	
Azura	2010	Fincantieri	2010–present	115,055 tons	Bermuda	Azura has a modified stern.	
