= Ruby Princess =

Cruise ship

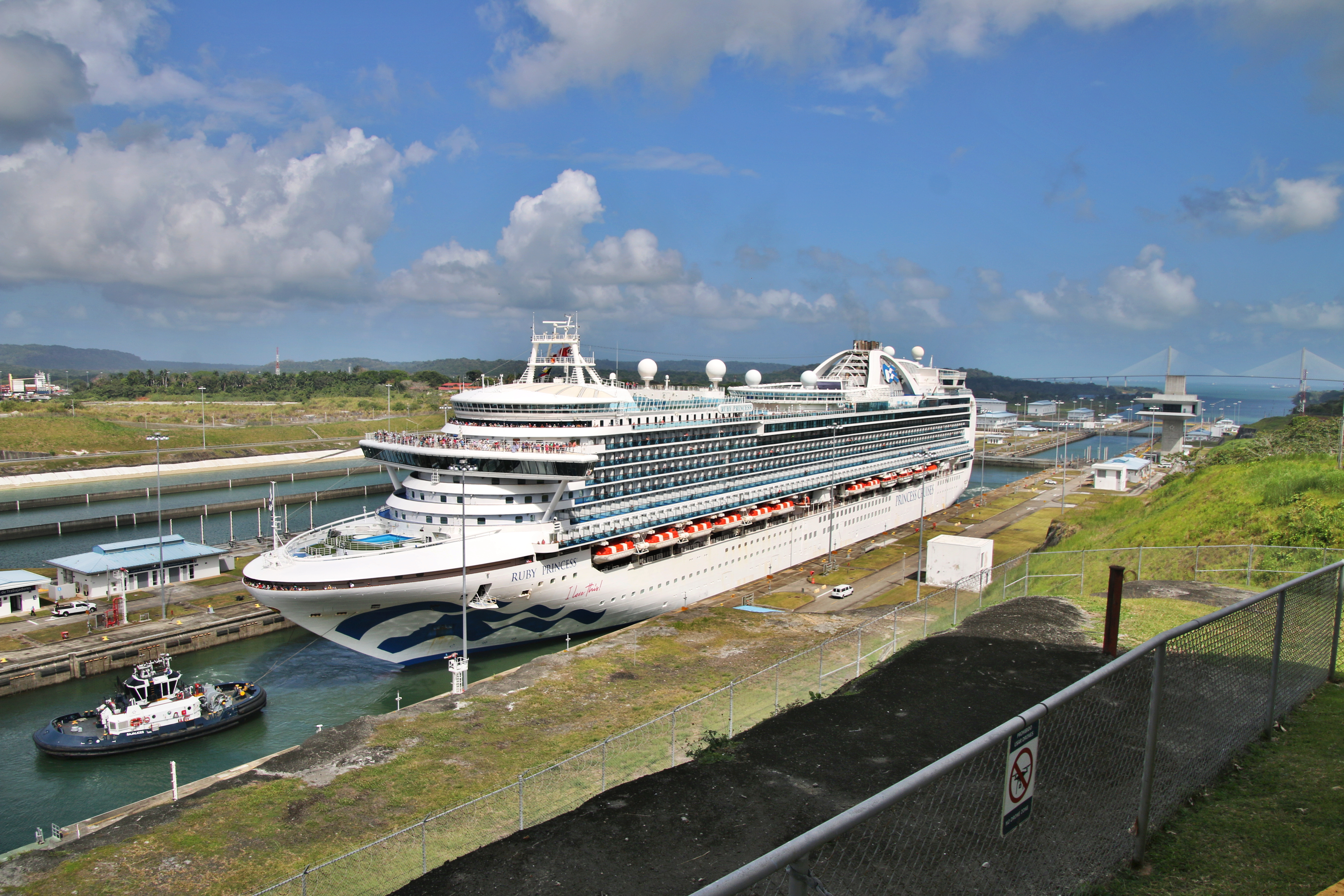
- Ruby Princess in the Panama Canal on 4 March 2024

History

Bermuda
- Name: Ruby Princess
- Owner: Carnival Corporation & plc
- Operator: Princess Cruises
- Port of registry: Hamilton, Bermuda
- Ordered: 2007
- Builder: Fincantieri, Monfalcone, Trieste
- Cost: US$400,000,000
- Yard number: 6150
- Laid down: June 2007
- Launched: 1 February 2008
- Sponsored by: Trista Sutter and Ryan Sutter
- Christened: 6 November 2008
- Completed: October 2008
- Acquired: 23 October 2008
- Maiden voyage: 8 November 2008
- In service: November 2008
- Identification: IMO number: 9378462; Call Sign: ZCDY2; MMSI number: 310567000
- Status: In service

General characteristics
- Class & type: Crown-class cruise ship
- Tonnage: 113,561 GT
- Length: 951 ft (290 m)
- Beam: 118 ft (36 m)
- Draught: 8 m (26 ft)
- Decks: 19 decks
- Installed power: 4 × V12 Wärtsilä Common Rail diesel generator, 2 × inline 8 Wärtsilä Common Rail diesel generators.
- Propulsion: Twin propellers
- Speed: 23 knots (43 km/h; 26 mph)
- Capacity: 3,080 passengers
- Crew: 1,100

Ruby Princess is a Crown-class cruise ship operated by Princess Cruises, a subsidiary of Carnival Corporation & plc. At 113,561 GT, the vessel is the third and last in a series of three ships, known as the Crown class, that was built with design modifications distinguishing them from their older Grand-class sister ships. Delivered in 2008 by Italian shipbuilder Fincantieri, Ruby Princess also became the ninth and final Grand-class ship to join the Princess Cruises fleet. Over 20 passengers on the ship died from Covid-19 in March 2020.

== Design ==
Ruby Princess continued the modified Grand-class design with the Night Club moved just aft of the funnel, rather than suspended over the stern like the original designs. By gross tonnage, she was the largest ship in the Princess fleet until the arrival of the Royal Princess in 2013.

== Construction and career ==
Built by Italian shipbuilder Fincantieri in Monfalcone and Trieste, Italy, Ruby Princess was delivered to Princess Cruises in Monfalcone on 23 October 2008. She set sail for her inaugural homeport of Port Everglades in Fort Lauderdale, Florida for an arrival of 4 November 2008, where she was later christened on 6 November 2008 by The Bachelorette star Trista Sutter and her husband, Ryan. The ship operated her maiden voyage on 8 November 2008 with a Western Caribbean itinerary and concluded her inaugural season with a series of voyages in the Mediterranean in summer 2009.

=== COVID-19 pandemic ===
The ship became infamous in 2020 during the COVID-19 pandemic, as the source of over 10% of Australia's early COVID-19 cases. By August, the total number of deaths associated with the ship was 28 and the number of infections was estimated at no fewer than 900. A cluster of cases in New Zealand was also linked to the ship.

On 8 March 2020, Ruby Princess departed Sydney, Australia for a 13-night cruise around New Zealand. Intended ports of call were Fiordland National Park (scenic cruising), Port Chalmers (for Dunedin), Akaroa, Wellington, Napier, Tauranga, Auckland, and Paihia (for the Bay of Islands). The cruise was cut short on 15 March and Ruby Princess returned direct to Sydney from Napier.

Ruby Princess' visit to Napier on 15 March 2020 led to a cluster of 16 COVID-19 cases there.

On 19 March 2020, the ship arrived back in Sydney, New South Wales two days early from the New Zealand cruise, docking at 3 a.m., as some COVID-19 swabs needed to be tested as an urgent matter. The ship disembarked 2,700 passengers later that morning. The state health minister, Brad Hazzard announced on 20 March 2020 that 13 of the people on the ship had been tested for the SARS-CoV-2 coronavirus, and 3 of them were positive. New South Wales health authorities asked all passengers to go into self-isolation. It was announced on 24 March that one passenger had died and 133 on the ship had tested positive for the coronavirus.

As of 30 March, at least 440 passengers had tested positive for the virus: 211 were in New South Wales, 71 in South Australia, 70 in Queensland, 43 in Western Australia, 22 in the Australian Capital Territory, 18 in Victoria, three in Tasmania and two in the Northern Territory. By 31 March, five of them had died, one in the Australian Capital Territory, two in Tasmania, one in New South Wales and one in Queensland. By 2 April, cases in New South Wales had risen to 337 passengers and 3 crew members, and total passenger cases had risen to at least 576, excluding passengers who left Australia without being tested.

On 1 April, the ship was off Port Botany, New South Wales. The International Transport Workers' Federation had called on the Australian government to allow the crew members to be disembarked so that they could be flown to their countries of residence. At that time there were 15,000 crew members in 18 cruise ships sitting off the Australian coast. Six from Ruby Princess had been medically evacuated. Aspen Medical was contracted to carry out medical assessments on the ship and visited it on 2 April.

Another three passengers from the ship were reported dead in New South Wales on 5 April, and a fourth in Queensland. Another died in Western Australia on 6 April followed by one in Tasmania on 7 April, bringing total deaths to 13. The death toll reached 21 on 18 April 2020 with the death of a second man in the United States. About 900 passengers from countries other than Australia left Sydney after the ships arrival there; few specifics are known about infections or deaths in this group. The death toll was reported to have reached 22 on 13 May, with the death of an 81 year old passenger. According to an inquiry by Bret Walker SC for the New South Wales government, the eventual death toll was at least 28, including eight from the United States.

There had been 662 confirmed cases of the virus, including 342 in New South Wales. 11 cases of secondary transmission from people infected on the ship had been reported, which had not led to any deaths.

As of 8 April, the ship's crew of about 1,000 remained on board, with 200 exhibiting flu-like symptoms; 18 had tested positive for COVID-19. The vessel moored at Port Kembla on 5 April 2020. 542 crew members were taken off the ship for repatriation to Brazil, Canada, France, Germany, Japan, Ireland, Mexico, New Zealand, the Philippines, the United Kingdom and the United States between 21 and 23 April. 190 members of the crew have tested positive for the virus. The ship left Port Kembla on 23 April. On 7 May, the ship arrived in Manila and disembarked 214 Filipino crew members.

==== Criminal investigation ====
On 5 April 2020, New South Wales Police Force launched a criminal investigation into whether the operator of the ship, Carnival Australia, violated the Biosecurity Act 2015 (Cwth) and New South Wales state laws, by deliberately concealing COVID-19 cases. A report by The Guardian's Matilda Boseley commented: "Since the ship's 2,700 passengers were allowed to freely disembark in Sydney on 19 March, federal and state authorities have been pinballing blame."

On 7 April 2020, it was reported that the New Zealand Prime Minister, Jacinda Ardern, had requested Crown Law to check whether her country's laws had been broken.

As of the evening of 8 April, 30 investigators had been assigned to Strike Force Bast, which was looking into the Ruby Princess case: as to "the communications, actions, and other circumstances that led to the docking and disembarking of the vessel" without a quarantine. The ship's voyage data recorder had been seized.

==== Special Commission of enquiry ====
On 15 April, the NSW State Government announced a Special Commission of inquiry to investigate events surrounding the Ruby Princess. The commission was headed by barrister Bret Walker.

The Commission held hearings on 22 and 23 April for crew members prior to the ship leaving Port Kembla for Manila, late on 23 April. It published its report on 14 August 2020.

==== Biosecurity review ====
The Australian Inspector-General of Biosecurity also conducted a review of at-border delivery of human biosecurity functions in regard to the Ruby Princess incident. His report was released on 29 April 2021 and found that inspection protocols were not followed as unwell passengers should have been screened individually by following a checklist but this was not done. The report made over 40 recommendations to improve Australia's human biosecurity management on ships.

==== 2022 outbreaks ====
In April 2022, Ruby Princess and 52 other cruise ships were under investigation by the CDC for excessive COVID-19 outbreaks on board their vessels since the start of the year. In January, 12 passengers on a Ruby Princess cruise to Mexico tested positive for the virus, while more than 70 people were found to have COVID-19 on the same ship after it returned from a trip to the Panama Canal in March. On a third cruise in April to Hawaii, 143 passengers on the Ruby Princess tested positive.

Passengers on the Hawaii trip stated that it was quite clear that a large number of passengers were ill, but unless they self-reported, they were free to move around the ship. All people on the Hawaii cruise were vaccinated. One person was hospitalised.

=== 2023 San Francisco allision ===
On 6 July 2023, Ruby Princess made "unexpected contact" with the Port of San Francisco's Pier 27, described as a "hard landing", while docking at the completion of a ten-day cruise to Alaska. The allision woke some passengers during the early morning arrival and punctured the aft hull of the ship. Crews patched the hole the following day and the cruise line announced that it was "confident" the ship would soon be cleared to depart. However, after the United States Coast Guard required additional repairs to be made, the ship's departure was delayed by a further 36 hours, until 9 July, reducing the intended ten-day Alaska voyage to seven days, with calls at Ketchikan, Alaska and Prince Rupert, British Columbia only.

== See also ==
- Pratique
