= Carnival Adventure =

Grand-class cruise ship operated by Carnival (Formerly P&O Australia)

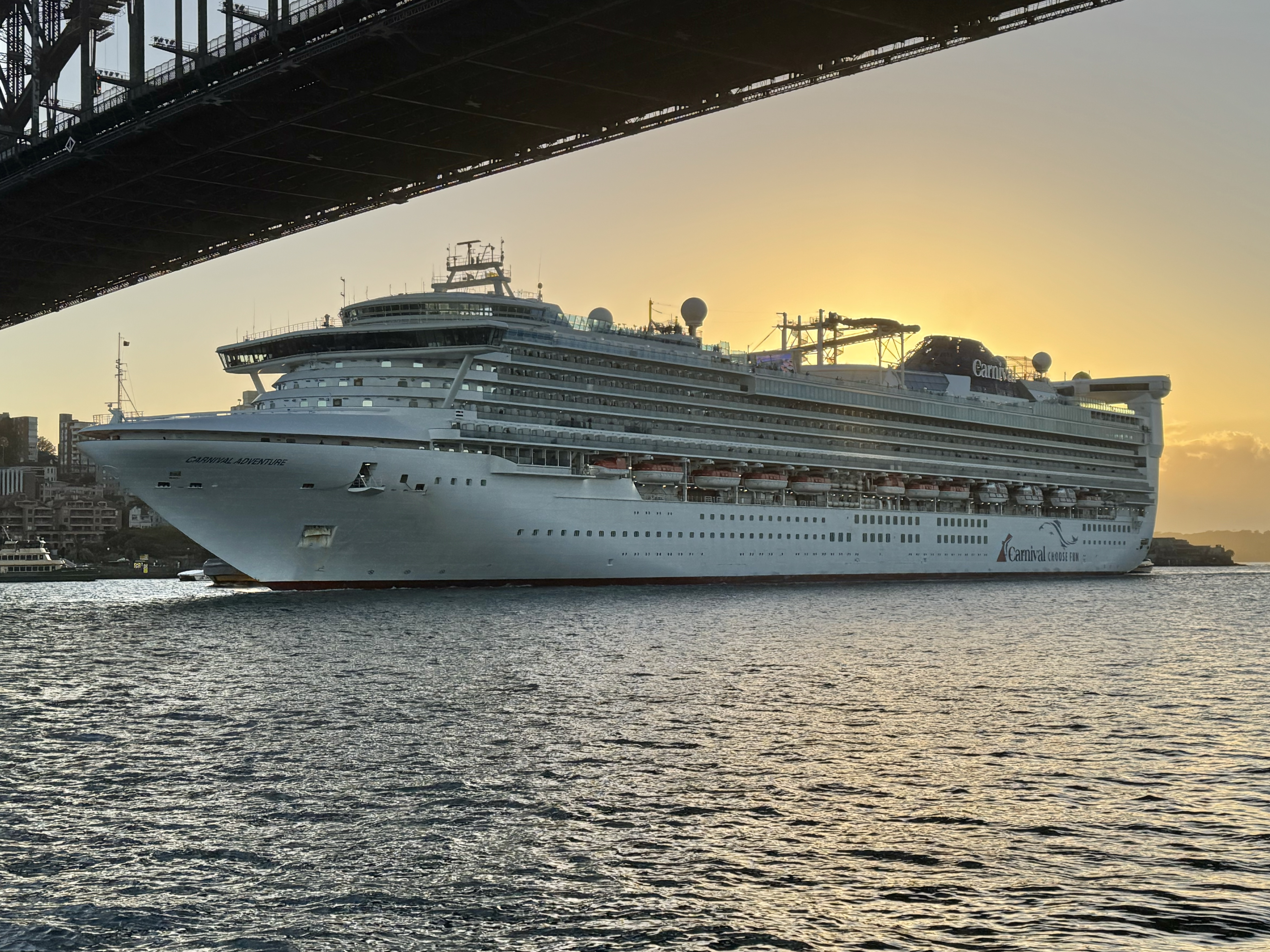
- Carnival Adventure arriving in Sydney, Australia on 20 April 2026

History

Bahamas
- Name: Golden Princess (2001–2021); Pacific Adventure (2021–2025); Carnival Adventure (2025–present)
- Owner: Carnival Corporation & plc
- Operator: Princess Cruises (2001–2021); P&O Cruises Australia (2021–2025); Carnival Cruise Line (2025–present)
- Port of registry: 2001–2021 Hamilton, (Bermuda); 2021–2025 London, (United Kingdom); 2025–present Nassau, (The Bahamas)
- Ordered: January 1998
- Builder: Fincantieri; Monfalcone, Italy
- Cost: US$425 million
- Yard number: 6050
- Launched: 31 August 2000
- Sponsored by: Merlisa George
- Christened: 17 April 2002
- Completed: 2001
- Maiden voyage: 16 May 2001 (Golden Princess); October 2020 (Pacific Adventure); 29 March 2025 (Carnival Adventure)
- In service: 2001
- Home port: Sydney, Australia
- Identification: Callsign: ZCDA9; IMO number: 9192351; MMSI number: 310344000
- Status: In service

General characteristics
- Class & type: Grand-class cruise ship
- Tonnage: 109,000 GT
- Length: 290 m (951 ft 5 in)
- Beam: 36 m (118 ft 1 in)
- Draught: 8.05 m (26 ft 5 in)
- Decks: 17 total decks; 13 passenger decks
- Installed power: 4 × Sulzer 16 ZAV diesel generators producing 11,520 kW (15,450 hp) each; 2 × Sulzer 12 ZAV diesel generators producing 8,640 kW (11,590 hp) each
- Propulsion: 2 × diesel-electric propulsion motors producing 19,000 kW (25,000 hp) each
- Speed: 23 knots (43 km/h; 26 mph)
- Capacity: 2,600 passengers
- Crew: 1,100

Carnival Adventure is a Grand-class cruise ship operated by Carnival Cruise Line. The ship was previously named Golden Princess and Pacific Adventure. She was built by Italian shipbuilder Fincantieri at Monfalcone, delivered in 2001, and christened by Merlisa George in Saint Thomas in April 2002. While operating as Golden Princess, she has sailed to all seven continents, beginning with her debut in Southampton in May 2001, followed by seasonal deployments serving regions around the Caribbean Sea and Europe. In 2007, she circumnavigated South America and debuted along the West Coast of the United States before also sailing around ports in Asia and Oceania bordering the Pacific Ocean until 2020. In 2017, Carnival Corporation announced Golden Princess would be transferred from Princess to sister brand P&O Cruises Australia as a part of P&O's fleet renewal. As Pacific Adventure, sailing itineraries included those around Oceania along with her sister ship Pacific Encounter. In 2024, Carnival Corporation announced that P&O would be integrated into its sister line, Carnival Cruise Line, in March 2025 and cease to exist. As of March 2025, Pacific Adventure was transferred to Carnival and renamed Carnival Adventure respectively.

== Design ==
Princess made several changes to the design of Golden Princess compared with Grand Princess, including a modified stern. Princess commissioned Golden Princess to have similar dimensions to Grand Princess: they both measure 109,000 gross tonnage (GT) and have an approximate capacity of 2,600 passengers. Additionally, they have a length of 290.0 metres (951 ft 5 in), a draught of 8.05 metres (26 ft 5 in), and a beam of 36 metres (118 ft 1 in). Golden Princess is powered by a diesel-electric genset system, with six Sulzer engines: four producing 11,520 kilowatts (15,450 hp) and two producing 8,640 kilowatts (11,590 hp). Main propulsion is via two diesel-electric propellers. The system gives the vessel a maximum speed of 23 knots (43 km/h; 26 mph). The ship has 1,299 passenger cabins and 627 crew cabins. She has a maximum capacity of 4,160 passengers and crew.

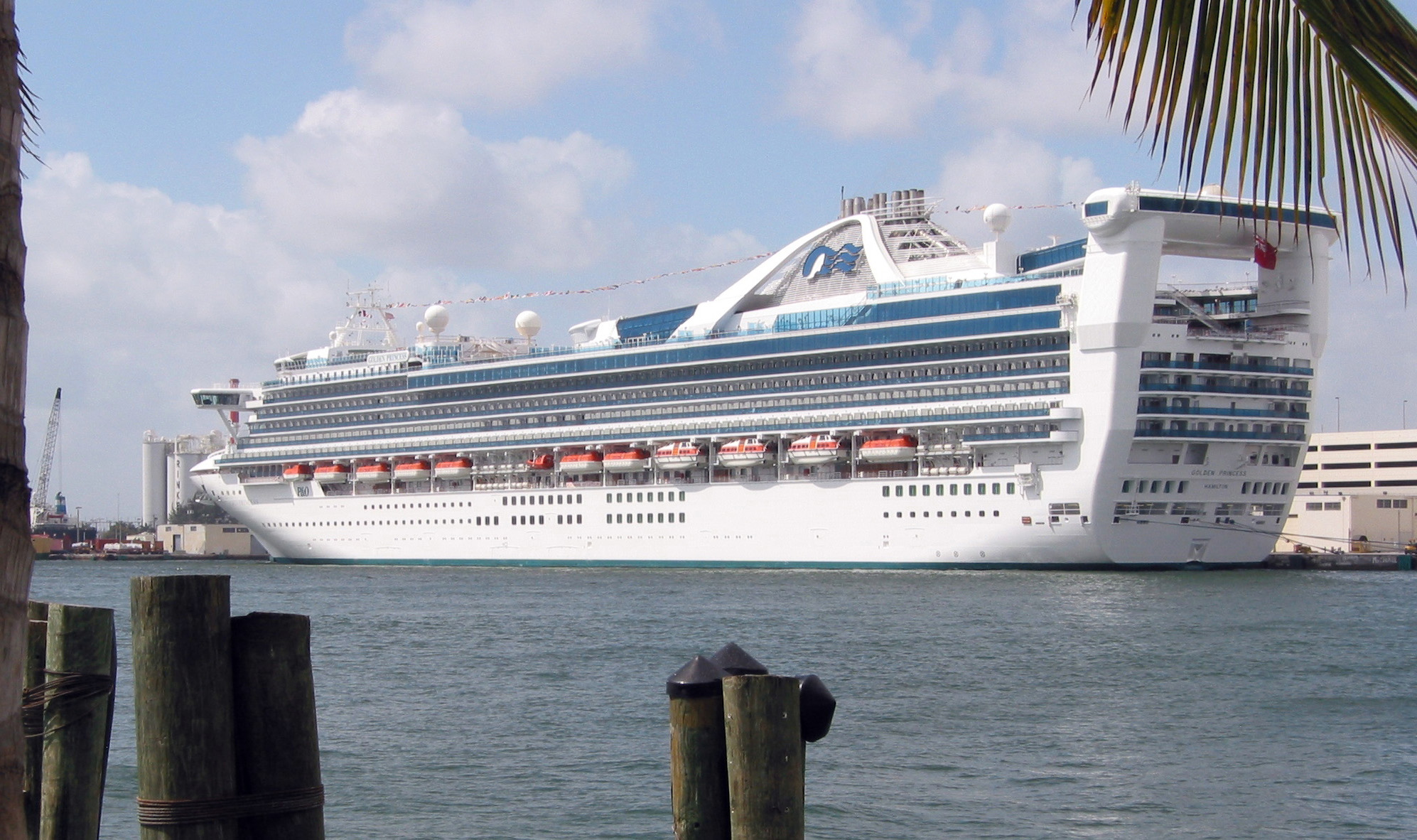
Golden Princess docked at Fort Lauderdale, Florida, on 1 March 2004

On board, Golden Princess retains much of the design of Grand Princess, aside from several changes. Instead of the slanted bulkheads of the tiered decks below her sister ship's navigation bridge, she has flat bulkheads. Additionally, in order to reduce the ship's weight, she features a modified stern made of lighter materials, particularly in the "handle," which housed the ship's nightclub.

== Service history ==
=== Golden Princess ===
In January 1998, Princess announced it was ordering two additional Grand-class ships at a cost of approximately US$425 million each from Italian shipbuilder Fincantieri for delivery in 2001.

The first ship, named Golden Princess, was floated out on 31 August 2000 at Monfalcone. She sailed her maiden voyage on 16 May 2001. She was originally planned to be christened by Jane Seymour on 12 October 2001, but was later christened by Merlisa George, Miss US Virgin Islands 2002, on 17 April 2002 in Saint Thomas.

==== COVID-19 ====
The 2019–2020 season marked the last active season that the ship sailed as Golden Princess. She began with weekly Alaska voyages in summer 2019 before returning to Melbourne in fall 2019. In March 2020, during a round-trip sailing from Melbourne to New Zealand amid the COVID-19 pandemic, three passengers were quarantined onboard after one was suspected of having the coronavirus when they began developing symptoms. At the time of the announcement, the ship was bound for Akaroa and proceeded to anchor in Akaroa Harbour to allow for medical officials to test the guests, who ultimately tested negative. The remainder of the voyage was subsequently cancelled and the ship was cleared to return to Melbourne, following the Australian government's ordinance for all cruise ships to return to their homeports. The ship returned on 19 March 2020 and all guests finally disembarked around 6:00pm after some of the guests were tested earlier in the day, and none of those tests returned positive. Golden Princess was scheduled to perform a full season of Alaska voyages from Los Angeles in summer 2020 and a final transpacific crossing to Singapore in fall 2020, but due to the pandemic, all sailings of the ship were suspended. There were rumors of the vessel possibly being sold for scrap instead of being transferred to P&O Australia, but Carnival Corporation denied the rumors and later did transfer the vessel.

=== Pacific Adventure ===
P&O Cruises Australia, as a part of its "fleet enhancement plan." The new ship, scheduled for delivery in 2019, would become P&O's first-ever new-build vessel and its largest ship overall in the fleet. However, in December 2016, the order for the new ship was transferred to sister brand Carnival Cruise Line (CCL) in exchange for Carnival Splendor joining the P&O fleet instead. In a statement, P&O president Sture Myrmell conceded that the market's current infrastructure and its anticipated pace of development would be inadequate to support the brand's earlier, more ambitious expansion goals. But in September 2017, Carnival issued a further fleet realignment, announcing Golden Princess would transfer to P&O, with Carnival Splendor continuing to operate for CCL. In September 2018, after hosting an online naming contest, P&O announced Golden Princess would be renamed Pacific Adventure and debut in October 2020, featuring modified accommodations and onboard facilities designed in-line with the P&O brand.

In October 2018, P&O unveiled the inaugural schedule for Pacific Adventure, with cruises of various lengths from Australian ports, visiting New Zealand, Fiji, Papua New Guinea, and other destinations in Oceania, beginning in October 2020. However, the COVID-19 pandemic led P&O to halt its operations, and this delayed the ship's debut until 2022. Australian cruises were suspended in March 2020, with the ban finally being lifted on 17 April 2022. The ship was transferred in October 2020, but she did not enter service until 2022 because of the COVID-19 pandemic.

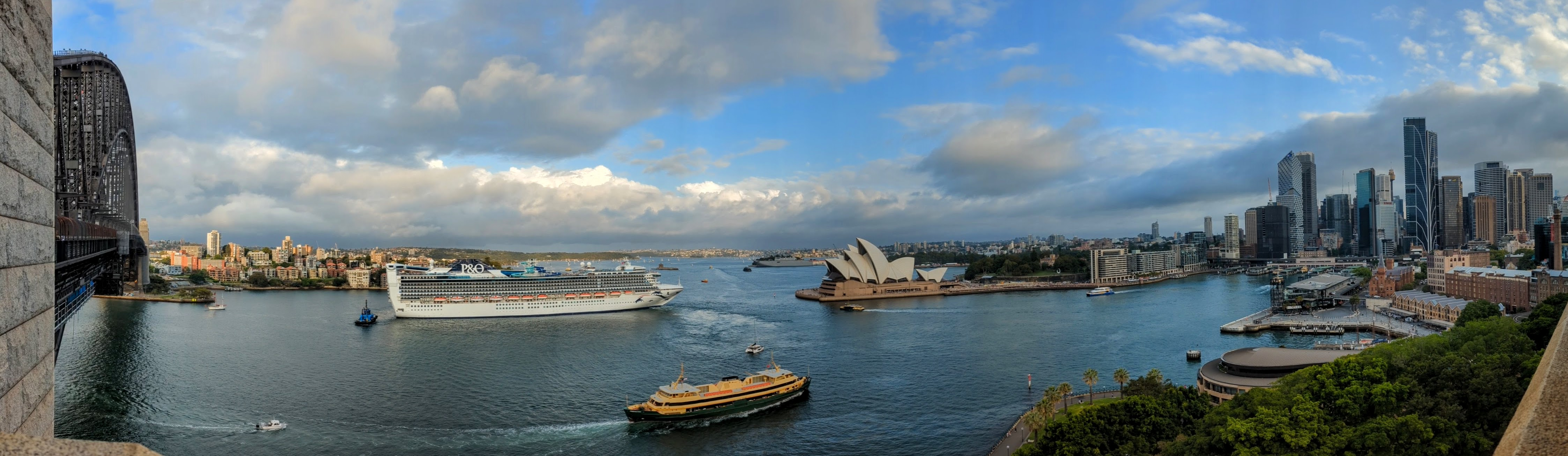
Pacific Adventure backing out of Circular Quay in Sydney on 27 January 2023

Golden Princess transitioned into P&O's fleet in 2022 as Pacific Adventure, her guest capacity has been increased to 2,636, with modifications including the addition of five-berth cabins. P&O also invited the public to contribute suggestions in order to design a more family-oriented experience on the ship. New features added consisted of a new adults-only lounge space and a recreational park. Renovations were completed in Trieste in fall 2021.

On 28 May 2023, at approximately 3:30AM, while off the east coast of Australia on a three-day cruise from Sydney a fire broke out on a passenger balcony on the port side of the ship. All passengers were mustered and the fire was extinguished. This incident was the second balcony fire to occur on a Grand-class cruise ship. Pacific Adventure's sister ship Pacific Encounter (then known as Star Princess) experienced a balcony fire in 2006 resulting in significant damage and the death of a passenger.

On 6 May 2024, a passenger on Pacific Adventure was reported to have gone overboard just after 4:00AM about 10 nautical miles (19 km; 12 mi) off Sydney Heads. The ship's arrival into Sydney was delayed while the area was searched. Four helicopters, including the Police Airwing and two Westpac helicopters were involved in the search, as was another ship Carnival Splendor. A body was later retrieved from the water.

In June 2024, Carnival Corp. announced P&O Cruises Australia would be closed and absorbed into Carnival Cruise Line from March 2025, impacting all ships of the P&O fleet.

=== Carnival Adventure ===
Pacific Adventure was rebranded into Carnival Adventure in March 2025, following the closure of the P&O Cruises Australia brand. The ship received bespoke Carnival branding, including a Carnival brand-mark on its funnel, breaking from tradition. Internally, some areas received branded updates while technology upgrades were completed in order to support Carnival's hub app. The ship continues to operate out of Sydney year round alongside Carnival Splendor, although Carnival Adventure will operate out of Melbourne for one month in 2027.

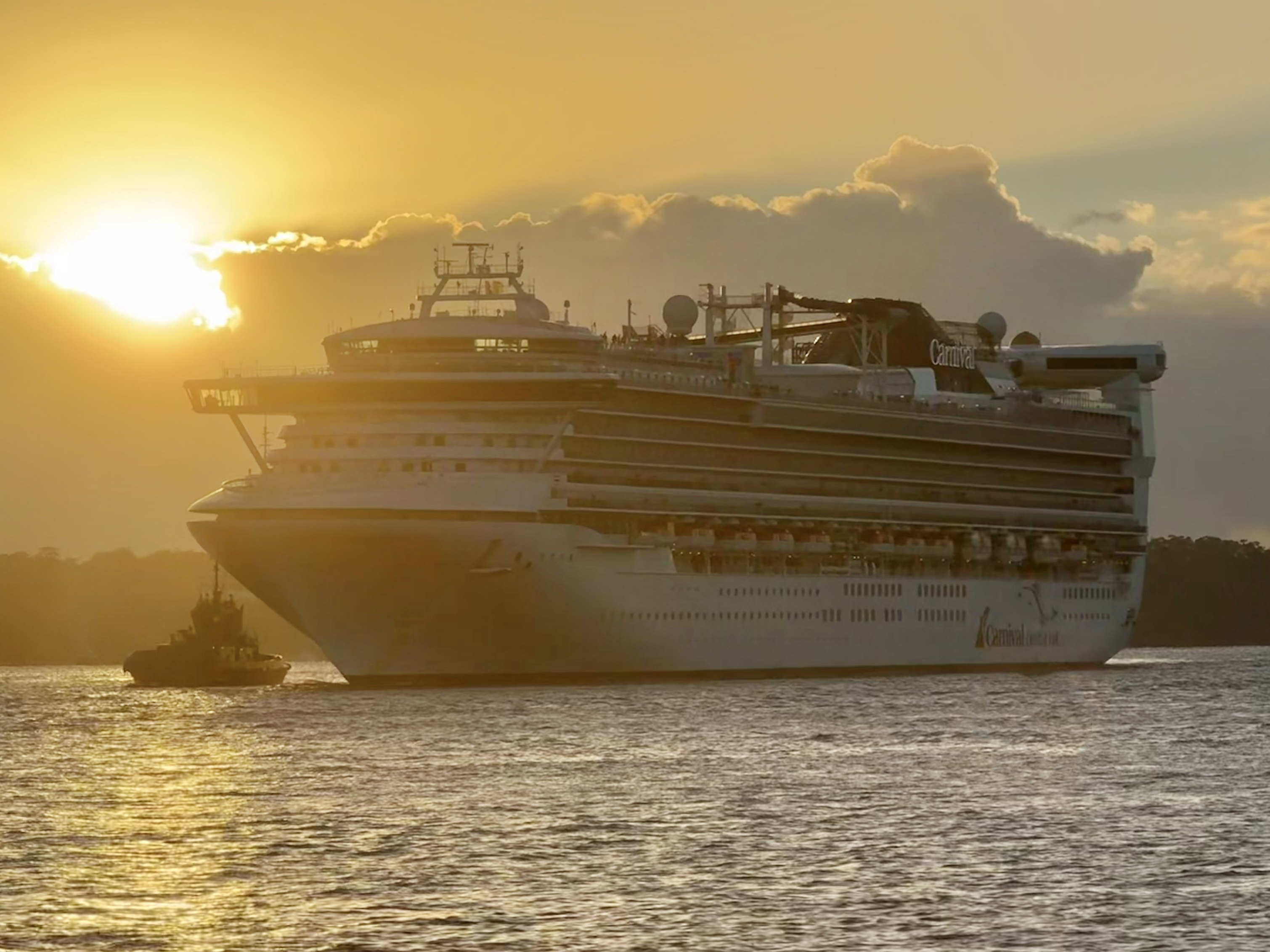
Carnival Adventure sailing into Sydney Harbour on 20 April 2026

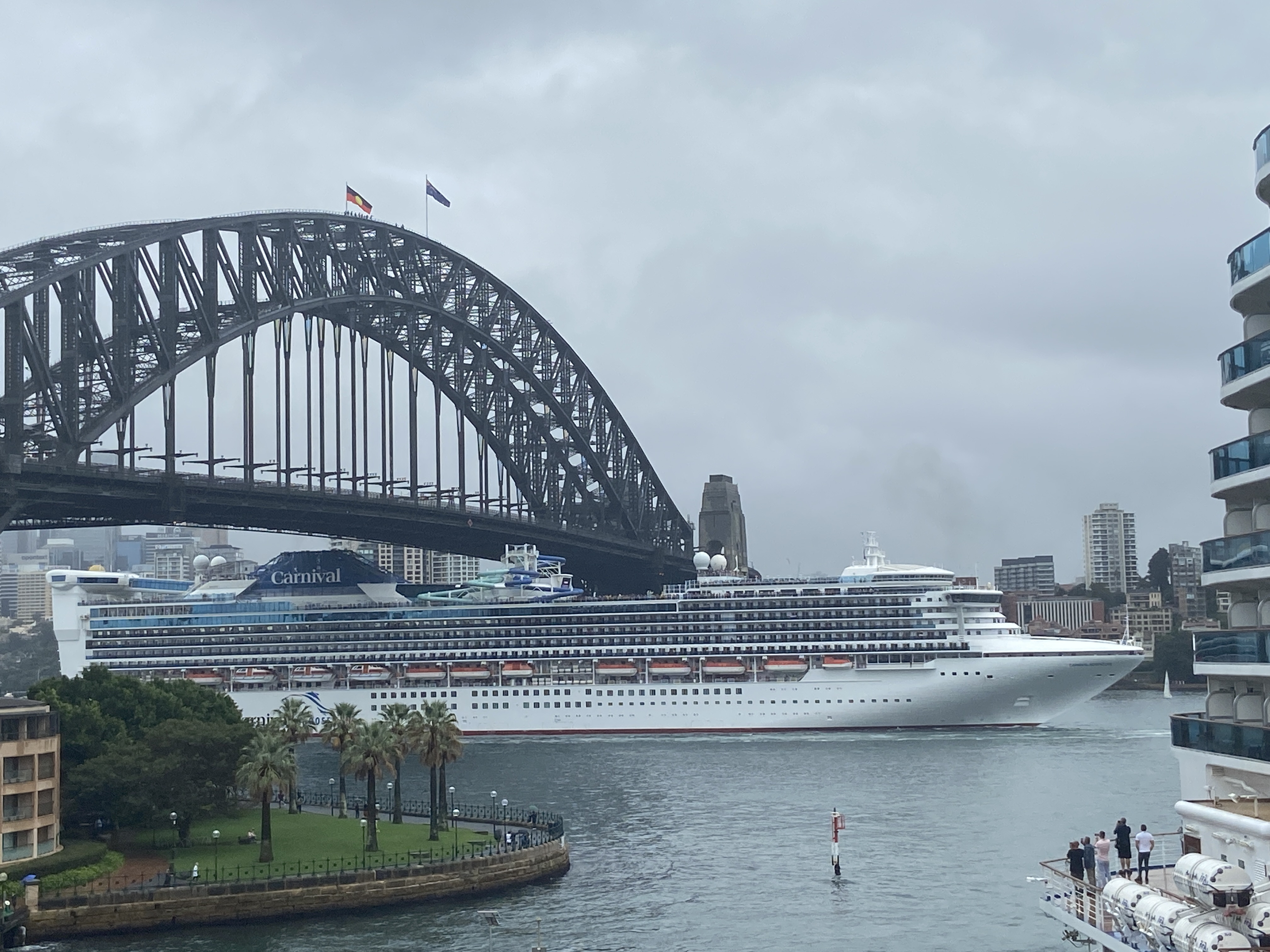
Carnival Adventure goes under the Sydney Harbour Bridge and making her Maiden Carnival Departure in Sydney, Australia on 29 March 2025, while she's too close to passing with Royal Princess
