= Eastern Steamship Line (1965) =

Cruise line

The Eastern Steamship Line (later Eastern Cruise Line), was a cruise line operating second hand ships on short Bahamas and Caribbean cruises from the 1960s to the late 1980s. The name was a revival from the famed original Eastern Steamship Lines that sailed the eastern seaboard in the early to mid twentieth century.

== History ==
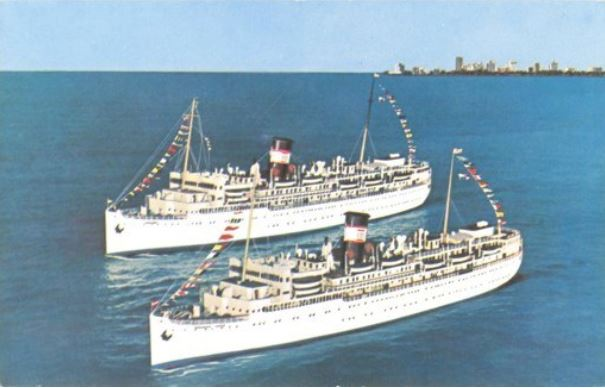
SS Evangeline and SS Yarmouth Castle

In 1954 Frank L. Fraser purchased the two final ships of the original Eastern Steamship Lines, Yarmouth (Queen of Nassau, and later renamed Yarmouth Castle) and Evangeline both for what's then known as the Eastern Shipping Corporation. In 1958 the Yarmouth sailed to Yarmouth, Nova Scotia, for one last summer season, going on government subsidies. They would be joined by the SS Bahama Star in 1959, and SS Ariadne in November 1960. In May 1961, owner Frank L. Fraser had passed full control of the company to William R. Lovett (of Winn-Dixie supermarkets), with the name being changed to Eastern Steamship Corporation.

In 1963, the original Eastern ships would eventually be sold off. The Yarmouth Castle would go to the Chadade Steamship Company, which formed a new subsidiary line, Yarmouth Cruise Line, and the Evangeline sold to Caribbean Cruise Line.

In 1965, Eastern's owner Lovett would rename the company Eastern Steamship Line, reviving the former Eastern Steamship Lines company name. In 1968 the line acquired the even larger Miami from the Peninsular & Occidental Steamship Co and renamed her New Bahama Star. In 1970 The Eastern Steamship Line was bought out by Gotass Larsen, who was one of the owners of the new Royal Caribbean Cruise Line. In 1972 the Ariadne would be sold, and replaced with the larger TSS Emerald Seas, which was purchased from Chandris Line as the Atlantis. In 1981 the company was renamed again to the more modern Eastern Cruise Line.

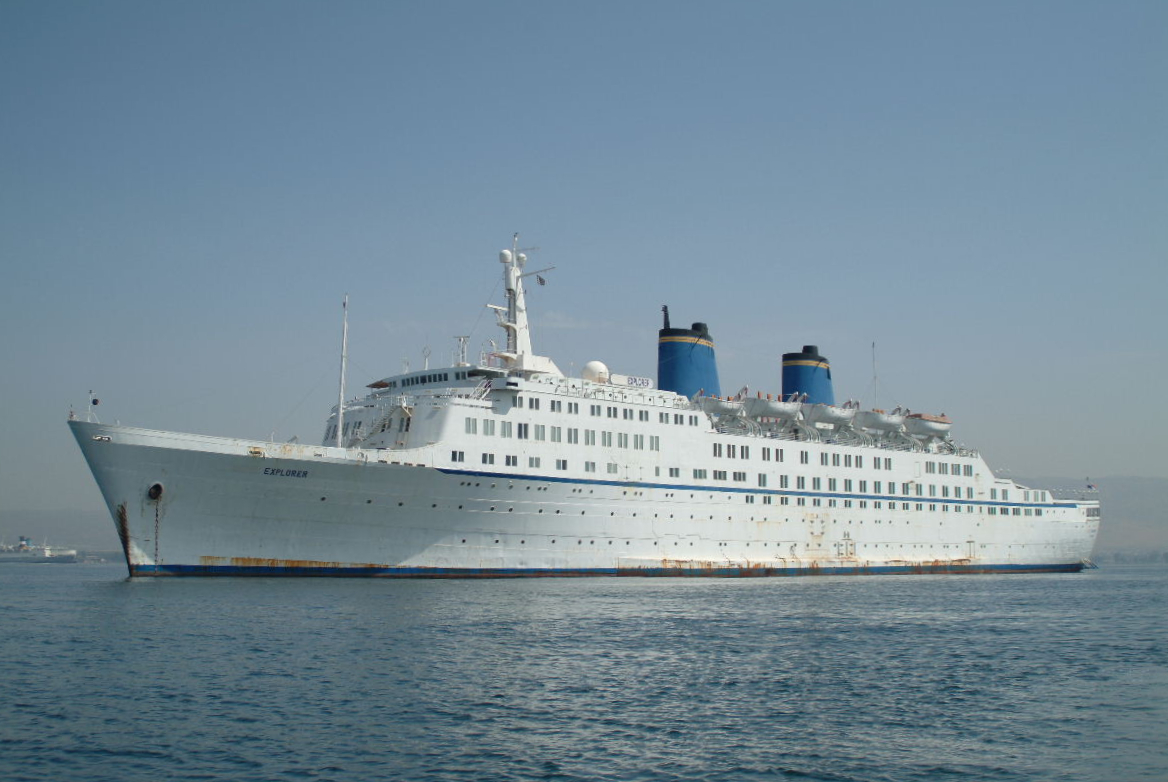
The former Emerald Seas

=== Merger ===
In 1986, Eastern Cruise Line was merged along with Western Cruise Lines and Sundance Cruises to form Admiral Cruises. The line would later be dissolved by partner line Royal Caribbean Cruise Line in 1991, with most of the ships sold off, and the first planned new build, Future Seas, being transferred to Royal Caribbean as the Nordic Empress, the last legacy of the Eastern Steamship Lines.

== Fleet List ==
- SS Bahamas Star
- SS Ariadne
- SS New Bahama Star
- TSS Emerald Seas
