= List of ship decommissionings in 1987 =

The list of ship decommissionings in 1987 includes a chronological list of all ships decommissioned in 1987.

	Operator	Ship	Flag	Class and type	Fate	Other notes
1 January	Royal Navy	Galatea		Leander-class frigate	Scrapped	
1 January	Finnlines	Finnjet	Finland	cruiseferry	Transferred to Effoa (Silja Line)	Finnlines remained technical managers until 1989
March	Lion Ferry	Europafärjan II	Sweden	Ferry	Renamed Lion Princess	Continued on same traffic
30 April	Royal Navy	Aurora		Leander-class frigate	Sunk as target	
April	Polferries	Rogalin	Poland	Ferry	Chartered to Swansea-Cork Ferries	Renamed Celtic Pride
April	Club Sea	Club Sea	Antigua and Barbuda	Cruise ship	End of charter, returned to Sea Containers	Renamed Orient Express
June	Royal Navy	Fife		County-class destroyer	Sold to Chile	Renamed Blanco Encalada (D15)
October	Rederi Ab Sally	Viking Sally	Finland	Cruiseferry	Chartered to Rederi AB Slite	Continued in Viking Line traffic.
Date uncertain	Royal Navy	Leander		Leander-class frigate	Sunk as target	
Date uncertain	Royal Navy	Naiad		Leander-class frigate	Sunk as target	
Date uncertain	Sundance Cruises	Stardancer	Bahamas	Cruiseferry	Transferred to Admiral Cruises	

== Bibliography ==
- Friedman, Norman (2006). British Destroyers and Frigates, the Second World War and After. Annapolis, Maryland: Naval Institute Press. ISBN 1-86176-137-6.
