= Carnival Encounter =

Cruise ship

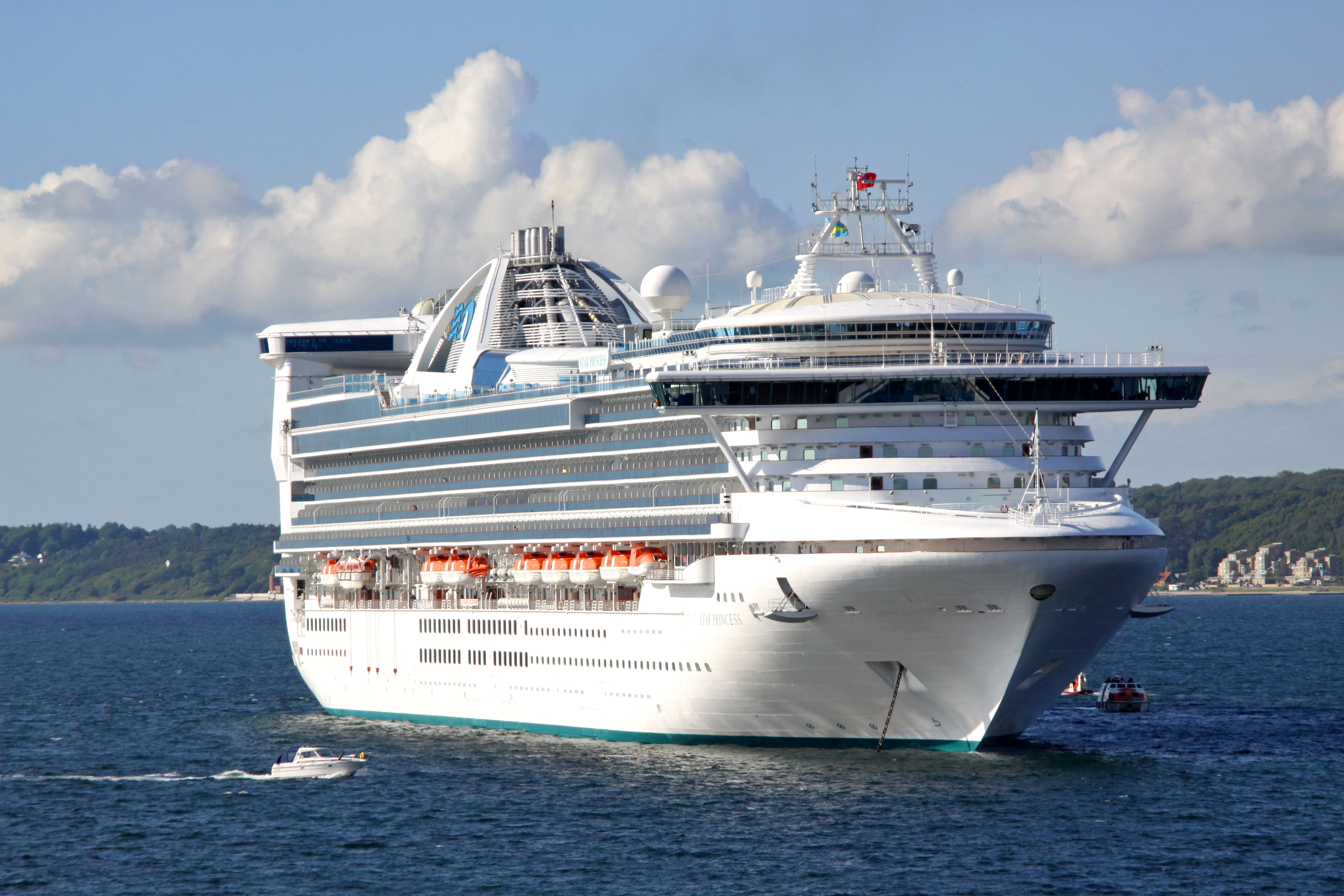
- Carnival Encounter as Star Princess was anchored besides with two cities Helsingør in Denmark and Helsingborg in Sweden on June 20, 2010

History

Bahamas
- Name: 2002–2021: Star Princess; 2021–2025: Pacific Encounter; 2025-present: Carnival Encounter
- Owner: Carnival Corporation & plc
- Operator: 2002–2021: Princess Cruises; 2021–2025: P&O Cruises Australia; 2025-present: Carnival Cruise Line
- Port of registry: 2002–2021: Hamilton, Bermuda; 2021–2025: London, United Kingdom; 2025–present: Nassau, Bahamas
- Ordered: January 1998
- Builder: Fincantieri; Monfalcone, Italy
- Cost: US$425 million
- Yard number: 6051
- Launched: 10 May 2001
- Sponsored by: Gunilla Antonini
- Christened: 25 January 2002
- Completed: 25 January 2002
- Maiden voyage: 10 March 2002 (Star Princess); August 2022 (Pacific Encounter); 29 March 2025 (Carnival Encounter)
- In service: 2002–present
- Home port: Brisbane, Australia
- Identification: Call sign: ZCDD6; IMO number: 9192363; MMSI number: 310361000
- Status: In service

General characteristics
- Class & type: Grand-class cruise ship
- Tonnage: 109,000 GT; 73,347 NT; 10,852 DWT
- Length: 290 m (951 ft 5 in)
- Beam: 36 m (118 ft 1 in)
- Draught: 8.05 m (26 ft 5 in)
- Speed: 23 knots (43 km/h; 26 mph) (maximum)
- Capacity: 2,600 passengers
- Crew: 1,100

Carnival Encounter is a Grand-class cruise ship operated by Carnival Cruise Line. She was originally delivered in 2002 as Star Princess to sister cruise line Princess Cruises in 2002 by Italian shipbuilder Fincantieri, and was the second ship in Princess' history to operate under the name. She had been the third Grand-class ship to be added to the fleet, following Grand Princess and Golden Princess. In 2018, Carnival Corporation announced that Star Princess would be transferred to P&O Cruises Australia to accommodate P&O's expansion plans in Oceania; however, amid the COVID-19 pandemic and its subsequent impact on tourism, Carnival Corporation accelerated the transfer of the vessel and Star Princess joined P&O's fleet in 2020, one year earlier than planned. Following a renovation and a renaming to Pacific Encounter, she debuted in August 2022 upon P&O's staged resumption of operations. As of March 2025, she has been transferred to Carnival Cruise Line under the name Carnival Encounter and will be sailing from Brisbane.

== Design specifications ==
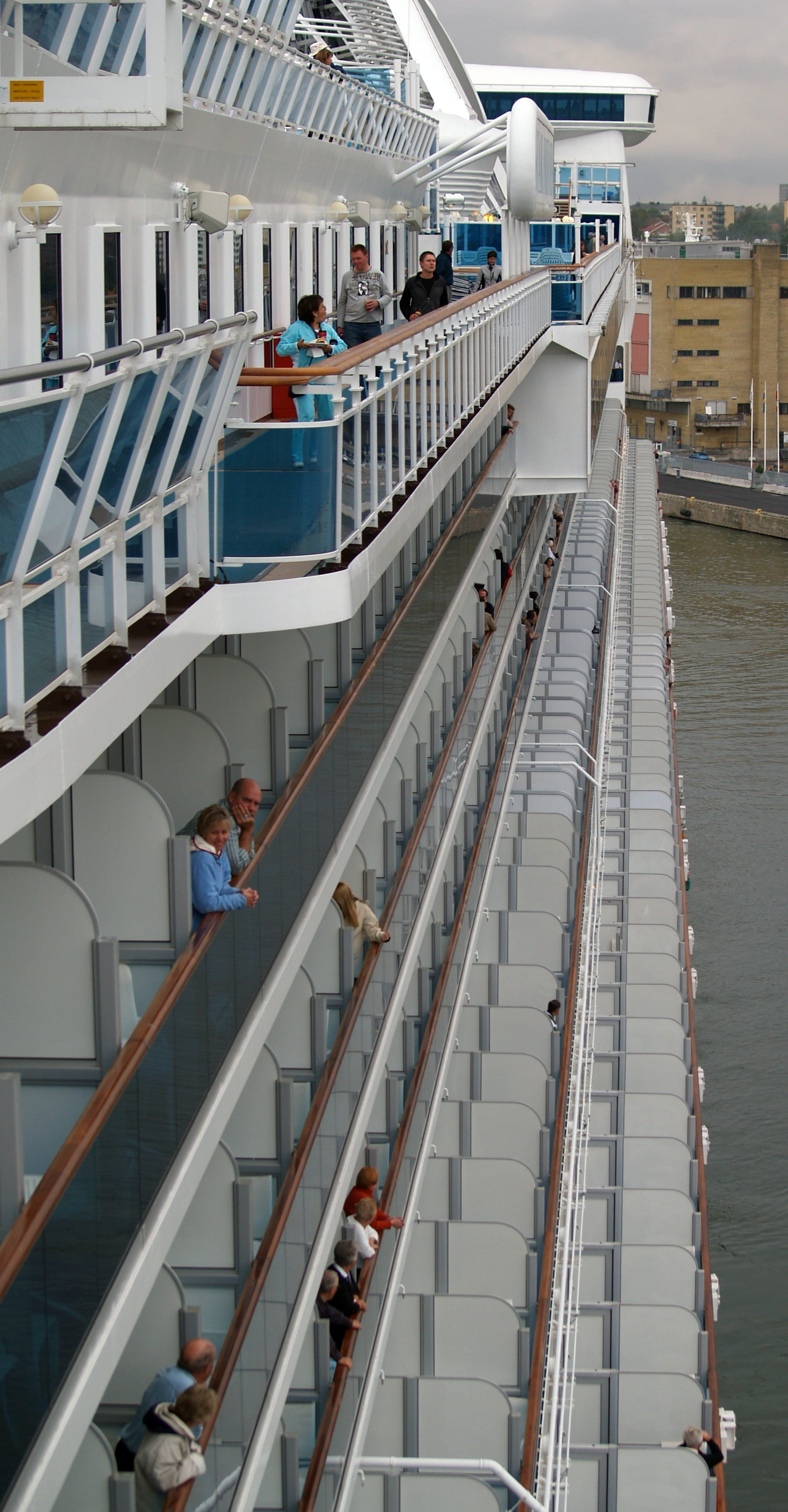
Balconies along the port side of Star Princess (pictured in 2009)

As Star Princess, the vessel measured 109,000 GT, had a length of 290.0 metres (951 ft 5 in), a draft of 8.05 metres (26 ft 5 in), and a beam of 36 metres (118 ft 1 in). She was powered by a diesel-electric genset system, with six Sulzer engines: four producing 11,520 kilowatts (15,450 hp) and two producing 8,640 kilowatts (11,590 hp). The system gave the vessel a maximum speed of 23 knots (43 km/h; 26 mph). The ship housed 1,299 passenger cabins and 627 crew cabins. Of the 1,780 passenger cabins, 72% had a view outside, including 55% that included a balcony. The ship had a maximum capacity of 4,160 passengers and crew.

== History ==
=== Star Princess ===
In January 1998, the then-unnamed ship was ordered as part of a two-ship order made by Princess with Fincantieri, with each ship costing US$425 million. The two 109,000 GT Grand-class ships were scheduled to be delivered in 2001, and slotted to sail in the Caribbean from Port Everglades year-round. Later, in October 2000, Princess announced Star Princess would instead be deployed to Los Angeles for Mexican Riviera cruises following her delivery, with Alaska itineraries during the summers. Star Princess became the first then-dubbed "mega-ship" ever to be homeported in Los Angeles and also cruise from the West Coast on a full-time basis.

Star Princess was launched on 10 May 2001 at Fincantieri's shipyard in Monfalcone, Italy. On 29 June 2001, a fire started in a galley on board when sparks from a welding torch ignited it. The fire spread into a dining room but damage was not extensive and construction continued until completion on 25 January 2002.

Star Princess was christened on 25 January 2002 at Fincantieri's Monfalcone shipyard by her godmother, Gunilla Antonini, wife of Fincantieri's executive chairman, Corrado Antonini.

At the time of her delivery to Princess Cruises, Star Princess was too large to make a Panama Canal transit, so to arrive in Los Angeles, she embarked on an eastward voyage from Italy, taking her through the Mediterranean, the Suez Canal, the Indian Ocean, and a 26-day inaugural voyage across the Pacific Ocean.

Star Princess' first homeport was Los Angeles and her maiden season featured itineraries to the Mexican Riviera, with her first cruise from Los Angeles, a 3-day cruise, held on 10 March 2002. She sailed to Alaska from Vancouver beginning mid-2003. In late 2003, she became the first vessel of more than 100,000 GT to sail in Australian waters after she arrived at Sydney on 26 November 2003. She moved to Southeast Asia in early 2004 before cruising the Mediterranean in mid-2004, the Caribbean in late 2004, and the Baltic in mid-2005. She made her first trip to South America and Antarctica in January 2008.

==== 2006 fire ====
On 23 March 2006, at approximately 3:00 am, while en route from Grand Cayman to Montego Bay, Jamaica, a fire broke out in the passenger compartments in the midship section on the port side of the ship. Shortly after, the captain sounded the general emergency signal—seven short blasts followed by one long blast on the ship's whistle over the public address system, horn, and various alarms. Passengers evacuated their cabins into public areas through smoky hallways, grabbing their life jackets on the way. They assembled at their muster stations and were combined into groups for about seven hours.

The evacuation was reportedly orderly, in contrast to deadlier fires such as those on Morro Castle, Yarmouth Castle and Scandinavian Star. Lifeboats were lowered but proved to be unnecessary, as the fire was contained and doused, and the ship headed into Montego Bay under her own power. The fire was allegedly caused by a cigarette left burning on a balcony, which had become hot enough to melt the balcony divides made from plastic polycarbonate, a material that had been approved by international cruise line safety rules. The fire caused scorching damage in up to 150 cabins, and smoke damage in at least 100 more on passenger decks 9 to 12 (Dolphin, Caribe, Baja and Aloha decks, respectively). One passenger died from "asphyxia secondary to inhalation of smoke and irrespirable gases" and thirteen other passengers suffered significant smoke inhalation.

The Marine Accident Investigation Branch (MAIB) of the United Kingdom investigated this incident on behalf of the Bermuda Maritime Administration; the ship was flagged as a Bermuda vessel. Two U.S. government agencies helped the MAIB; they were the National Transportation Safety Board (NTSB) and the U.S. Coast Guard.

While a smoldering discarded cigarette probably did cause the flames, the following items were also at fault for allowing the fire to spread as quickly as it did:

- The balconies' polycarbonate partitions, polyurethane deck tiles, and the plastic furniture were highly combustible and produced large quantities of very thick black smoke when burned.
- The glass in the doors between the staterooms and balconies was neither fire retardant, to meet with the requirements of an ‘A’ class division, nor self-closing.
- The balconies crossed main zone fire boundaries, both horizontally and vertically, and were without structural or thermal barriers at the zone or deck boundaries.
- No fire detection or fire suppression systems were fitted on the balconies.

==== Aftermath ====
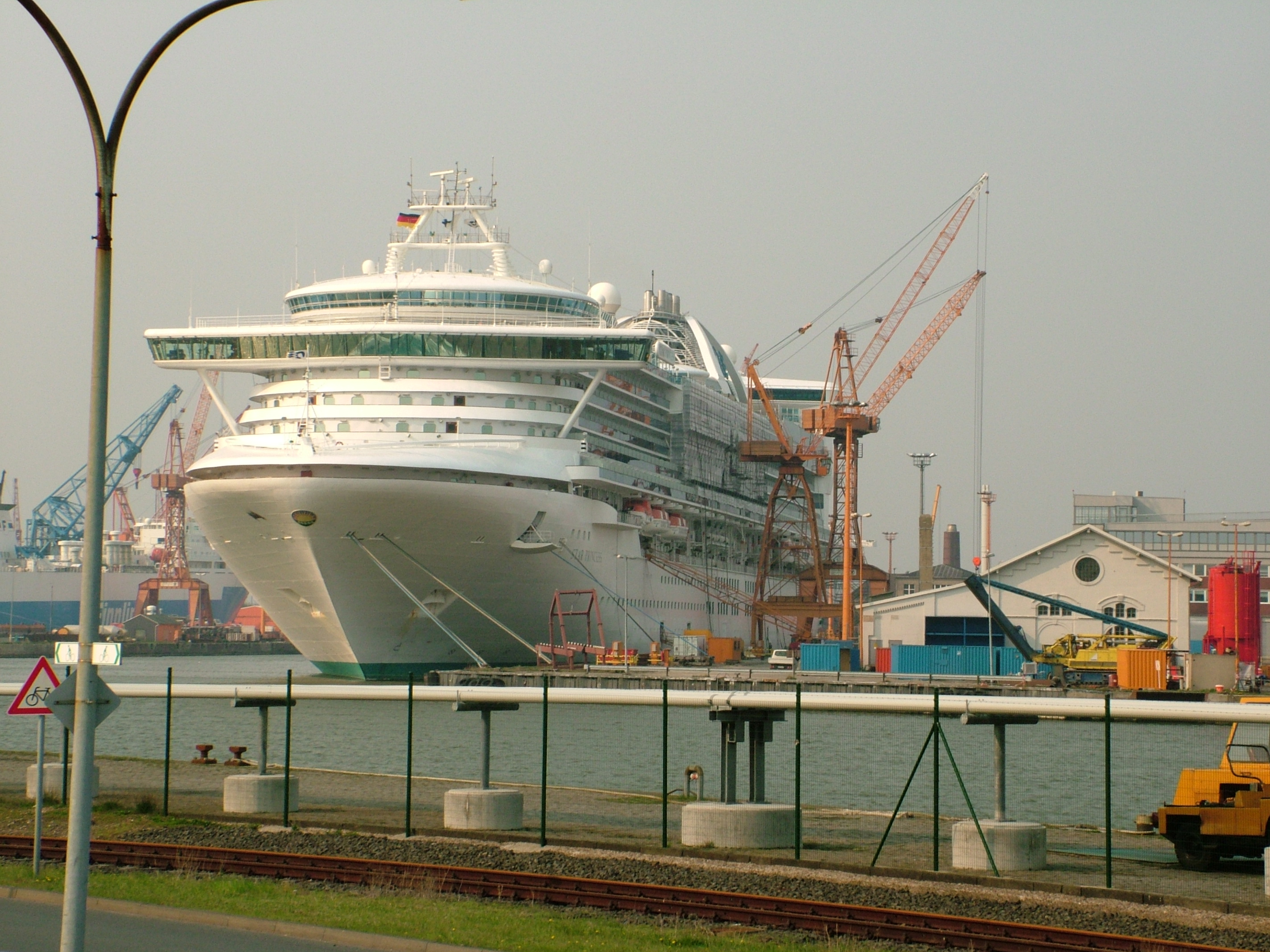
Star Princess receiving repairs at Bremerhaven after the fire, with scaffolding along her port side

The cruise was terminated in Montego Bay and passengers were evacuated to hotels in Jamaica and subsequently flew home. All passengers received a full refund and were reimbursed any out-of-pocket travel expenses they incurred. The ship had been on a Caribbean itinerary that departed from Port Everglades on 19 March 2006. With 79 cabins destroyed and a further 204 damaged, the ship was moved to the Bahamas where she was prepared for a transatlantic crossing to the Lloyd Werft shipyard in Bremerhaven, Germany, for repairs. Her remaining Caribbean cruises and a transatlantic cruise were cancelled, with the anticipation that she would begin her summer sailing season in the Baltic on 15 May.

The ship set sail again on 13 May 2006, and resumed her regular service on 15 May from Copenhagen. Princess implemented new measures that aim to prevent a disaster of similar proportion, which include enhanced procedures for handling fires and clear communication during emergencies. Passengers reported that the only noticeable differences were a strong smell of new carpeting, the addition of sprinklers to all balconies and the replacement of plastic furniture with non-combustible alternatives. No interior decor was significantly modified to maintain consistency of the ship's interior design. On 28 May 2023, a similar fire occurred on the vessel's sister ship Carnival Adventure.

On 10 March 2012, en route in the Pacific Ocean off the coast of South America, three passengers from Star Princess spotted a small boat drifting with waving seamen, apparently in distress, and notified the crew. However, Star Princess did not change course to investigate. On 19 March, the Ecuadorian coast guard rescued the Panamanian fishing boat Fifty Cent with one survivor on board. Subsequent communication between the survivor, a reporter, and the passengers who spotted the survivors led to allegations that the small boat sighted nine days prior was, in fact, Fifty Cent, and that Star Princess had failed to stop and render aid.

Princess first indicated that there had been a breakdown in communication and the captain had not been notified of the sighting. A later report stated that a crew member did, in fact, convey the passengers' concerns to the bridge, and that the ship's log for that time on 10 March contained an entry recording that the ship had deviated to the west to avoid the fishing nets, and that the fishermen had "signaled their thanks" for avoiding their nets.

By June 2012, two lawsuits were filed against Princess on behalf of the fishermen of Fifty Cent. In August 2012, Princess responded with the claim that Star Princess and Fifty Cent were never within sight of one another and thus, the accusations were the result of mistaken identity. As supporting evidence, the cruise line made public the results of a drift analysis and a photographic investigation they had commissioned. In April 2013, the Bermuda Department of Maritime Administration was reported to have closed their official inquiry into the incident. The Bermuda Police Service carried out the investigation. The Department of Public Prosecutors disclosed that the passengers who were material witnesses to the case made a statement that the boat they had seen from the cruise ship was ultimately not the same boat as the one recovered by the Ecuadorian coast guard.

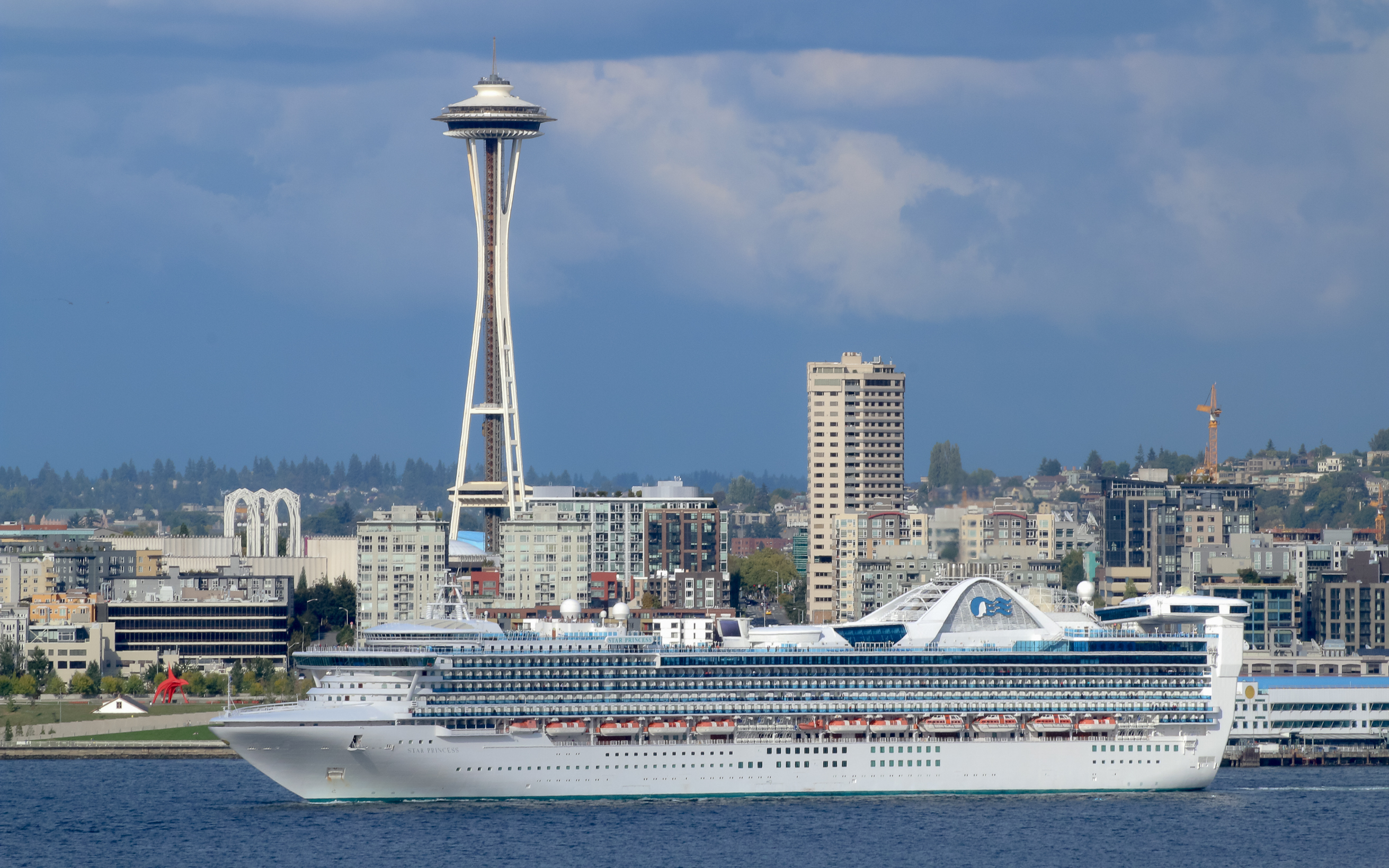
Star Princess departs Seattle, Washington, USA on September 24, 2013

For winter 2019–2020, she was homeported in Los Angeles and sailed itineraries to the Mexican Riviera, Sea of Cortez, and Hawaii. In mid 2020, she was scheduled to homeport in San Francisco for Alaska voyages. However, following Princess' suspension of operations due to the COVID-19 pandemic, all summer 2020 voyages were cancelled.

=== Pacific Encounter ===
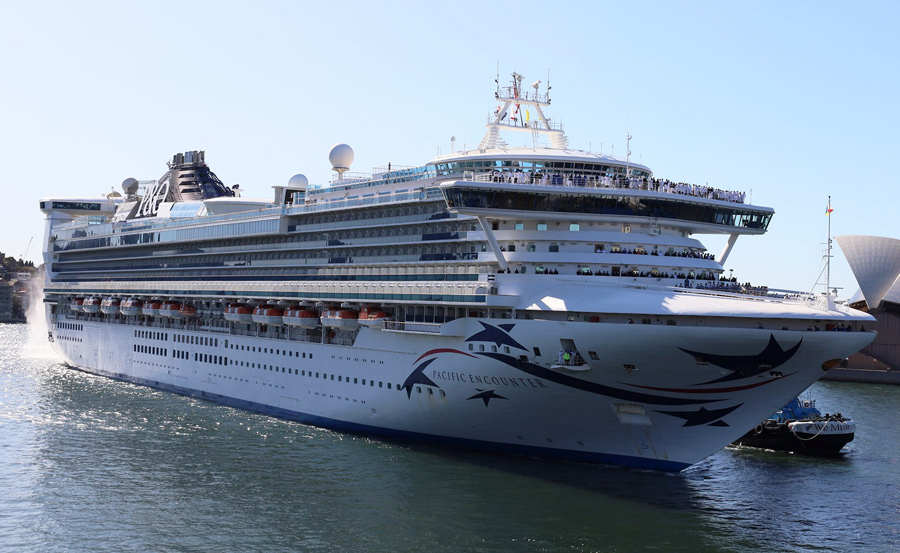
Pacific Encounter arriving in Sydney for the first time on August 2, 2022

In August 2018, Princess' sister brand, P&O Cruises Australia, announced that Star Princess would be transferred to the P&O fleet in late-2021, joining her sister ship, Golden Princess which was set to join P&O in October 2020. It also announced in November 2019 that she would be renamed Pacific Encounter upon joining its fleet. However, amid the COVID-19 pandemic, Carnival Corporation accelerated the transfer of Star Princess from Princess to P&O in October 2020, thus cancelling all final voyages she was originally scheduled to sail for Princess through 2021.

In January 2021, the ship entered the Sembcorp Marine shipyard in Singapore for a dry dock to redesign the vessel and modify the design language of the interior to align her with those of her sister ships. The work included exterior repainting and rebranding, as well as new interior outfitting and maintenance. Modifications also included redesigned lounge areas and venues, a revamped atrium, and new restaurants.

In December 2019, P&O announced that Pacific Encounter would homeport in Brisbane beginning in November 2021 and cruise to different destinations in Oceania, including the Queensland coast and Melanesia islands. As of December 2021, the ship was subject to P&O's resumption of operations, which commenced in March 2022.

In June 2024, Carnival Corporation announced P&O Cruises Australia would be closed and absorbed into Carnival Cruise Line from March 2025, impacting all ship's of the P&O fleet.

=== Carnival Encounter ===
After a two-week wet docking in Melbourne in March 2025, the newly rebranded Carnival Encounter continued sailing from Brisbane year round, supplemented by Carnival Luminosa during the busy summer season. She went to Singapore for dry dock maintenance from February to March of 2026, wearing Carnival’s New Livery.
