= USAHS Acadia =

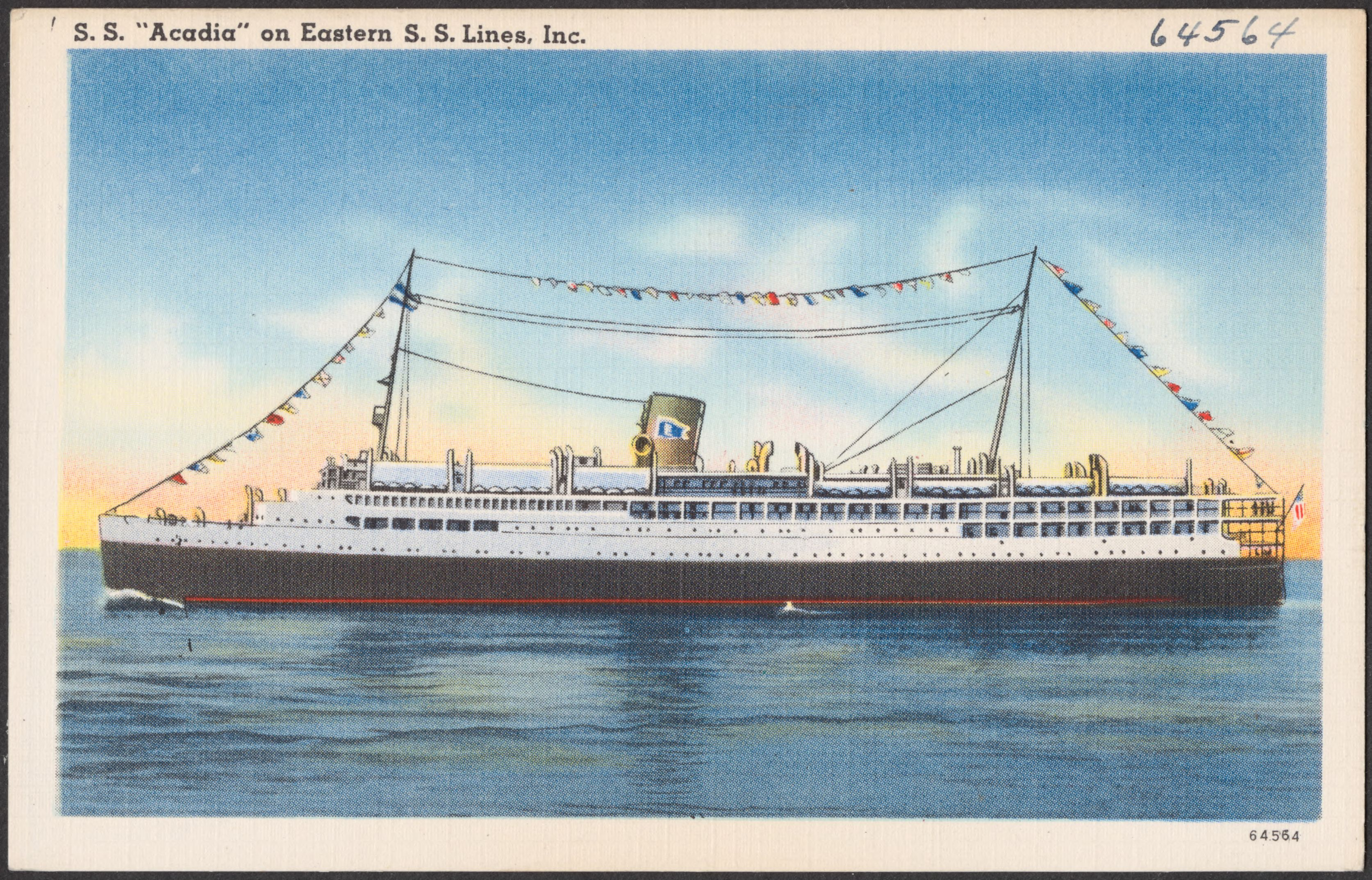
- Acadia in civilian service

History

United States
- Name: Acadia
- Owner: Eastern Steamship Lines
- Port of registry: Boston
- Builder: Newport News Shipbuilding, Newport News, Virginia
- Laid down: 31 August 1931
- Launched: 13 February 1932
- Completed: Delivered 7 June 1932
- Out of service: 8 October 1941
- Identification: US official number 231673; code letters MJRQ (until 1934); Call sign WHES (1934 onward)
- Fate: Chartered to US Maritime Commission 1941
- Notes: Newport News Shipbuilding hull #351; United States Official number: 231673

United States
- Name: USAT Acadia
- In service: 29 April 1942
- Fate: Converted to hospital ship 1943
- Notes: Troop transport and ambulance ship

United States
- Name: USAHS Acadia
- Decommissioned: 7 February 1946
- In service: 5 June 1943
- Out of service: 15 February 1947
- Fate: Returned to owners 1947, sold to Belgian buyers May, 1955
- Notes: Transport service 1946–47

General characteristics
- Displacement: 6,811
- Length: 402 ft 9 in (122.8 m) o/a; 387.4 ft (118.1 m) registered
- Beam: 61.2 ft (18.7 m)
- Depth: 29.0 ft (8.8 m)
- Decks: 3
- Propulsion: 2 × screws; 2 × steam turbines
- Speed: 16 knots (30 km/h)
- Sensors & processing systems: By 1936: gyrocompass; echo sounding device

USAHS Acadia was the first United States Army Hospital Ship in World War II. Built in 1932 by Newport News Shipbuilding as a civilian passenger/cargo ocean liner for the Eastern Steamship Lines, the ship was in US coastal and Caribbean service prior to its acquisition by the US Maritime Administration in 1941.

== Eastern Steamship Lines service ==
SS Acadia, along with her sister ship the St. John, entered US coastal service for the Eastern Steamship Lines in 1932, originally in New York-Yarmouth coastal service with some one way passages for New York-Yarmouth-Halifax or Saint John. From 1938 to 1940 the ship's route was shifted to New York-Bermuda or Nassau service. Both ships were designed by Theodore E. Ferris. In 1939, the ship was chartered to United States Lines for one voyage in order to return American citizens from Europe. In 1941 the ship was being operated by the Alcoa Steamship Company in a route from New York to St. Thomas, Antigua, Trinidad and return by way of Grenada, St. Vincent, St. Lucia, Dominica, St. Croix, St. Thomas.

== US Army service ==
On 8 October 1941, the United States Maritime Commission took control of Acadia from Alcoa Steamship Company in New York and for allocation to and charter by the Army Transport Service, then under the Quartermaster Corps, with operation by commercial shipping company agents. The ship was operated briefly by American West African Lines until restored to Alcoa operation on 23 November and operation by the line until returned to Eastern Steamship operation 29 April 1942 in New Orleans where control and the agreement was changed by the newly established War Shipping Administration (WSA) which now controlled and allocated all ocean going commercial type vessels. During the early part of 1942 Acadia was used to transport diplomats from South American countries and transporting German, Japanese and Italians from South America to internment in the United States.

=== Troop transport and ambulance ship ===
On 16 October 1942, at Boston, WSA allocated Acadia to the War Department on a bareboat basis for operation under the newly established Transportation Corps under which ships could be used as troop transports and ambulance ships for evacuation of wounded. During May 1942 Acadia was withdrawn from ordinary transport service and outfitted at the Boston Port of Embarkation for such a combined function with a troop capacity of 1,100 troops to overseas destinations and 530 patients on the return voyage; making the first voyage as such in December 1942.

Private Martin Lipschultz, member of the ship's 204th Medical Hospital Ship Company, described the arrangements:

"The Acadia was the first combined troop-transport-hospital ship to sail from the United States in World War II with a full hospital complement aboard. The 204th Medical Hospital Ship Company consisted of 18 Officers, 37 Nurses, and 94 Enlisted Men (it was activated April 1943). At the time of its first trip the German U-Boat menace was far from gone, and the Acadia with her precious cargo of troops, would have been a fine target for any enemy torpedo...

"The first voyage ended at Casablanca, French Morocco… For the next 4 months the Acadia would be crossing between North Africa and New York, carrying troops on the outbound trip and wounded patients on the return voyage..."

=== Hospital ship ===
In the early days of the war the Army had requested hospital ships but both the Bureau of the Budget and Maritime Commission had declined the request and noted such ships were properly the Navy's responsibility. When the Army renewed the request the administrator of the Maritime Commission, who also served as head of the War Shipping Administration, required the Army and Navy to agree on the strategic requirements for such ships before any allocation would be made. The Army had decided on the dual troop transport ambulance ship solution until events forced a change to Hague Convention protected hospital ships. One such event was the refusal of both the North African and European Theater commands to load helpless, non ambulatory, patients aboard unprotected ships subject to attack. There was also evidence that the Germans, Italians and Japanese were respecting hospital ship status.

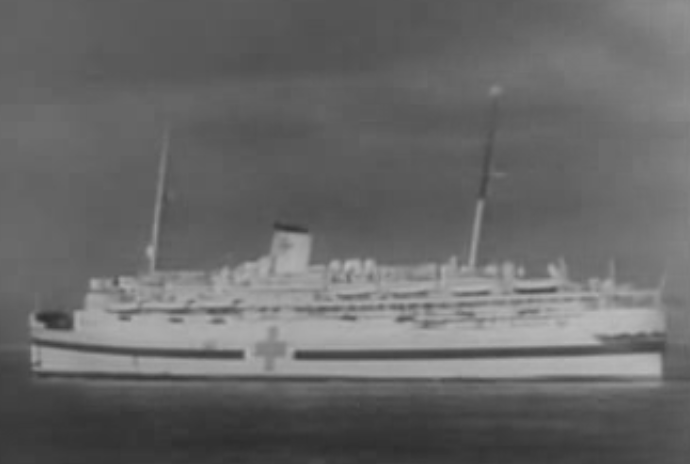
Acadia as a hospital ship in the Italian Campaign in 1943

On 30 March 1943, the Army's Surgeon General recommended Acadia be immediately registered as a hospital ship under the convention due to the urgency of the North African situation. On 6 May the State Department was notified of the designation and Acadia, not needing extensive conversion due to the previous ambulance ship role and requiring mainly new paint and markings. The quick conversion of Acadia is described by Private Martin Lipschultz:

"Then followed a short break with layover in New York harbor, while the ship exchanged her gray war paint coat for a white and green one. The anti-aircraft and other guns, the Navy crew, and the troopship bunks all went off, and after being duly registered under the Treaties of The Hague Convention, the new United States Army Hospital Ship Acadia was ready to sail once more."

In June 1943 the Joint Chiefs of Staff had agreed that hospital ships would be the "normal means" of transporting helpless patients. Earlier, in April, Army officials had decided on a fundamental difference between the function of Army hospital ships and Navy hospital ships in which the Army ships' medical facilities would be equipped only for emergency treatment of patients being transported between rear area hospitals or overseas to the United States and not the primary diagnosis and treatment of battle casualties as were the Navy's ships. The Charleston Port of Embarkation had been selected as the "home port" for Atlantic hospital ships in 1943 and, after embarking medical staff, supplies and issuing the identification required by the convention for all ship's personnel, Acadia sailed from Charleston on 5 June 1943, for North Africa as the first United States Army Hospital Ship Acadia. (Note: Smith on page 404 has "New York" but Protzman's more detailed account clearly has preparations for sailing to North Africa taking place at the Charleston Port of Embarkation which had been selected as the center for Atlantic hospital ship operations. The confusion may have been caused by the fact that Charleston POE had been a sub-port of the New York Port of Embarkation early in the war until elevated to full POE status.)

Acadia, with a capacity for 788 patients and three surgical teams had no water ambulances was the larger of two hospital ships evacuating U.S. wounded from North Africa, but was too large to dock at Bizerte. (Note: Wiltse has capacity of 806 on page 206 in connection with the North African period while 788 is given in connection with the Sicily evacuations on page 397. Since the first evacuation from Africa is stated as 788 (Bykofsky, page 178) that seems the likely capacity.) On the first evacuation in June 1943 the hospital ship lifted 788 patients from Oran to the United States. The general shortage of ships meant that only three Army hospital ships, USAHS Seminole and USAHS Shamrock along with Acadia, were available in theater by the end of 1943 so that only 3,593 patients were evacuated to the United States by hospital ship as opposed to 16,284 by troop ship.

During the Italian Campaign, though the ship did get to Italy, Acadia and Seminole were mainly used to transport patients from North African rear area hospitals to the United States while Shamrock was the only Army hospital ship normally engaged in transporting patients from Italy to North Africa. With the landings in Normandy patients were evacuated to the United Kingdom and Acadia was diverted to the Mediterranean theater. The hospital ship made a brief appearance in the Pacific in 1945.

== Post-War service ==
On 7 February 1946, she was decommissioned as a hospital ship and converted for the carriage of dependants of service personnel and troops returning to the United States. This transport service continued until 15 February 1947, when Acadia was placed under a WSA general agreement for operation by Eastern Steamship Lines until released from wartime service and coming under the line's full control on 23 July 1947.

Under the agreements in place at that time between US ship owners and the Maritime Administration, the US government was to restore a vessel to its pre-war condition or reimburse the owner for necessary repairs. The government chose the second option but Eastern Steamship had no work done after 23 July 1947, when the line regained full control and the court found no record of such work. Eastern Steamship filed suit claiming $5,000,000 to restore the ship under the Shipping Act of 1916 on 20 May 1948, which applied the ships "employed solely as merchant vessels," as necessary to recondition the ship for commercial passenger and cargo service. The company claimed the ship became a commercial ship on 15 February 1947, when placed in control as agent pending delivery back to the company on 23 July. The court determined the ship was not in commercial service but was a public vessel under the "bareboat requisition charter" with the appeals court upholding the lower court's finding the act did not apply and dismissal of the suit.

The ship remained out of service during the litigation and appeal process and was eventually sold to Belgian buyers in May 1955.

== Bibliography ==
- Bykofsky, Joseph; Larson, Harold (1990). The Technical Services—The Transportation Corps: Operations Overseas. United States Army In World War II. Washington, DC: Center Of Military History, United States Army. LCCN 56060000.
- Colton, T. (2 May 2014). "Newport News Shipbuilding, Newport News VA". Shipbuilding History. T. Colton. Archived from the original on 26 October 2014.
- Lloyd's Register of Shipping. London: Lloyd's Register of Shipping. 1933. ABS–ACH – via Internet Archive.
- Lloyd's Register of Shipping. London: Lloyd's Register of Shipping. 1936. ACA–ACH – via Internet Archive.
- Larsson, Björn (15 November 2009). "Alcoa Steamship Co". Maritime Timetable Images. Björn Larsson.
- Maritime Administration. "Acadia". Ship History Database Vessel Status Card. U.S. Department of Transportation, Maritime Administration.
- Masterson, Dr. James R. (1949). U. S. Army Transportation In The Southwest Pacific Area 1941–1947. Washington, D. C.: Transportation Unit, Historical Division, Special Staff, U. S. Army.
- Miyake, Lika C. (2002). "Forsaken and Forgotten: The U.S. Internment of Japanese Peruvians During World War II". Asian American Law Journal. 9 (January 2002).
- "New Coastwise Liner". Pacific Marine Review. 29 (June 1932). San Francisco: J.S. Hines: 218–219. 1932.
- "Newport News Shipbuilding & Drydock Company". Pacific Marine Review. 29 (July 1932). San Francisco: J.S. Hines: 281. 1932.
- Protzman, Thomas B. "Timeline USAHS Acadia". WW2 US Medical Research Centre (private venture).
- Roosevelt, Franklin D. (7 February 1942). "Executive Order No. 9054".
- Smith, Clarence McKittrick (1956). The Technical Services—The Medical Department: Hospitalization And Evacuation, Zone Of Interior. United States Army In World War II. Washington, DC: Center Of Military History, United States Army. LCCN 55060005.
- Wardlow, Chester (1956). The Technical Services—The Transportation Corps: Movements, Training, And Supply. United States Army In World War II. Washington, DC: Center Of Military History, United States Army. LCCN 55060003.
- Wiltse, Charles M. (1965). The Technical Services—The Medical Department: Medical Service In The Mediterranean and Minor Theaters. United States Army In World War II. Washington, DC: Center Of Military History, United States Army. LCCN 64060004.
