= Admiral Cruises =

Cruise line

- Type: Cruise Line
- Founded: 1986
- Defunct: 1992
- Fate: Dissolved
- Headquarters: Miami, Florida, United States
- Parent: Royal Caribbean Cruise Lines 1988-1992

Admiral Cruises was a cruise line that operated cruises on the Eastern and Western coasts of the United States. It was formed in 1986 as a merger of three small cruise lines and was acquired by Royal Caribbean Cruise Line in 1988. The brand was discontinued in 1992 and its ships were retired and sold.

== History ==
In 1986, Admiral Cruises was formed as a merger of three small cruise lines: Eastern Cruise Lines, Western Cruise Lines, and Sundance Cruise Lines. Each line only operated one ship. At its peak, it had a fleet of three ships, the Azure Seas, the Emerald Seas, and the Stardancer. In 1988, the cruise line announced it had ordered a new cruise ship called the Future Seas. Admiral Cruises merged with Royal Caribbean Cruise Lines in 1988. Shortly after the merger, the order for the Future Seas was transferred to Royal Caribbean and became the Nordic Empress when it was completed in 1990. In 1990, the Stardancer was transferred to Royal Caribbean becoming the Viking Serenade. In late 1991, Royal Caribbean decided to end the brand. The Azure Seas and the Emerald Seas were retired and sold off between 1991 and 1992.

== Fleet ==
Ship	Built	Entered service with Admiral Cruises	Tonnage	Notes	Image
Azure Seas	1955	1986–1992	20,204 GRT	Acquired from the merger of Western Cruise Lines. Sold to Dolphin Cruise Line in 1992. Later sold for scrap In 2003.	
Emerald Seas	1944	1986-1992	24,458 GRT	Acquired from the merger of Eastern Cruise Lines. Sold off in 1992. Later sold for scrap in 2004.	
Stardancer	1982	1986-1990	26,747 GRT	Acquired from the merger of Sundance Cruise Lines. Transferred to Royal Caribbean Cruise Lines in 1990 and became the Viking Serenade. Later sold for scrap in 2018.	
Future Seas	1990	Never operated for Admiral Cruises	48,563 GRT	Ordered by Admiral Cruises in 1988. Transferred to Royal Caribbean Cruise Lines to become the Nordic Empress. Later became the Empress of the Seas. Sold to Cordelia Cruises in 2020 and is currently in service as the Empress..	

== See also ==
- Royal Caribbean Cruises Ltd.
