= USS Antaeus =

Tender of the United States Navy

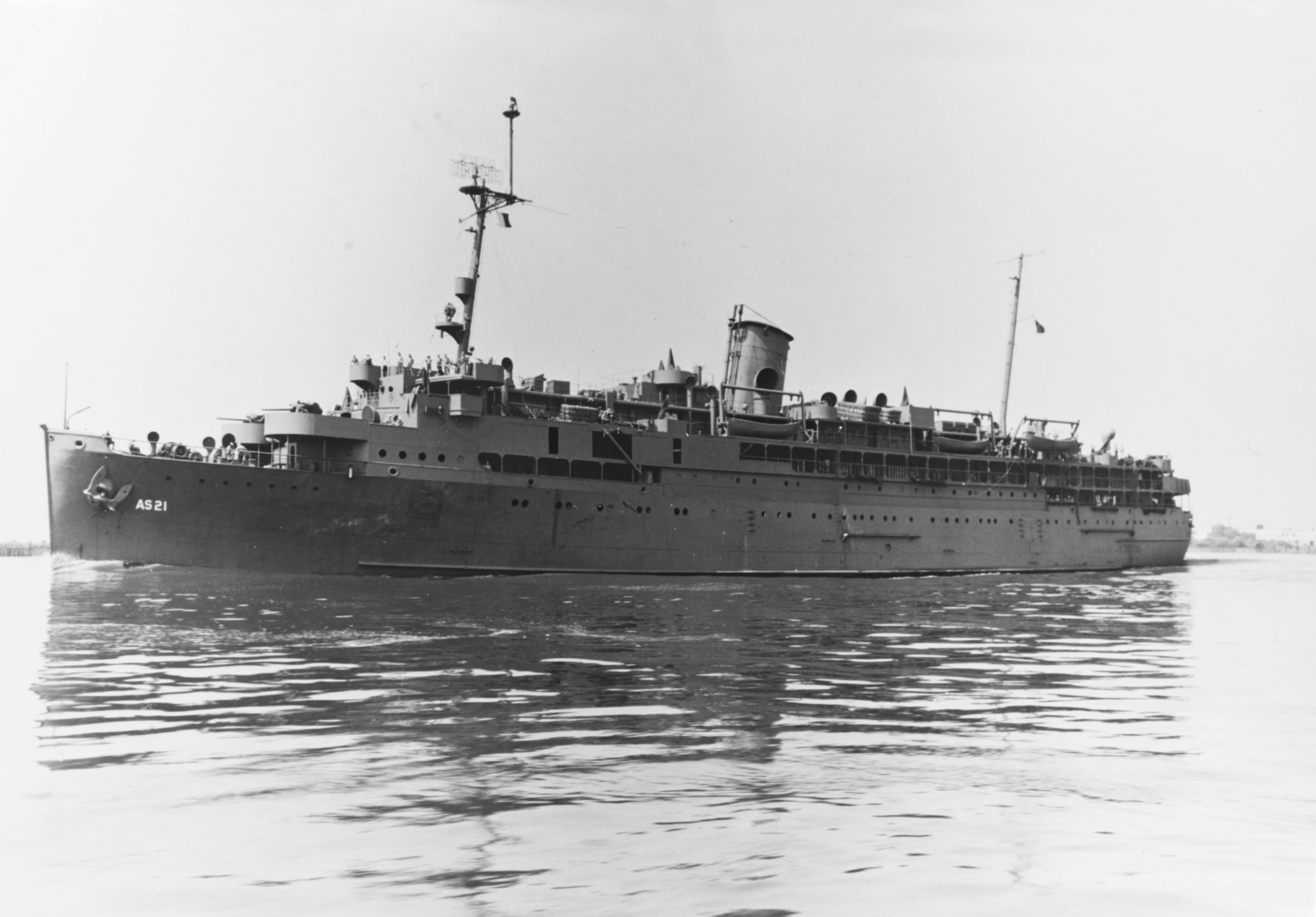
- Antaeus (AS-21) on June 25, 1943

History

United States
- Name: 1932: Saint John; 1941: USS Antaeus
- Namesake: 1941: Antaeus
- Owner: Eastern Steamship Lines
- Port of registry: Boston
- Builder: Newport News Sb & DD Co
- Yard number: 350
- Launched: January 9, 1932
- Acquired: by the Navy, April 24, 1941
- Commissioned: May 17, 1941, as USS Antaeus (AS-21)
- Decommissioned: April 29, 1946, as USS Rescue (AH-18)
- Reclassified: AG-67, September 15, 1943; USS Rescue (AH-18), January 18, 1945
- Refit: Converted to a hospital ship at Brooklyn Navy Yard
- Stricken: August 15, 1946
- Identification: US official number 231530; code letters MJRF (until 1934); Call sign WHEI (1934 onward)
- Honors and awards: two battle stars for her World War II service
- Fate: Scrapped in 1959

General characteristics
- Type: passenger ship
- Tonnage: 6,815 GRT, 3,020 NRT
- Displacement: 8,350 tons
- Length: 402.7 ft (122.7 m)
- Beam: 61.0 ft (18.6 m)
- Draft: 20 ft (240.0 in)
- Depth: 29.7 ft (9.1 m)
- Installed power: 13,000 hp
- Propulsion: geared turbines, twin screws
- Speed: 20 knots (37 km/h)
- Complement: 440 as a hospital ship
- Armament: one 4 in (100 mm) gun mount aft; two 3 in (76 mm) gun mounts forward; upgraded to one 4 in (100 mm) gun mount aft; four 3 in (76 mm) gun mounts, two forward, two aft

USS Antaeus (AS-21/AG-67) was a commercial passenger liner that the United States Navy acquired in World War II. She was SS Saint John from 1932 until 1941 before the US Navy acquired her and commissioned her as Antaeus. From 1941 to 1943, she was a submarine tender; she was later redesignated AG-67 and used as a troop transport from 1943 to 1944. In 1945, she was converted to a hospital ship, renamed USS Rescue (AH-18), and served in the Pacific War. Decommissioned in 1946, she was sold for scrap in 1958.

== Civilian service ==
Newport News Shipbuilding & Dry Dock Company, Newport News, Virginia built Saint John in 1932 as a passenger liner for Eastern Steamship Lines. Saint John and her sister ship Acadia entered coastal service for New York – Yarmouth – Halifax or Saint John. From 1938 to 1940 the ship also ran in New York-Bermuda or Nassau service. In 1939, the ship was chartered to the United States Lines for one voyage to carry American construction workers to air base projects in Bermuda. Acquired by the Navy on April 24, 1941, the ship was renamed Antaeus (AS-21) and commissioned on May 17, 1941.

== World War II service ==
=== As USS Antaeus ===
Following her commissioning, the submarine tender operated in the Caribbean. She took part in training exercises and made repairs to the American submarines patrolling in those waters. Antaeus finished this task in September 1943, when she was assigned to transport duties and was redesignated AG-67. The ship then began shuttling troops to points in the Caribbean, the Panama Canal Zone, and to Argentia, Newfoundland, from bases at New York City and Davisville, Rhode Island.

=== As hospital ship USS Rescue ===
Antaeus entered the Brooklyn Navy Yard, New York City, on December 28, 1944. There she was converted to a hospital ship. On January 18, 1945, she was renamed Rescue and redesignated (AH-18). After her sea trials she got underway for the Pacific Ocean theater of action.

She arrived off Okinawa on June 13, embarked men wounded in the fighting ashore, survived unscathed despite almost constant Japanese air attack against Allied shipping in the area, and safely delivered her patients to a hospital on Guam.

With a bed capacity of 792 and a complement of 440, Rescue provided hospital services, consultation, preventative medicine, and casualty evacuation.

After a short upkeep period, Rescue joined the United States Third Fleet on July 5. She supported Third Fleet ships conducting carrier strikes and bombardment of the Japanese home islands. The ship would rendezvous with the combatant vessels and take on casualties by breeches buoy both at night and under battle conditions. Upon the conclusion of World War II, Rescue sailed into Tokyo Bay with the 3d Fleet and began the medical screening of Allied prisoners of war and shuttling them from various prison camps to the base at Yokohama.

== Post-war activity ==
In late September, the ship arrived at Guam where she discharged a few former prisoners whose home had been on that island. Rescue then proceeded to San Francisco, California. She was decommissioned on June 29, 1946, and was transferred to the U.S. Maritime Administration.

She was stricken from the Navy List on August 15, 1946. The ship was put in permanent reserve on September 28, 1948, in Olympia, Washington, and remained there until being sold for scrap in October of that year. She was scrapped by Dulien Steel Products, in Washington.

== Honors and awards ==
Rescue earned two battle stars for her World War II service:

- Okinawa Gunto operation
- 3d Fleet operations against Japan

== Bibliography ==
- "Steamers & Motorships". Lloyd's Register of Shipping. London: Lloyd's Register of Shipping. 1933. SAI – via Internet Archive.
- "Steamers & Motorships". Lloyd's Register of Shipping. London: Lloyd's Register of Shipping. 1936. SAI – via Internet Archive.
