= SS Yarmouth Castle =

American steamship lost in a disastrous fire

Coordinates: 25.9167°N 78.1000°W

- Yarmouth Castle sailing under her original name, Evangeline

History

United States
- Name: Evangeline
- Owner: Eastern Steamship Lines
- Builder: William Cramp & Sons, Philadelphia
- Yard number: 524
- Laid down: May 1, 1926
- Launched: February 12, 1927
- Acquired: October 4, 1927 (completion)
- Out of service: 1954
- Identification: Official number: 226690; Signal letters: MGNP
- Fate: Sold and transferred to Liberian registry

Liberia
- Name: Evangeline
- Owner: F. Leslie Frasier (1954-1962); W.R. Lovett (1962-1963)
- Operator: Eastern Shipping Corporation
- In service: 1954-1963
- Out of service: 1963
- Renamed: Yarmouth Castle
- Fate: Name and ownership changed in 1963

Panama
- Name: Yarmouth Castle
- Owner: Chadade Steamship Company
- Operator: Caribbean Cruise Lines (1963-1964); Yarmouth Cruise Lines (1964-1965)
- In service: 1964-1965
- Out of service: 1965
- Renamed: Yarmouth Castle
- Fate: Caught fire and sank 60 miles northwest of Nassau, Bahamas, November 13, 1965

General characteristics
- Type: Coastal passenger liner/Cruise ship
- Tonnage: 5,043 GRT
- Length: 378 ft (115 m) (waterline); 365.5 ft (111.4 m) registered length
- Beam: 55.7 ft (17.0 m)
- Depth: 26.7 ft (8.1 m)
- Installed power: 6 boilers
- Propulsion: 2 Parsons steam turbines, 7,500 S.H.P.
- Speed: 18 kn (21 mph; 33 km/h)
- Capacity: 750 first class passengers, 141 crew (as built/registered 1928); 365 Passengers in 186 cabins later service

SS Yarmouth Castle, built as Evangeline, was an American steamship whose loss in a disastrous fire in 1965 prompted new laws regarding safety at sea.

The ship was the second of two identical ships (Note: The first and sister ship was named Yarmouth (keel laid February 23, 1926, launched November 6, 1926, delivered July 7, 1927, official number 226635) and should not be confused with Yarmouth Castle. The sister ship was renamed Queen of Nassau in 1954; Yarmouth Castle in 1957; Yarmouth again, in 1961; San Andred in 1966; Elizabeth A in 1967; and scrapped in 1977.) built by the William Cramp & Sons Ship and Engine Building Company for the Eastern Steamship Lines for service on the New York City – Yarmouth, Nova Scotia route, operating in practice out of Boston as well.

During World War II, Evangeline was turned over to the War Shipping Administration, which operated all oceangoing vessels for the United States, and was used primarily as an army troop transport. Eastern Steamship Lines resumed control of the ship on July 1, 1946.

After a short period in service, the ship was laid up, and then sold in 1954 and put under Liberian registry, operating from Boston to Nova Scotia, then to the Caribbean. In 1963 Evangeline was sold again, put under Panamanian registry and renamed Yarmouth Castle; the ship was operated by Yarmouth Cruise Lines between Miami and Nassau, Bahamas, from 1964 until the disaster on November 12, 1965.

== History ==
=== Construction and early service ===
Evangeline was built for a new service between New York City and Yarmouth, Nova Scotia. The ship was laid down at William Cramp & Sons Ship and Engine Building Company in Philadelphia as hull number 524 on May 1, 1926. On February 12, 1927, the ship was launched and christened Evangeline, with completion in September and delivery on October 4, 1927.

The ship was a twin-screw, steam-turbine-driven vessel of 5,043 GRT, 378 ft (115.2 m) on waterline, 365.5 ft (111.4 m) registered length, 55.7 ft (17.0 m) beam and 26.7 ft (8.1 m) depth, with a crew of 141. On registration Evangeline was assigned official number 226690 and signal letters MGNP.

Evangeline had five decks, the upper three devoted to passengers with one cargo deck specially designed for automobiles. The ship had a glassed-in promenade deck, two social halls, a library, a dancing saloon and a verandah cafe. Six boilers provided steam to two Parsons turbines developing 7,500 shaft horsepower for a speed of 18 kn (21 mph; 33 km/h).

In actual operation Evangeline served on both the Boston and New York routes with seasonal variation.

=== World War II troop transport ===
On January 6, 1942, Evangeline was delivered to the War Shipping Administration (WSA) at New Orleans for wartime service. The ship had been evaluated for use as an Army hospital ship, and considered better than several actually converted, but was never converted nor used as a hospital ship. The ship was allocated to Army transportation requirements and operated by Alooa Steamship Company under an Army Transportation Corps time charter agreement until placed under a general WSA agreement with Eastern Steamship on March 25. On August 1, 1942, the ship was delivered at Norfolk, Virginia, for operation under bareboat charter by the War Department (Army) for operation as a United States Army Transport. The transport operated during the first half of 1942 out of New Orleans to Curaçao, Trinidad, Jamaica, Haiti, Panama and San Juan, Puerto Rico. After repair and conversion in Galveston, Texas, during September and October 1942, Evangeline began operations out of New York in November to Oran, Casablanca, Algiers, Bizerte and other North African ports, supporting operations after the landings in North Africa on November 8, 1942. The transport made one trip to the United Kingdom after return to New York in August 1943, and in January 1944 departed for service in the Southwest Pacific Area (SWPA) for operations.

Evangeline called at Bora Bora, Milne Bay and Noumea before a voyage repair period in Honolulu and then extensive repairs at San Francisco from April to June 1944. The ship went from San Francisco to Seattle from which the ship returned to SWPA and Espiritu Santo, Milne Bay, Oro Bay, Finschhafen, Townsville, and Brisbane. The Army assigned Evangeline the local fleet number X-18 for those operations and the ship was shown as part of the SWPA fleet until July 1945. The ship returned on December 25, 1944, to Honolulu, and in January 1945 to San Francisco, where the Navy took over jurisdiction briefly until April. On April 20, 1945, Evangeline was again under the Army and returned to SWPA until returning to Los Angeles in December 1945. In January 1946, Evangeline sailed in ballast to arrive at Boston on February 7, 1946, for delivery to WSA for disposition. On February 19, 1946, the ship was returned to Eastern Steamship Lines for operation under WSA agreement until permanent return on July 1, 1946.

=== Postwar commercial service ===
After being refitted and refinished at the Bethlehem Steel Corporation's shipyards at a cost of US$1.5 million, she returned to passenger service in May 1947. Fire safety was considered during the refit. Since an upgrade of the ship to the then-current construction standards was not viable, the United States Coast Guard allowed the wooden construction to remain but mandated several improvements, including the installation of a ship-wide sprinkler system.

She operated on the New York City – Bahamas run for less than a year, and was then laid up from 1948 to 1953, save for a two-month period in 1950. The ship was sold to a Liberian company called the Volusia Steamship Company in 1954. She was given an overnight run from Boston to Nova Scotia, and resumed service to the Caribbean in 1955. In the 1962 James Bond film Dr. No, SS Evangeline is seen in an early sequence.

The ship was sold in 1963 to the Chadade Steamship Company, and her name was changed to Yarmouth Castle that year. She offered service from New York City to the Bahamas for Caribbean Cruise Lines, which went bankrupt that same year. By the end of 1964, Yarmouth Castle was operated by Yarmouth Cruise Lines. The ship ran pleasure cruises on the 186-mile stretch between Miami and Nassau. She was under Panamanian registry.

=== Fire ===
Yarmouth Castle departed Miami for Nassau on November 12, 1965, with 376 passengers and 176 crew members aboard, a total of 552 people. The ship was due to arrive in Nassau the next day. The captain on the voyage was 35-year-old Byron Voutsinas.

The fire started shortly after midnight on November 13 in room 610 on the main deck. At the time of the fire, the room was being used as a storage space and contained mattresses, chairs and other combustible materials. No sprinkler head was installed in the room. The source of the fire could not be determined; it may have been caused by jury-rigged wiring, sparks entering through the ventilation or by carelessness.

A watchman did a security patrol between 12:30 and 12:50 a.m. but failed to systematically check all areas of the ship and detect the fire. At some point between midnight and 1:00 a.m. crew and passengers began noticing smoke and heat and started searching for a fire. When they discovered it in room 610 and the toilet above, it had already begun to spread and attempts to fight the fire with fire extinguishers were not effective. Attempts to activate a fire alarm box were also unsuccessful. The bridge was unaware of the fire until about 1:10 a.m. By this time, Yarmouth Castle was 120 miles east of Miami and 60 miles northwest of Nassau.

At 1:00 a.m. the engine room alerted the bridge that smoke was coming through the ventilation system. The captain was summoned to the bridge, instructed the crew to sound the alarm, and departed to locate the fire. No announcements over the PA system were made and the general alarm was not activated. The general alarm would have sounded alarm bells throughout the ship, alerted the passengers, and summoned off-duty personnel to the emergency stations.

After about five minutes, the captain returned to the bridge and at 1:20 a.m. ordered the ship stopped. The radio officer could not send a distress call because of flames and smoke in the radio room. The fire forced the crew to leave the bridge, and the captain gave order to abandon ship at about 1:25 a.m. At this point the general alarm could no longer be sounded and they were unable to issue the complete "abandon ship" signal using the ship's whistle.

The captain proceeded to the lifeboat containing the emergency radio, but could not reach it. He and several crew members launched another lifeboat and abandoned ship at about 1:45 a.m. The captain later testified that he wanted to reach one of the rescue vessels to make an emergency call.

The remaining crew proceeded to alert passengers and attempted to help them escape their cabins. Some passengers tried to escape through cabin windows but found them difficult or impossible to open due to improper maintenance. The sprinkler system activated but was largely ineffective due to the severity of the fire. Crew members attempted to battle the flames with hoses, but were hampered by low hydrant pressure. The investigation later determined that more valves were open than the pumps could handle.

While some lifeboats burned and others could not be launched due to mechanical problems, half of the ship's boats made it safely away. Passengers near the bow could not reach the lifeboats, but some were later picked up by boats from rescue vessels.

The Finnish freighter Finnpulp was just eight miles ahead of Yarmouth Castle, also headed east. At 1:30 a.m., the ship's mate noticed that Yarmouth Castle had slowed significantly on the radar screen. Looking astern, he saw the glowing flames and notified the captain, John Lehto, who had been asleep. Lehto immediately ordered Finnpulp turned around. The freighter radioed Nassau three times but got no reply. At 1:36 a.m., the Finnpulp successfully contacted the Coast Guard in Miami. It was the first distress call sent out.

The passenger liner Bahama Star was following Yarmouth Castle at about twelve miles distance. At 2:15 a.m., Captain Carl Brown noticed rising smoke and a red glow on the water. Realizing that this was Yarmouth Castle, he ordered the ship ahead at full speed. Bahama Star radioed the U.S. Coast Guard at 2:20 a.m.

Finnpulp was the first ship on the scene, aiding the first lifeboat, which carried the Yarmouth Castle's captain. After picking up the passengers and some crew from that boat, the freighter turned to rescue further passengers from the burning ship. Finnpulp also launched its own boats to rescue passengers.

By this time, Bahama Star had arrived on the scene. The ship stopped 100 yards from Yarmouth Castle and launched lifeboats, which lined up against the starboard side of the burning ship. Some people jumped into the water and climbed aboard the lifeboats. Others descended ropes and rope ladders. Finnpulp lowered a motorboat, which towed some of the boats to Bahama Star.

Starting about 2:30 a.m. the U.S. Coast Guard began sending planes and later helicopters to assist in the rescue. The airborne operations would continue throughout the following day.

All survivors had been pulled aboard Finnpulp and Bahama Star by 4:00 a.m. Yarmouth Castle capsized onto her port side just before 6:00 a.m., and sank at 6:03 a.m.

The wreck has not been located but is thought to rest at a depth of 10,800 feet (3,300 m) in the Atlantic.

=== Aftermath ===
Fourteen critically injured people were taken by helicopter from Bahama Star to Nassau hospitals. Bahama Star rescued 240 passengers and 133 crew. Finnpulp rescued 51 passengers and 41 crew. Both ships arrived in Nassau on November 13.

Eighty-seven people went down with the ship, and three of the rescued passengers later died at hospitals, bringing the final death toll to 90. Of the dead, only two were crew members: stewardess Phyllis Hall and ship's physician Lisardo Diaz-Toorens. While some bodies were recovered, most were lost with the ship.

The Yarmouth Castle fire was the worst disaster in North American waters since the SS Noronic burned and sank in Toronto Harbour with the loss of up to 139 lives in 1949.

=== Investigation ===
An investigation into the sinking was launched by the U.S. Coast Guard, which issued a 27-page report on the disaster in March 1966.

The board of inquiry found that the proximate cause of the disaster was the failure to detect the fire early on. Contributing to this were the inadequate security patrol and the lack of a sprinkler head in room 610. The construction of the ship, which contained excessive flammable material, allowed the fire to quickly spread out of control.

The high death toll was attributed to the fact that the general alarm and PA system were not immediately used to alert passengers and crew. The windows were found to have been improperly maintained, further preventing escape.

The report blames the captain and officers on the scene for not taking "firm and positive" action to organize firefighting and evacuation of passengers. It describes the captain's abandonment of the ship as "negligent" and an "overall failure to approach and cope with the difficulties." The board noted that while the ship's firefighting procedures were adequate, they were not properly implemented by the crew.

The report determined that Yarmouth Castle sank because the doors between the watertight compartments had not been sealed, allowing water to flow freely from the firefighting and sprinkler systems. This caused Yarmouth Castle to list and allowed more water to enter through open bulkheads.

Yarmouth Castle had passed a safety check and fire drill three weeks before the sinking. Although it did not need to conform to American safety regulations since it was registered under the Panamanian flag, it had to conform to the Safety of Life at Sea or SOLAS, and was regularly inspected by the U.S. Coast Guard.

== Legacy ==
The Yarmouth Castle disaster prompted updates to the Safety of Life at Sea law, or SOLAS. The updated law brought new maritime safety rules, requiring fire drills, safety inspections, and structural changes to new ships. Under SOLAS, any vessel carrying more than 50 overnight passengers is required to be built entirely of non-combustible materials such as steel. Yarmouth Castle's largely wooden superstructure was found to be the main cause of the fire's rapid spread.

Canadian singer-songwriter Gordon Lightfoot wrote a song based on the tragedy titled "Ballad of Yarmouth Castle." The song was released on his fifth United Artists album, Sunday Concert, in 1969. Along with Lightfoot's other UA releases, "Ballad of Yarmouth Castle" was re-released in a three-CD compilation, The Original Lightfoot: The United Artists Years, in 1992. The ballad was not Lightfoot's only shipwreck-themed song; in 1976, he released his album Summertime Dream, which included the song "The Wreck of the Edmund Fitzgerald," based on the sinking of the American-flagged Great Lakes freighter Edmund Fitzgerald in a November gale in 1975.

== See also ==
- List of ship and ferry disasters
