= USS General W. P. Richardson =

Ship built in 1944

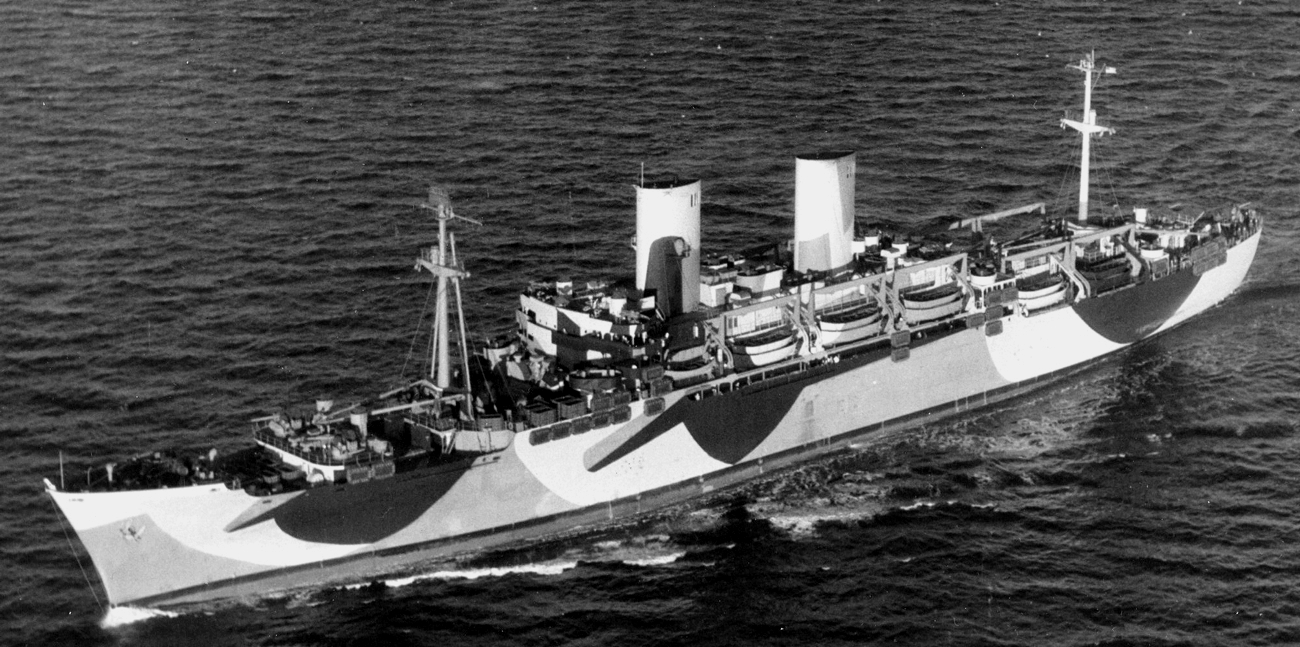
- USS General W. P. Richardson (AP-118) in camouflage paint circa 1944

History

United States
- Name: USS General W. P. Richardson
- Namesake: US Army General Wilds Preston Richardson (1861–1929)
- Builder: Federal Shipbuilding & Drydock
- Laid down: 2 February 1944
- Launched: 6 August 1944
- Sponsored by: Mrs Brebon B. Somervell
- Christened: General R. M. Blatchford
- Acquired: 5 April 1944
- Commissioned: 15 April 1944
- Decommissioned: 14 February 1946
- Renamed: General W. P. Richardson, La Guardia, Leilani, President Roosevelt, Atlantis, Emerald Seas, Sapphire Seas, Ocean Explorer I
- Identification: MC hull type P2-S2-R2, MC hull no. 676; IMO number: 5284053
- Fate: Scrapped in India, 2005

General characteristics
- Class & type: General John Pope-class transport
- Tonnage: 16,518 GRT; 11,111 NRT; 18,920 DWT
- Displacement: 11,450 tons (lt) 20,175 t (fl)
- Length: 622 feet 7 inches (189.76 m)
- Beam: 75 feet 6 inches (23.01 m)
- Draft: 25 feet 6 inches (7.77 m)
- Installed power: 17,000 shp
- Propulsion: 2 steam turbines, reduction gearing, twin screw
- Speed: 20.6 to 21 knots (38.2 to 38.9 km/h) (sources vary)
- Capacity: 4,244
- Complement: 533
- Armament: 4 x single 5"/38 caliber dual purpose guns, 4 x quad 1.1" guns, replaced by 20 x single 20mm guns

USS General W. P. Richardson (AP-118) was a troopship that served with the United States Navy in World War II. She was later transferred to the United States Army and served briefly during the Korean War as USAT General W. P. Richardson before entering commercial service.

== Construction and commissioning ==
AP-118 was laid down under United States Maritime Commission contract 2 February 1944 by the Federal Shipbuilding and Drydock Company of Kearny, New Jersey; named General R. M. Blatchford (AP-118) on 15 April 1944; renamed General W. P. Richardson (AP 118) on 1 July 1944; launched 6 August 1944; acquired by the Navy 31 October 1944, and commissioned at Bayonne, New Jersey, 2 November 1944.

== World War II ==
General W. P. Richardson sailed from Boston 10 December 1944 with over 5,000 fighting men and, after delivering them to Southampton, England, 21 December, returned to New York 4 January 1945 with troops and casualties. Ten days later the busy ship got underway from Newport News, Virginia, with 5,000 soldiers bound for Naples, debarking them 25 January and returning to Newport News 9 February with rotation troops and casualties. Underway again 18 February with 5,000 more soldiers she debarked them at Naples 1 March and subsequently carried 5,500 British troops thence to Marseille, returning to Naples 9 March to embark 4,600 homeward-bound US casualties and troops who were delivered safely at Boston 21 March.

General W. P. Richardson returned to Le Havre in April with 2,500 men and carried over 1,000 liberated American prisoners of war from France, and 2,900 troops and casualties from Southampton, home to New York on 28 April 1945. Following a troop-carrying run from New York to Naples and Trinidad and back, she sailed from New York to Southampton, putting in at Boston 26 June with 4,300 wounded and other troops. Through the summer and fall of 1945 the transport made four round-trip voyages from Boston to France, two to Le Havre and two to Marseilles to help ensure an even flow of men and supplies from the New World to the Old.

=== After hostilities ===
On 14 October 1945 she sailed from Boston to Karachi, India, via the Suez Canal and returned to New York 24 November with more than 5,000 veterans. On 30 November she embarked 4,500 rotation troops at New York and delivered them to Naples 10 December 1945, steaming thence via Suez to Khorramshahr, Iran, to take on board 3,800 men of the Persian Gulf Command, returning via Naples and Casablanca to New York 23 January 1946.

== Decommission ==
General W. P. Richardson was decommissioned at New York 14 February 1946 and returned to the Maritime Administration for peacetime operations as an Army transport until 10 March 1948.

== Commercial service ==
Returned to the Maritime Administration by the Army, she was subsequently chartered 6 May 1949 to operate as SS La Guardia for the American Export Lines until 1 December 1951, when she was returned to MARAD. The Army then briefly reacquired her for service in Korea until November 1952, when she was laid up in the National Defense Reserve Fleet at James River.

In 1957 she was bought by the Hawaiian Steamship Company and renamed Leilani on 5 February 1957. Laid up once again in San Francisco, she was seized by the Federal Government on 12 May 1959 and put up for auction the following month.

On 25 July 1960, she was bought by American President Lines, refitted at Seattle and renamed President Roosevelt. In 1970 she was sold to Chandris Lines and named Atlantis. In October 1972 she was sold again, to the Ares Shipping Corporation and named Emerald Seas.

After spending some time with Eastern Steamship, she was sold to Festival Cruises in 1992 and renamed Sapphire Seas. In October 1994 she was laid up in Piraeus, Greece, after which she was renamed Ocean Explorer I in 1998 for use at Lisbon as a Hotel Ship for Expo 98. She was later laid up at Eleusis, Greece.

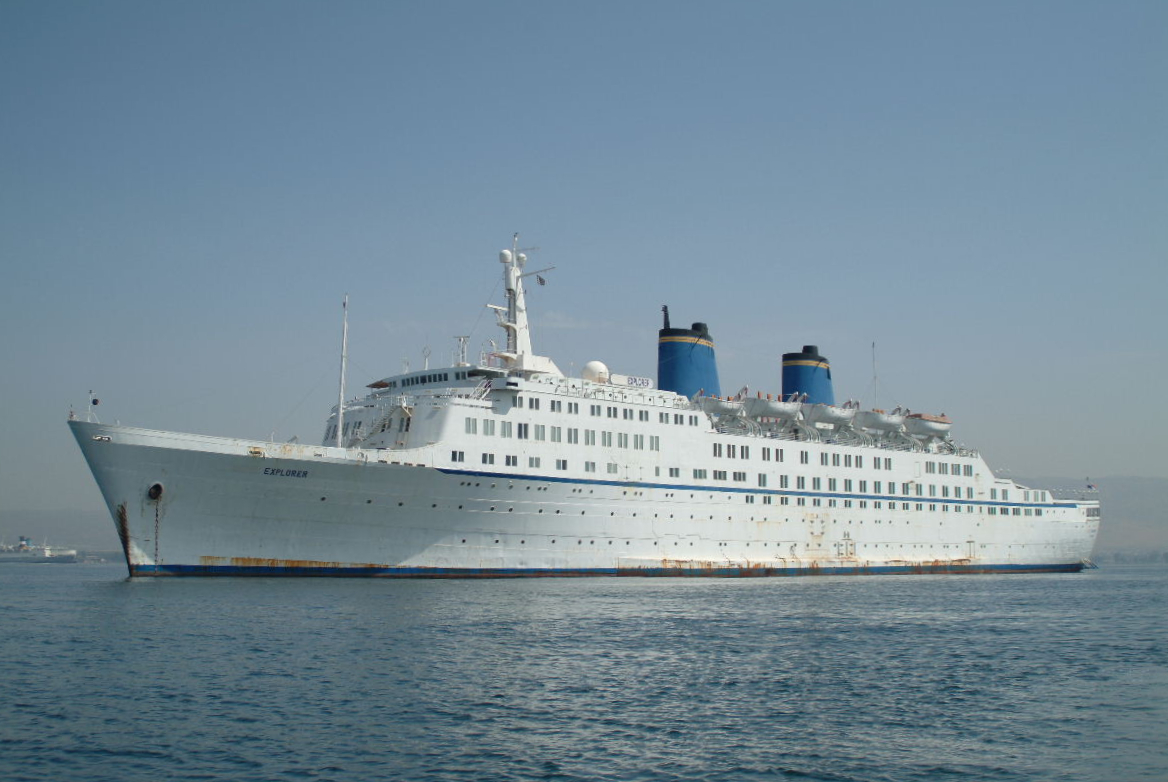
Explorer laid up in Eleusis, June 8, 2004.

In November 1999 she entered service with the World Cruise Company, but was taken out of service again shortly thereafter, in May 2000, and laid up once more at Eleusis. She was scrapped in India in 2005, having had a long career of about 60 years.
