= Eastern Steamship Lines =

American shipping company

Eastern Steamship Line

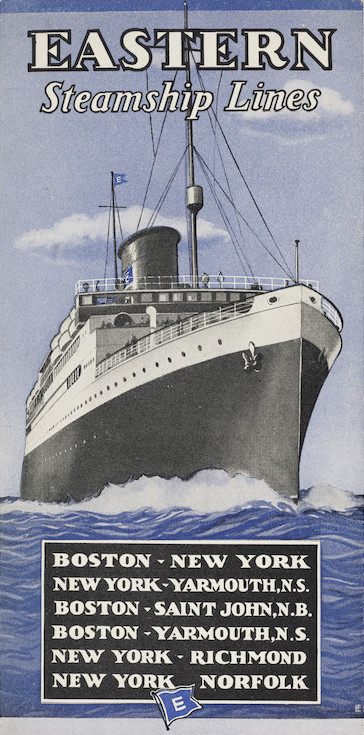
- Industry: Shipping
- Founded: 1901
- Founder: Charles W. Morse
- Defunct: 1955

Eastern Steamship Lines was a shipping company in the United States that operated from 1901 to 1955. It was created through successive mergers by Wall Street financier and speculator Charles W. Morse. The line sailed along the eastern seaboard of the United States and Canada, operating out of Boston and New York. Much of its fleet was sold to the US government for use in World War I. After the war the company ordered additional ships for the post-war period. Eastern Steamship Lines served as operator for the War Shipping Administration in World War II. The United States government requisitioned all of the fleet's vessels for military duty on both the Atlantic and Pacific.

== History ==
=== Background ===
Morse's father had a large role in the towing business on the Kennebec River in Maine. Charles was already involved in the shipping business while a student at Bowdoin College, and at his graduation in 1877 he had accumulated a sizable capital. After college he went into business with his father and a cousin, Harry F. Morse, forming C.W. Morse & Company and engaging in an extensive business shipping ice and lumber.

=== Eastern Steamship Company (1901-1911) ===
After profiting in the creation and sale of substantial holdings known as the "Ice Trust," Morse returned to the realm of shipping in 1901, when he established the Eastern Steamship Company by consolidating the Boston and Bangor Steamship Company, dating from 1834; the Portland Steam Packet Company, organized in 1843; and the International Steamship Company, established in 1859.

In 1902 Morse acquired control of both overnight steamboat lines on the Hudson River - the People's Line, established in 1835, and the Citizens' Line, established in 1872 - and organized the Hudson Navigation Company to operate them. They were collectively known as the Hudson River Night Line. The People's Line named its new 411-foot steamer C.W. Morse in his honor in 1904.

Morse acquired control of the Metropolitan Steamship Company from the Whitney interests in 1906. He organized the Consolidated Steamship Company in January 1907 as a holding company for the Eastern Steamship Company, Metropolitan Steamship Company, Clyde Steamship Company and Mallory Steamship Company. Despite an initial announcement of such a sale, Morse failed in an attempt to purchase the Long Island Sound steamers of the New York, New Haven and Hartford Railroad. He did, however, acquire control of the New York and Cuba Mail Steamship Company and the New York and Porto Rico Steamship Company in 1907.

He parlayed this success into a prominent role in high finance in New York City. A failure speculating in 1907 led to the collapse of banking interests Morse had acquired driving his steamship lines into receivership, for varying periods, in February 1908. Indicted by United States District Attorney Henry L. Stimson, Morse was convicted of violations of federal banking laws. He was sentenced to 15 years in the Atlanta federal penitentiary in November 1908 but remained free on appeal.

=== Eastern Steamship Corporation (1911-1914) and Eastern Steamship Lines (1914 onward) ===
The company was reincorporated in October 1909 in Maine with Morse as president. The Metropolitan Steamship Company and Maine Steamship Company were consolidated with the Eastern Steamship Company in 1911 to form Eastern Steamship Corporation. In 1912 The Eastern Steamship Corporation bought the steamships Yarmouth, Prince Arthur, and Prince George form the Canadian Pacific Railway. The vessels operated under the subsidiary called the Boston & Yarmouth Steamship Company, also known as the Yarmouth Line.

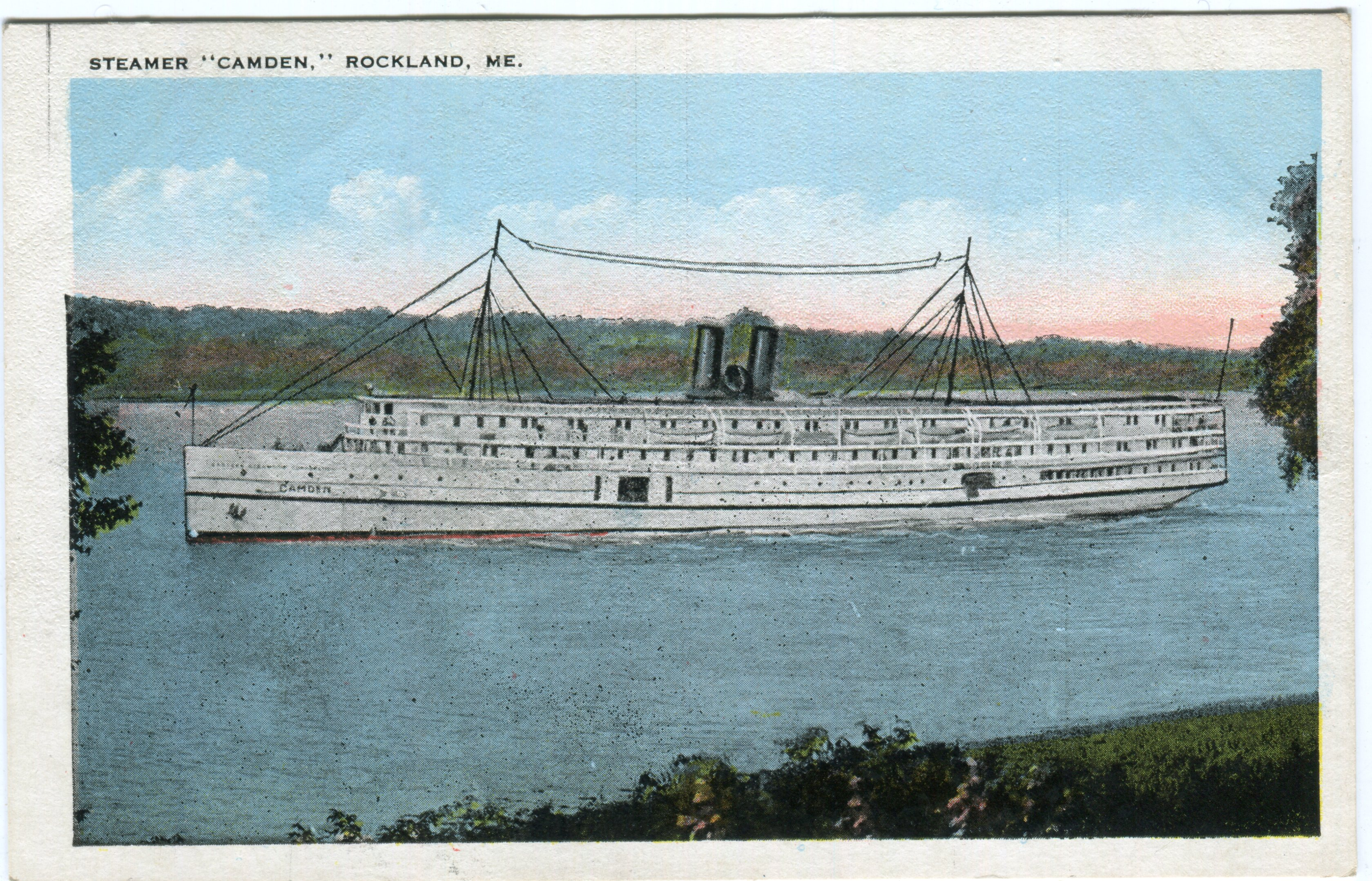
Steamship Camden

Coastal ship SS Belfast approaching dock 1909.

In 1914 Eastern Steamship Corporation went into receivership, and when it emerged in 1917 it had been reorganized as the Eastern Steamship Lines.

Much of its fleet served during World War I. Eastern Steamship Lines sold Boston to the US government for use in World War I. By the end of World War I, the Boston and Yarmouth were seen as old and obsolete, and after the war the government sold the Boston to private interests.

After the war, Eastern Steamship Line took advantage of the United States Shipping Board loans initiative for American built ships. In 1923, Eastern hired naval architect Theodore Ferris to design new ships for the New York to Boston route. The ships had to be stable enough to cross Block Island Sound but narrow enough to pass through the Cape Cod Canal. Two new ships, the Boston and New York, were built at Maryland Steel Company at Sparrows Point. Each ship was 402 feet long, with 345 staterooms. They entered service in 1924, replacing the North Land and Calvin Austin.

In 1924 Eastern would order two additional ships, the George Washington and Robert E. Lee, to replace outdated ships in their Old Dominion division for the summer New York to Norfolk Route. The ships were also designed by naval architect Theodore Ferris and built at Newport News Shipbuilding. They would replace the Hamilton and Jefferson. The ships were launched in 1925 under the Old Dominion Line flag, but would later change that same year to sail on the official Eastern Steamship Line flag. The vessels would be charted in the winters 1925–1927 to Clyde Line for the New York to Jacksonville and Miami route.

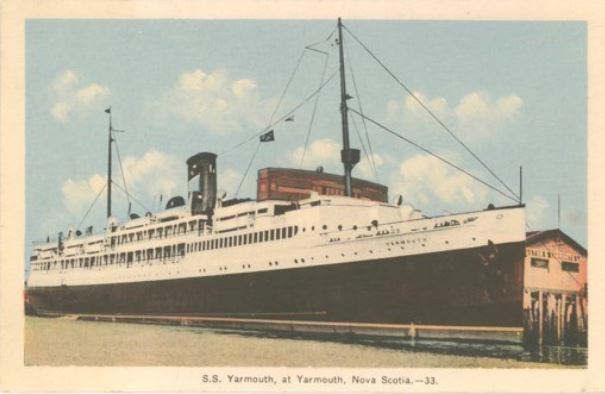
SS Yarmouth (1926), at Yarmouth NS

In 1927, Eastern Steamship Line replaced Prince George and Prince Arthur with two new purpose-built sister ships: the Evangeline and Yarmouth. Built at William Cramp & Sons, Philadelphia, the ships would sail on the Boston to Yarmouth route. In 1932, two more deep water ships were built for the line, the Acadia and the Saint John. Constructed at Newport News Shipbuilding, Newport News, Virginia, they would sail from New York to Norfolk, along with cruises from those ports to Bermuda or Nassau. These two ships would end up being the final ships built for the Eastern Steamship Line.

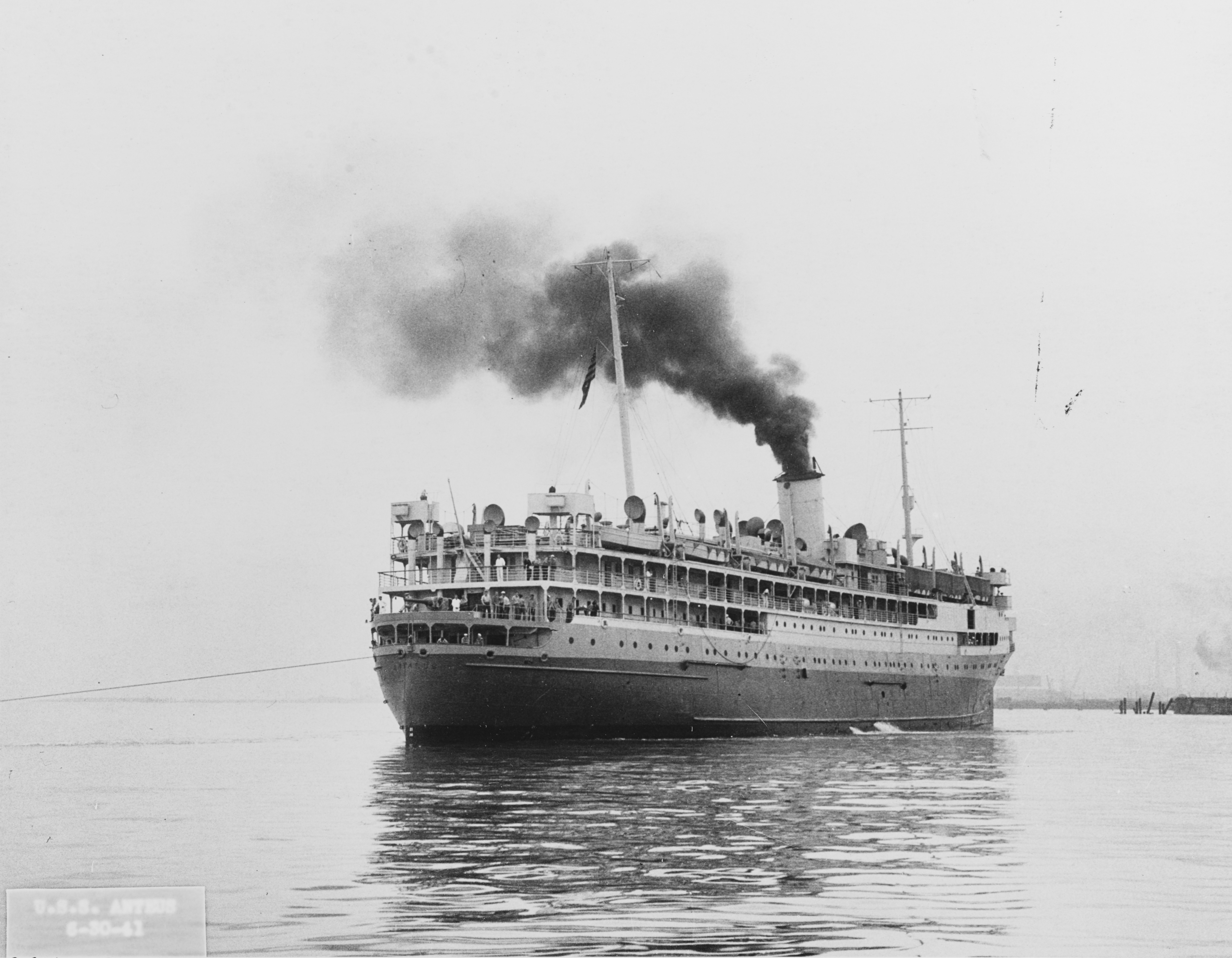
SS Saint John as naval ship USS Antaeus

Eastern Steamship Lines served as operator for the War Shipping Administration in World War II. The United States government requisitioned all of the fleets vessels for military duty on both the Atlantic and Pacific. Many of Eastern's ships would be torpedoed and sunk during the war, leaving few ships to return to service after the conflict was over.

After the war, only two of Eastern's fleet, the Yarmouth and Evangeline were in condition to return to service. The ships were officially returned to Eastern by the U.S. government in February 1946, and it would take a year to reconvert them to passenger service. The Yarmouth resumed regular service on the Boston to Yarmouth route, while the Evangeline sailed on weekly cruises from New York to Bermuda. The condition of the ship, even after the refit, lead to maintenance issues, along with higher costs of fuel and labor. This would lead to the sailings being canceled after a few months, and the Evangeline was laid up in New York.

=== Decline and cessation of business in 1955 ===
After a seaman strike in 1950, the American Merchant Marine required better crew accommodation and facilities for all American flagged vessels. Eastern Steamship Lines, which was already struggling financially, would not be able to afford the required updates, along with the conversion of some of the for-profit passenger cabins into non-profit crew cabins. Eastern Steamship would curtail this requirement by becoming one of the first lines to reflag their vessels to a flag of convenience with the less strict Liberian registry. The line was still able to keep many of its routes, but without a U.S. registry, it would no longer be allowed to go directly between American ports.

With ongoing financial troubles the Yarmouth was sold in 1954 to Frank Leslie Fraser of the Miami based McCormick Steamship Corporation for $500,000. The ship was renamed Queen of Nassau, and sailed within a division of the non-related Eastern Shipping Corporation. The Evangeline took over the Yarmouth's Boston to Yarmouth route during the 1954 summer season. The Canadian government would withdraw its subsidy, after ordering a new ferry MV Bluenose, for the 1955 summer season, which would lead to the end of the Eastern Steamship Line. The Evangeline's final sailing was on September 19, 1954, and the last ship to sail for line. She would be sold to the Eastern Shipping Corporation and would join her former sister for cruises to the Bahamas and Caribbean. The remainder of the Eastern owned piers, and laid up vessel Acadia, would be sold off, and all business would cease by 1955.

=== Revival of Name ===
The company name would be revived in 1965 creating a new Eastern Steamship Line. This was formed by the Eastern Steamship Corporation, the rebranded company that had originally purchased the Yarmouth and the Evangeline. However, it was revived in name only, with no official corporate connection to the previous company, but with similar southern routes from the previous line.

== Fleet list ==
Eastern Steamship Coastal Fleet
| | Year built | Years in Service for Eastern Steamship | Routes | Status | Notes |
|---|---|---|---|---|---|
| City of Bangor | 1894 | 1901-1927 | Boston to Bangor; Boston to Kennebec River | Sank in East Boston 1933 | Originally built for the Bangor Steamship Co. |
| City of Rockland | 1901 | 1901-1923 | Boston to Bangor; Boston to Kennebec River | Ran Aground, total loss, scrapped | Originally built for the Bangor Steamship Co. |
| Calvin Austin | 1903 | 1903-1931 | New York to Portland; Boston to Portland | Scrapped 1933 | Built for the International Division of Eastern Steamship Co. |
| Governor Cobb | 1906 | 1906-1917 | Boston-New Brunswick | Scrapped 1947 | First Turbine Steamship built in the United States; Ordered by the Eastern Steamship Company |
| Camden | 1907 | 1907-1936 | Boston to Bangor; Boston to New York | Scrapped in China 1955 | Built for the International Division of Eastern Steamship Co. |
| Belfast | 1909 | 1909-1936 | Boston to Bangor; Boston to New York | Wrecked 1947 | Built for the International Division of Eastern Steamship Co. |
| North Land | 1910 | 1911-1931 | Boston to Yarmouth; New York to Portland | Scrapped 1933 | Built for the Maine Steamship Company |
| Bunker Hill | 1907 | 1911-1917 | New York to Boston | Scrapped in 1947 | Originally built for William Cramp & Son as a freighter for the New England Steamship Company with sister Massachusetts |
| Massachusetts | 1907 | 1911-1917 | New York to Boston | Scrapped 1965 | Originally built for William Cramp & Son as a freighter for the New England Steamship Company with sister Bunker Hill |
| Yarmouth | 1887 | 1912-1926 | Digby – Saint John, New Brunswick | Scrapped 1920 | Built for the Yarmouth Steamship Company in 1887; Purchased from the Canadian Pacific Railway in 1912 |
| Prince Arthur | 1899 | 1912-1927 | Boston to Yarmouth, N.S. | Scrapped 1929 | Built for Dominion Atlantic Railway Steamship Fleet; Purchased in 1912 from the Canadian Pacific Railway; Replaced in 1927 by the Evangeline & Yarmouth |
| Prince George | 1899 | 1912-1927 | Boston to Yarmouth, N.S. | Scrapped 1929 | Built for Dominion Atlantic Railway Steamship Fleet; Purchased in 1912 from the Canadian Pacific Railway; Replaced in 1927 by the Evangeline & Yarmouth |
| Boston | 1924 | 1924-1941 | New York – Boston – Halifax - St. John's - Londonderry | Torpedoed and sank 1942 | Purpose-built for Eastern Steamship Lines at Bethlehem Shipbuilding Corp, Sparrow's Point MD; Given to Britain and transferred to the Ministry of War Transport in 1942 |
| New York | 1924 | 1924-1941 | New York – Boston – Halifax - St. John's - Londonderry | Torpedoed and sank 1942 | Purpose-built for Eastern Steamship Lines at Bethlehem Shipbuilding Corp, Sparrow's Point MD; Given to Britain and transferred to the Ministry of War Transport in 1942 |
| George Washington | 1925 | 1925-1941 | New York to Norfolk; New York to Boston | Scrapped 1955 | Originally ordered for Eastern's Old Dominion Line division |
| Robert E. Lee | 1925 | 1925-1942 | New York to Norfolk; New York to Boston | Torpedoed and sunk 1942 | Originally ordered for Eastern's Old Dominion Line division |
| Evangeline | 1927 | 1927-1955 | Boston to Yarmouth, N.S. | Burned & Sank 1965 | Purpose-built for Eastern Steamship Lines at William Cramp & Sons, Philadelphia |
| Yarmouth Castle | 1927 | 1927-1955 | Boston to Yarmouth, N.S. | Scrapped 1979 | Purpose-built for Eastern Steamship Lines at William Cramp & Sons, Philadelphia |
| Acadia | 1932 | 1932-1941 | New York-Yarmouth-Halifax or Saint John; New York-Bermuda or Nassau service | Scrapped 1953 | Purpose-built for Eastern Steamship Lines; Last ship to be sold from the original Eastern fleet |
| Saint John | 1932 | 1932-1941 | New York-Yarmouth-Halifax or Saint John; New York-Bermuda or Nassau service | Scrapped 1958 | Purpose-built for Eastern Steamship Lines; In 1939, the vessel was chartered to the United States Lines for one voyage to carry American construction workers to air base projects in Bermuda; Last ship built for Eastern Steamship Lines |

=== Other ships in the fleet (1901-1941) ===
- Boothbay
- Brandon
- City of Augusta
- Cumberland
- Della Collins
- Governor Dingley
- Hamilton
- Harvard
- Herman Winter
- H.F. Dimcock
- H.M. Whitney
- Jamestown
- James S. Whitney
- Jefferson
