= MS Island Escape =

Cruise ship (1982–2015)

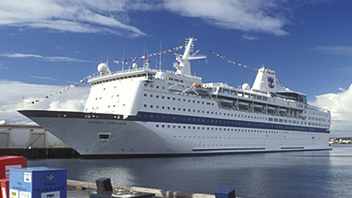
- Viking Serenade in San Diego

History
- Name: 1982–1985: Scandinavia; 1985–1990: Stardancer; 1990–2002: Viking Serenade; 2002–2015: Island Escape; 2015–2017: Ocean Gala; 2017–2018: Ocean Gala 1
- Owner: 1982–1985: DFDS; 1985–1987: Sundance Cruises; 1987–1988: Admiral Cruises; 1988–1990: Royal Admiral Cruises; 1990–2002: Wilh. Wilhelmsen; 2002–2015: Island Cruises; 2015–2017: Cruise Holdings Inc
- Operator: 1982–1983: Scandinavian World Cruises; 1983–1985: DFDS Seaways; 1985–1987: Sundance Cruises; 1987–1988: Admiral Cruises; 1988–1990: Royal Admiral Cruises; 1990–2002: Royal Caribbean International; 2002–2009: Island Cruises; 2009–2015: Thomson Cruises; 2015–2017: US Shipmanagers
- Port of registry: 1982–1991: Nassau, Bahamas; 1991–2002: Monrovia, Liberia; 2002–2018: Nassau, Bahamas; 2018: Togo
- Builder: Dubigeon-Normandie S.A., Nantes, France
- Cost: $100 million
- Yard number: 164
- Laid down: April 6, 1981
- Launched: October 16, 1981
- Christened: September 28, 1982
- Completed: 1982
- Acquired: August 20, 1982
- Maiden voyage: 1982
- In service: October 2, 1982-2015
- Identification: Call sign: C6SK4; IMO number: 8002597; MMSI number: 311368000
- Fate: Scrapped at Alang, India in April 2018

General characteristics (as built, 1981)
- Type: cruiseferry
- Tonnage: 26,747 GT; 4,294 DWT
- Length: 185.25 m (607 ft 9 in)
- Beam: 27.01 m (88 ft 7 in)
- Draught: 6.80 m (22 ft 4 in)
- Decks: 10
- Installed power: 2 × B&W 9L55GFCA diesels; combined 19,850 kW
- Propulsion: Twin propellers
- Speed: 20 knots (37 km/h; 23 mph)
- Capacity: 1,606 passengers; 1,606 passenger berths; 530 cars; 51 trailers

General characteristics (as of 2009)
- Type: cruise ship
- Tonnage: 40,171 GT
- Length: 623 ft (190 m)
- Draught: 7.20 m (23 ft 7 in)
- Decks: 9 (passenger accessible)
- Capacity: 1,544 passengers (lower berths); 1,740 passengers (all berths); 768 cabins
- Crew: 540
- Notes: Car and trailer space converted into cabin space

MS Island Escape was a cruise ship originally built as the cruiseferry MS Scandinavia in 1981.

The ship was renamed MS Stardancer in 1985 and Viking Serenade in 1990 before being converted to a cruise ship in 1991. She was renamed again as MS Island Escape in 2002, again as MS Ocean Gala in 2015, and lastly as MS Ocean Gala 1, before being scrapped in 2018.

== History ==
She was built in 1982 by Dubigeon-Normandie, Nantes, France for Scandinavian World Cruises, a subsidiary of DFDS, as the cruiseferry Scandinavia. At the time of her construction, she was the largest cruiseferry in the world. After being withdrawn from Scandinavian World Cruises, she briefly sailed for DFDS Seaways. Between 1985 and 1990, she sailed for Sundance Cruises and Admiral Cruises as Stardancer.

In 1990, the ship was sold to Royal Caribbean Cruise Lines and renamed Viking Serenade. Between January and June 1991, she was converted into a full-time cruise ship at the former Southwest Marine Shipyard in San Diego, California. The car deck was turned into a passenger deck. In 2002, she was transferred to the fleet of Royal Caribbean's new subsidiary Island Cruises as Island Escape.

She joined the fleet of Thomson Cruises in April 2009, but retained her name. Island Escape operated in the Canary Islands and the Western Mediterranean under Thomson Cruises. In November 2010, Thomson was scheduled to spend a further £4 million in refurbishing Island Escape. Thomson Cruises has operated the Island Escape under their all-inclusive Island Cruises since starting March 2013. In 2016, Thomson cruises replaced Island Escape with Splendour of the Seas.

On 3 December 2015, it was reported that the vessel had been sold and was on her way to Brest, France for dry-docking, to be renamed Ocean Gala.

In February 2016, Ocean Gala was offered as a floating accommodation facility through the website Floating Accommodations, managed by US Shipmanagers, a Florida company and it was announced that the Swedish Migration Agency have signed a contract to use the Ocean Gala as an asylum hotel for 1790 asylum seekers. Initially, permission was sought for a 4-year stint 2016–2020 in the Harbour of Härnösand.

Ocean Gala arrived at Utansjöverkets hamn at on 14 June 2016. A police report was filed against the owner of Utansjöverkets hamn by Härnösand Municipality, claiming the facility was missing ISPS classification.

According to media, the compensation from the Swedish Migration Agency at SEK450/asylum seeker would generate SEK805,500/day if the asylum hotel was operated at full capacity.

The asylum hotel plans did not come to fruition and the ship was put back on the market for either sale or charter in August 2016.

Since Ocean Gala did not comply with Finnish-Swedish Ice Class Rules, as well as to avoid increased costs for heating, the vessel left the port 3 November 2016. On its way to Esbjerg, a short stop was made in Tallinn to refuel. The vessel was in Denmark and completed its five-year survey with class society DNVGL.

After months off Suez as channel workers floating accommodation and calls at Limassol, she finally passed through the canal on 2 May 2017, heading down the Red Sea. It was speculated she was heading to Alang for scrapping. The next port turned out to be Khalifa, Abu Dhabi, for continued service.

In March 2018, after spending several months laid up in Khalifa, she set sail for Alang, where she was beached for scrapping on 4 April 2018 at Kaya plot 103.

== Accidents and incidents ==
In February 1988, chiropractor Scott Rolston murdered his wife, Karen Waltz, by strangling her and dumping the body overboard to make it look like a drowning. Karen was either thrown or pushed over the railing on the jogging deck and fell straight down into the water below. Rolston was later convicted of her murder.

On May 25, 2006, Micki Kanesaki was murdered by her ex-husband, Lonnie Kocontes, while aboard the Island Escape. Kanesaki was murdered in the same manner as Karen Waltz 18 years earlier.

== In popular culture ==
Island Escape was featured in a mini-series TV documentary which consisted of 10 episodes. The documentary was initially broadcast in the UK during 2002. Repeats of the documentary were later shown on Bravo. The documentary followed the working lives of crew members and gave insight into what it was like to work on a cruise ship.

== Gallery ==
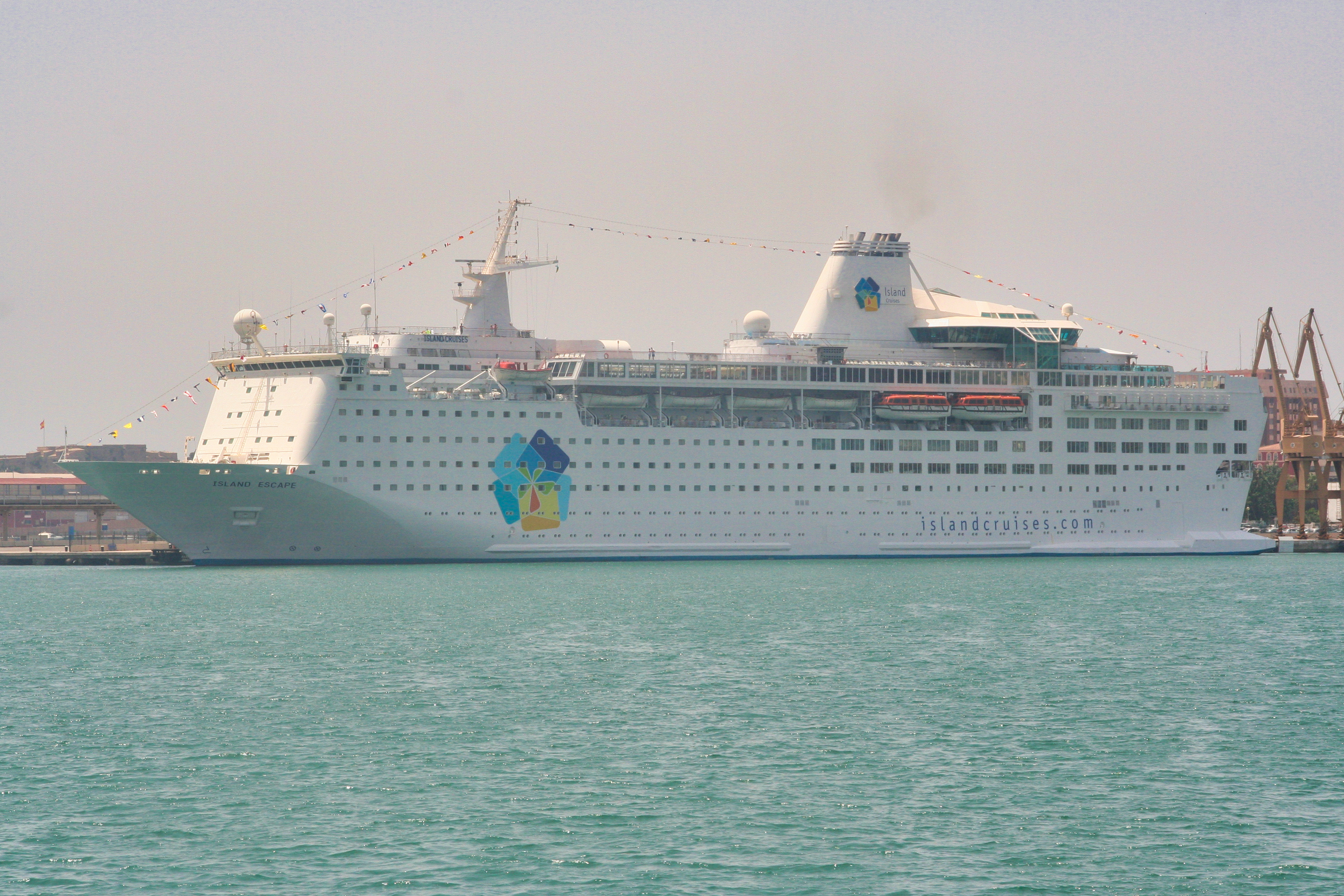
As Island Escape in Spain in 2006

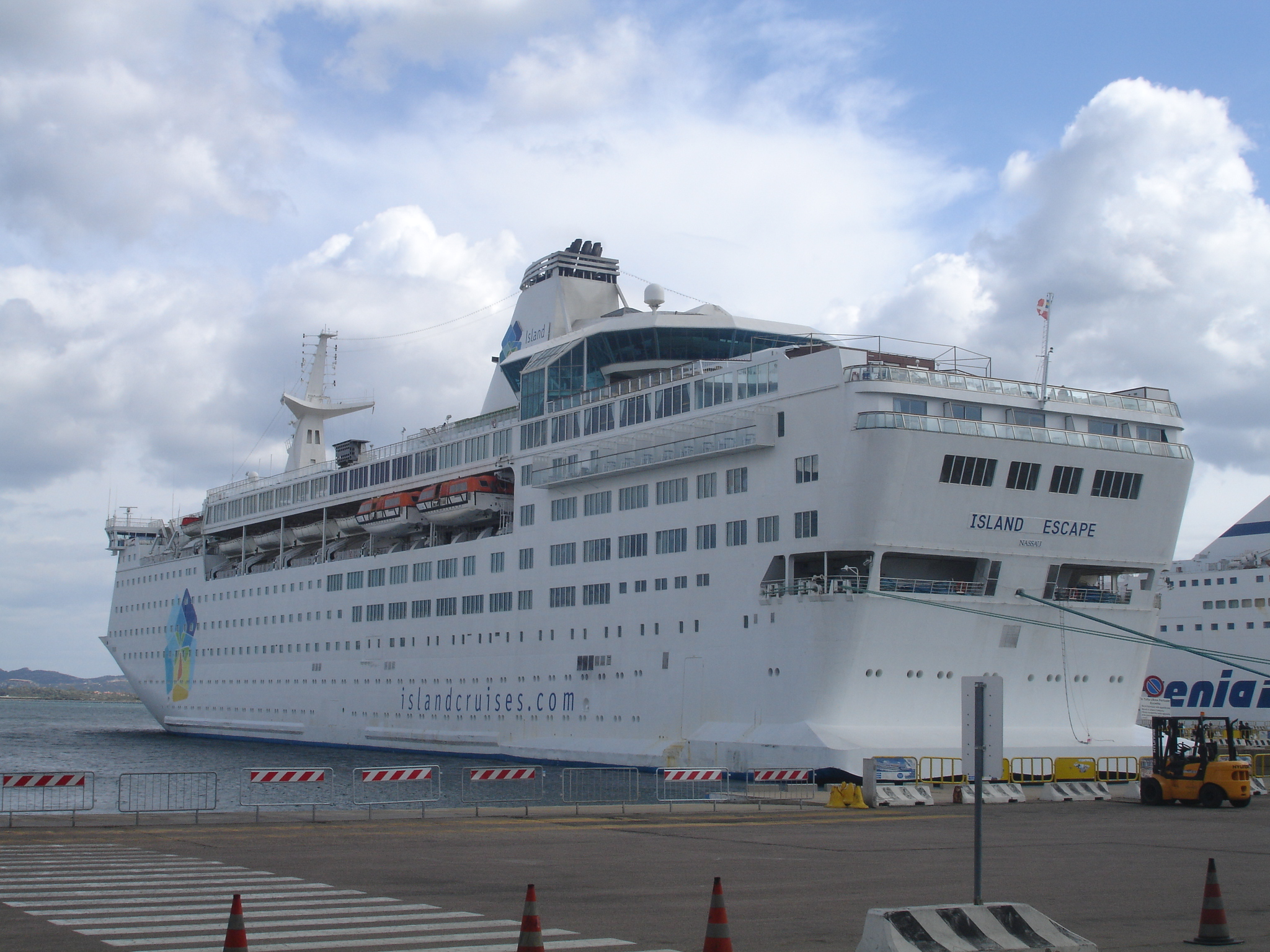
Island Escape in Sardinia in 2008

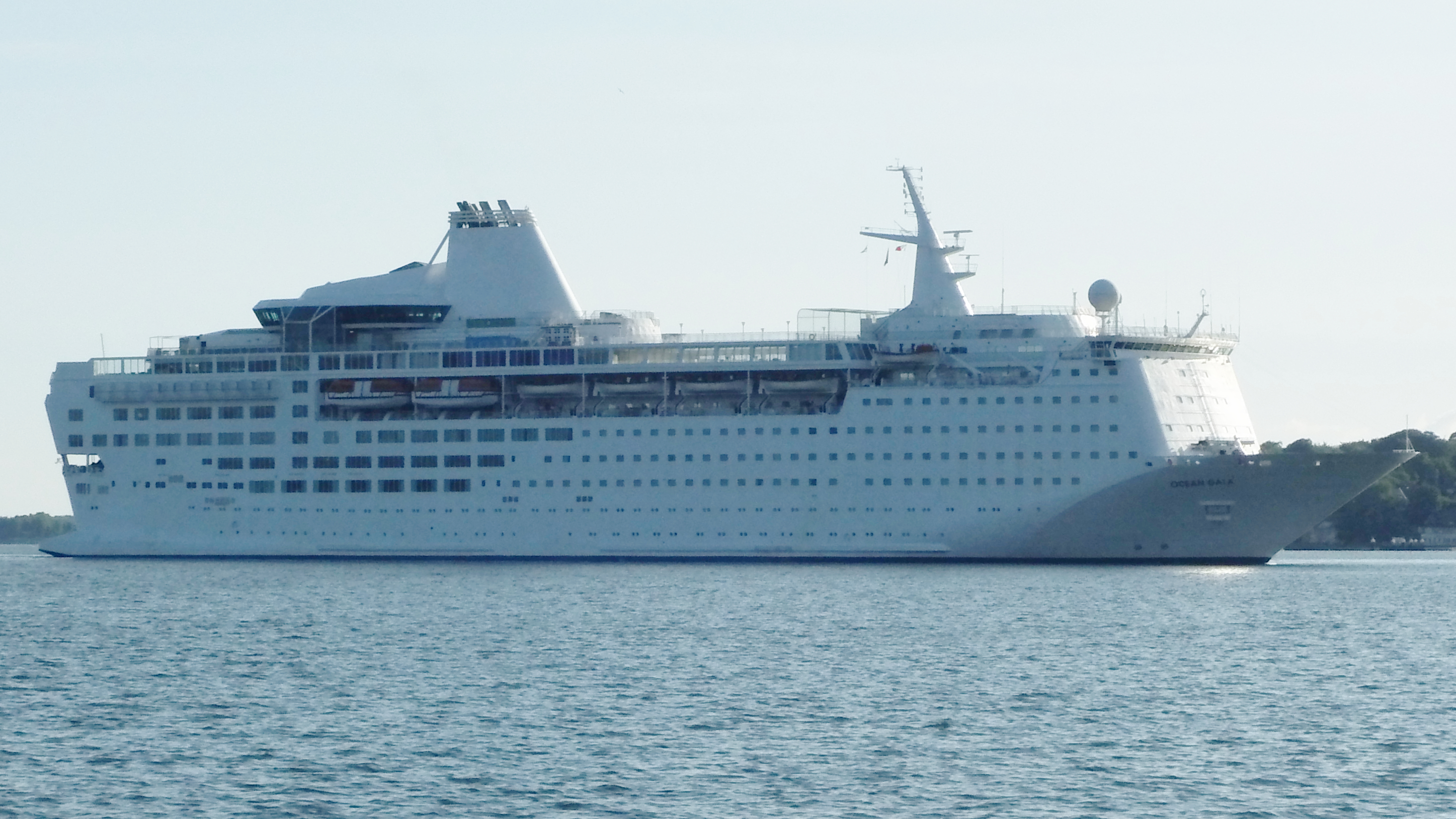
Ocean Gala in Kiel

Preceded by MS Silvia Regina	World's Largest Cruiseferry; 1982–1985	Succeeded by MS Svea
