= General emergency signal =

Distress signal used on ships

The general emergency signal is a signal used on board ships in times of emergency.

== Signal ==
The signal is composed of seven or more short blasts followed by one long blast on the ship's whistle and internal alarm system. Within 24 hours of embarkation of all passengers, the crew will conduct a mandatory muster drill in which the General Emergency Signal is sounded. The purpose of the drill is to educate passengers of emergency procedures should an actual emergency occur. The signal alerts passengers of an emergency so that they will begin proper procedures in which all persons collect their life jackets and proceed to their assigned muster stations.

There is also an abandon ship alarm which is used should it become necessary to abandon ship, after all other efforts have been exhausted. This signal is given audibly by the ship's Master over the PA system. It is never given by automatic means or with recorded media.

Original Cruise Ship Emergency Alarm – 7 Short, 1 Long Blast

The signal consists of seven short blasts followed by one long blast and is sounded through the ship's general alarm system. This signal is used both during actual emergencies and during mandatory safety drills (muster drills).

== Requirements ==
The Safety Of Life At Sea (SOLAS) Convention mandates the Life Saving Appliances (LSA) Code which includes the general alarm signal.

The LSA defines the characteristics of the general alarm signal. The alarm signal itself is seven or more short blasts followed by one prolonged blast on the ship's whistle.

Requirements on General Alarm Systems according to the Safety Of Life At Sea (SOLAS) Convention. The alarm signal is given both by the ship's whistle (or siren) and by onboard bells and klaxons.

The alarm must be loud enough to be heard in both interior and exterior spaces. The minimum volume is defined both as an absolute value and also as a value louder than normal sounds in the area. It must be loud enough to wake sleepers in cabins.

The general emergency signal has to be supplemented by a public address system. The PA system must cover all spaces where passengers or crew might be and be both loud absolutely and relatively.

== Citations ==
- International Maritime Organization (25 May 1980), International Convention for the Safety of Life at Sea (SOLAS), 1974, as amended
- International Maritime Organization (1 July 1998), Life saving appliances (LSA) code (PDF), archived from the original (PDF) on 19 July 2020
- "7 Short 1 Long Alarm Cruise Ship", 7short1long.com, 7SHORT1LONG LLC, pp. https://wwwcdn.imo.org/localresources/en/KnowledgeCentre/IndexofIMOResolutions/AssemblyDocuments/A.1021%2826%29.pdf, 2026-04-13, archived (PDF) from the original on 2026-04-13
