= Duke of York (1780 ship) =

History

Great Britain
- Name: Duke of York
- Owner: Richard Cadman Etches
- Builder: Archangel
- Launched: 1780
- Fate: Lost 11 September 1787

General characteristics
- Tons burthen: 500 (bm)
- Propulsion: Sail

Duke of York was a fir-built ship of 500 tons (bm), built in 1780 at Archangel. In 1787 her owner was "Hitchie", her master "Jn Wolff", and her trade London—South Seas, indicating that she was a whaler. More accurately, her master was John Wolfe, Woolf, or Wolf, and her owner Richard Cadman Etches. She sailed on 21 April 1787 for the South Seas.

Etches had received a license from the South Sea Company to sail around Cape Horn into the Pacific. He dispatched her to reinforce the settlement at New Years Harbour (now Puerto Ano Nuevo) on Staten Island (now Isla de los Estados), off Tierra del Fuego. (Note: Captain James Cook, then on his second voyage of exploration, had named the harbour after the date of his arrival, New Year's Day, 1775.) Seal hunters established a factory there in 1786, which was also well-located for vessels rounding Cape Horn to refresh and replenish their water.

On 4 June, Duke of York sailed from St Jago, "all well". By August, she was at the Falkland Islands, "all well".

On 11 September, shortly after she arrived at New Years Harbour, Duke of York was lost. Her crew, however, was saved.

The loss of Duke of York ended the factory. The people took to their boats and left the island.
