= Ushuaia =

- City and port
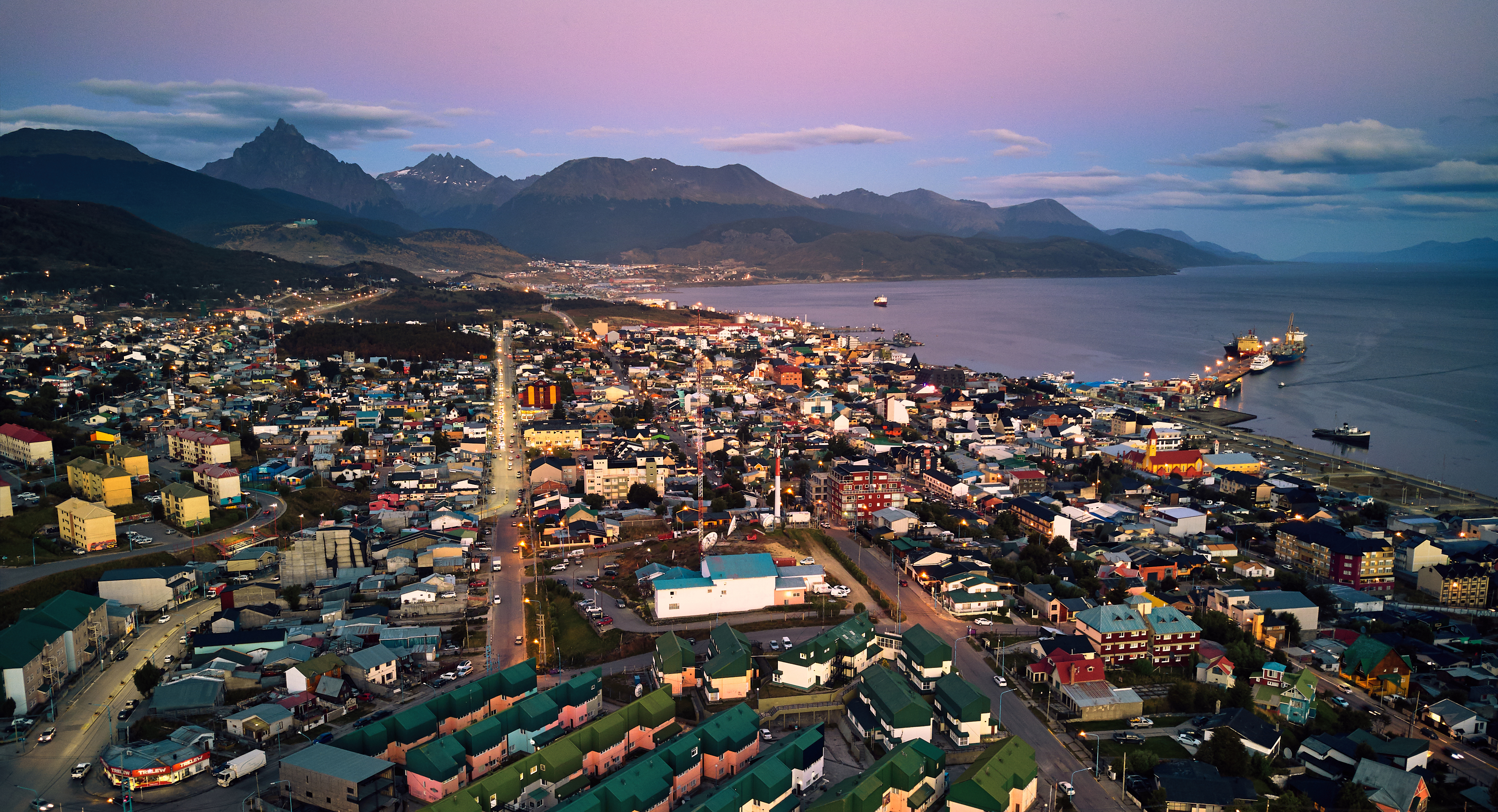
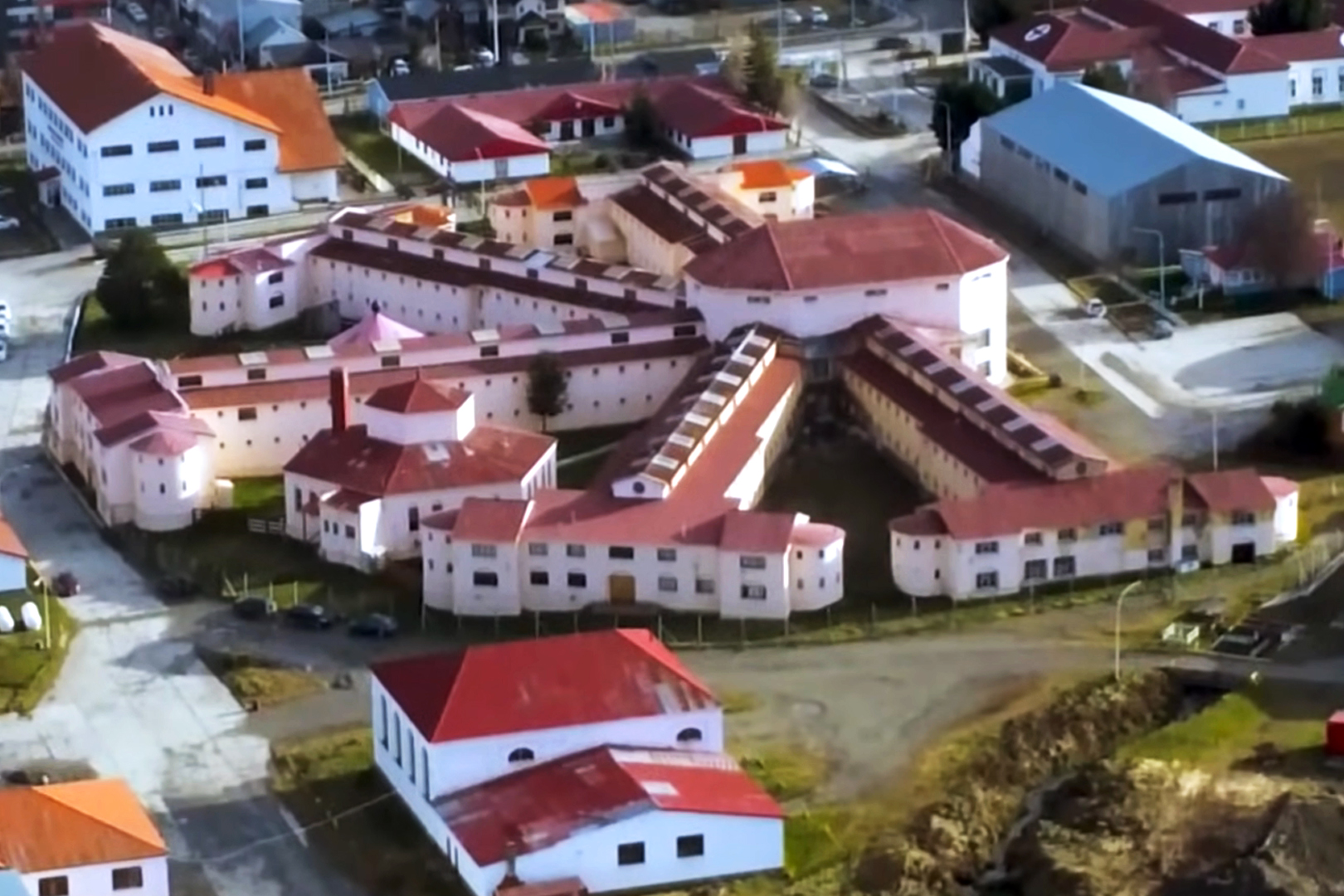
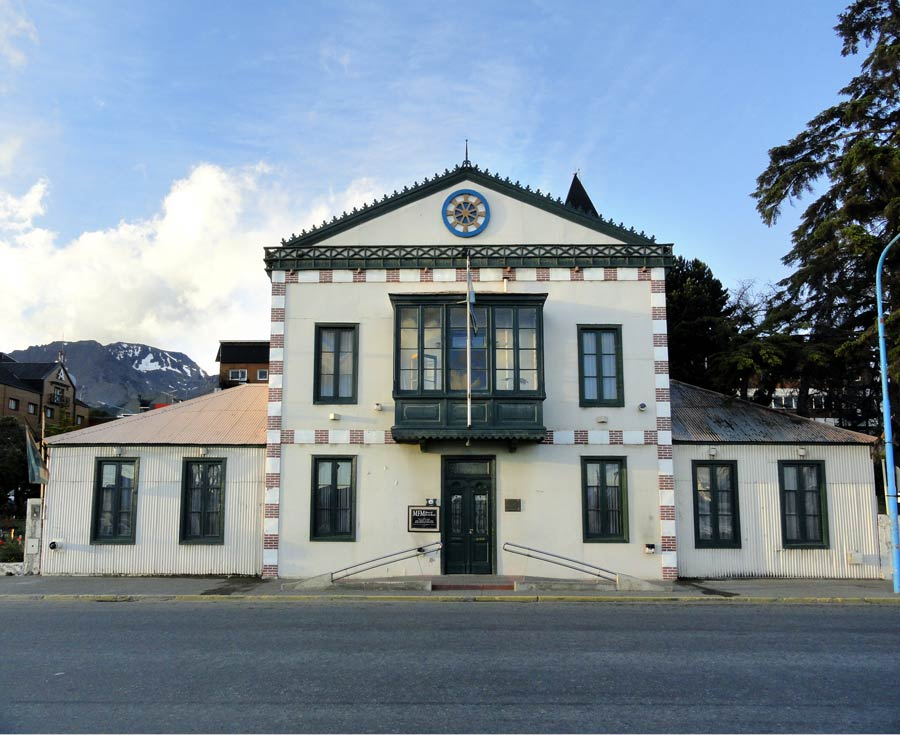
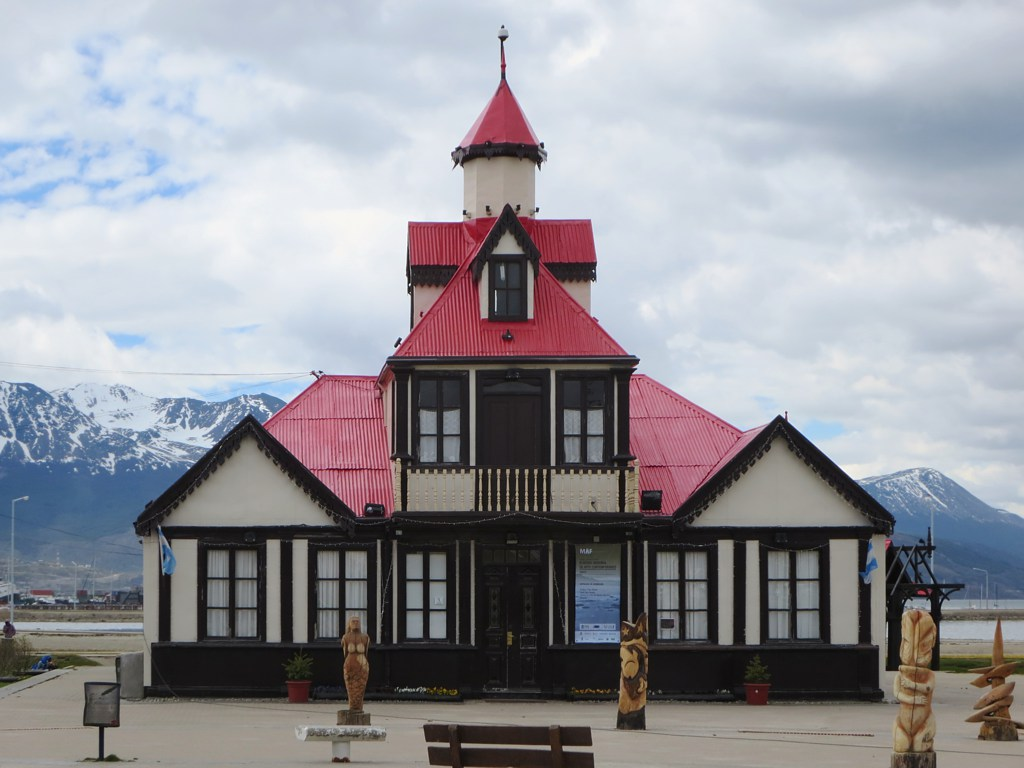
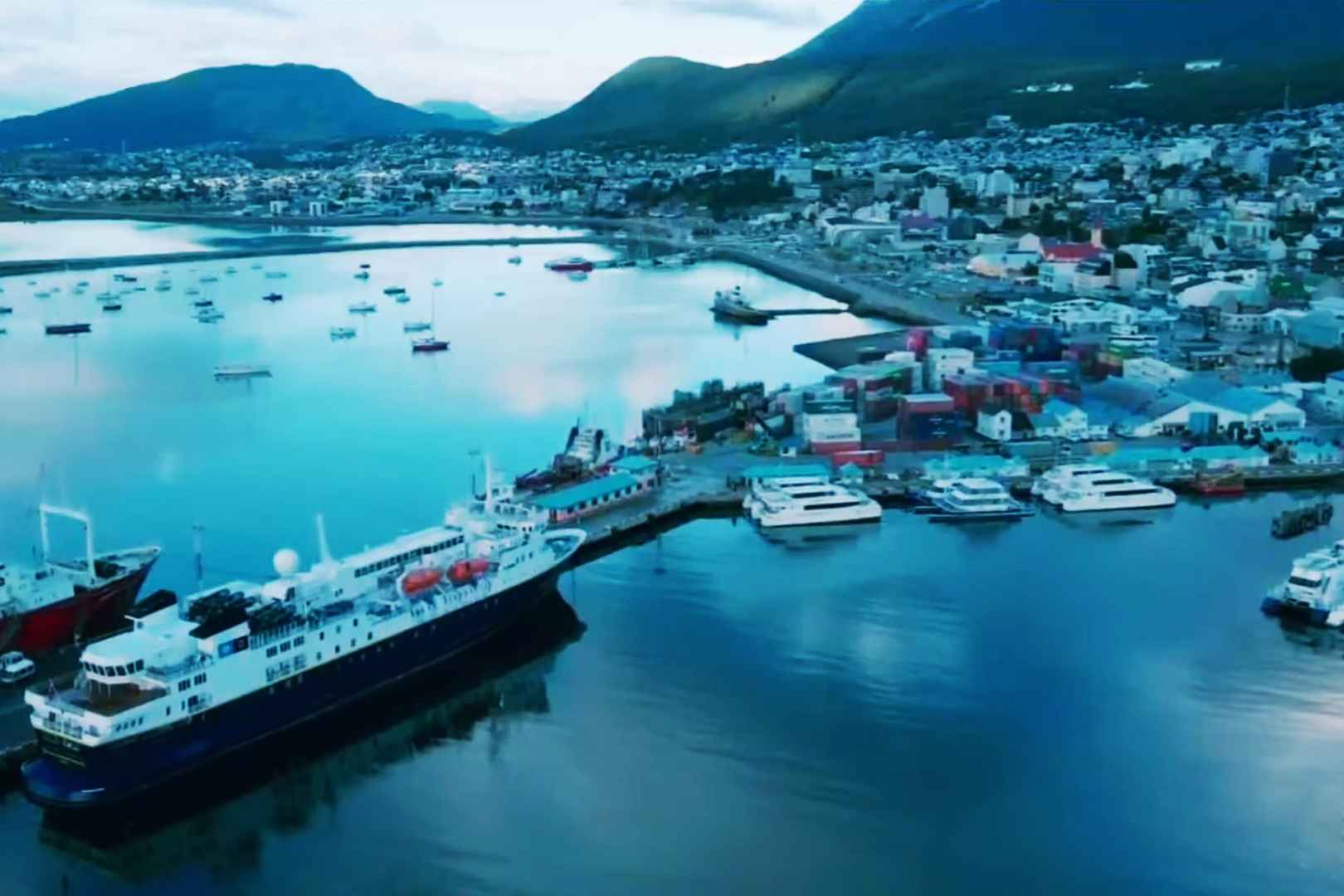
- Aerial view of central Ushuaia from the west, with the Beagle Channel and the Martial Mountains in the background Maritime and Prison Museum of Ushuaia Former Government House of Ushuaia Beban House Port of Ushuaia

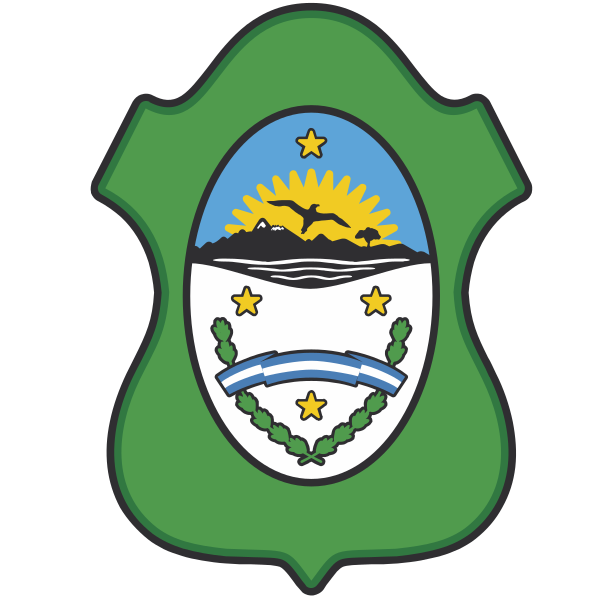
- Coat of arms
- Motto: "Ushuaia, fin del mundo, principio de todo" (Spanish) "Ushuaia, end of the world, beginning of everything"
- Location within Tierra del Fuego and Isla de los Estados Location within Argentina
- Coordinates: 54°48′26″S 68°18′29″W
- Country: Argentina
- Province: Tierra del Fuego
- Department: Ushuaia
- Founded: 12 October 1884
- Founder: Augusto Lasserre

Government
  - Type: Municipality
  - Intendant: Walter Vuoto (PJ)

Area
  - Total: 23 km^{2} (8.9 sq mi)
- Elevation: 23 m (75 ft)

Population (2026 Census)
  - Total: 84,378
  - Density: 3,700/km^{2} (9,500/sq mi)
- Demonym: Ushuaiense
- Time zone: UTC−3 (ART)
- CPA Base: V 9410
- Area code: +54 2901
- Climate: ET/Cfc
- Website: www.ushuaia.gob.ar

Ushuaia (/uːˈswaɪ.ə/ oo-SWY-ə, Spanish: [uˈswaja]) is the capital of Tierra del Fuego, Antártida e Islas del Atlántico Sur Province, Argentina. With a population of 89,606 and a location below the 54th parallel south latitude, Ushuaia claims the title of the world's southernmost city.

Ushuaia is located in a wide bay on the southern coast of Isla Grande de Tierra del Fuego. It is bounded on the north by the Martial mountain range and on the south by the Beagle Channel. It is the only municipality in the Department of Ushuaia and has an area of 9,390 km^{2} (3,625 sq mi). It was founded on 12 October 1884 by Augusto Lasserre and is located on the shores of the Beagle Channel surrounded by the mountain range of the Martial Glacier, in the Bay of Ushuaia. In addition to being an administrative center, it is a light industrial port and tourist destination. Ushuaia is located roughly 1,100 kilometres (680 mi) from the Antarctic Peninsula and is one of five internationally recognized Antarctic gateway cities; it is one of two South American cities with that status along with Chile's Punta Arenas.

== Toponyms ==
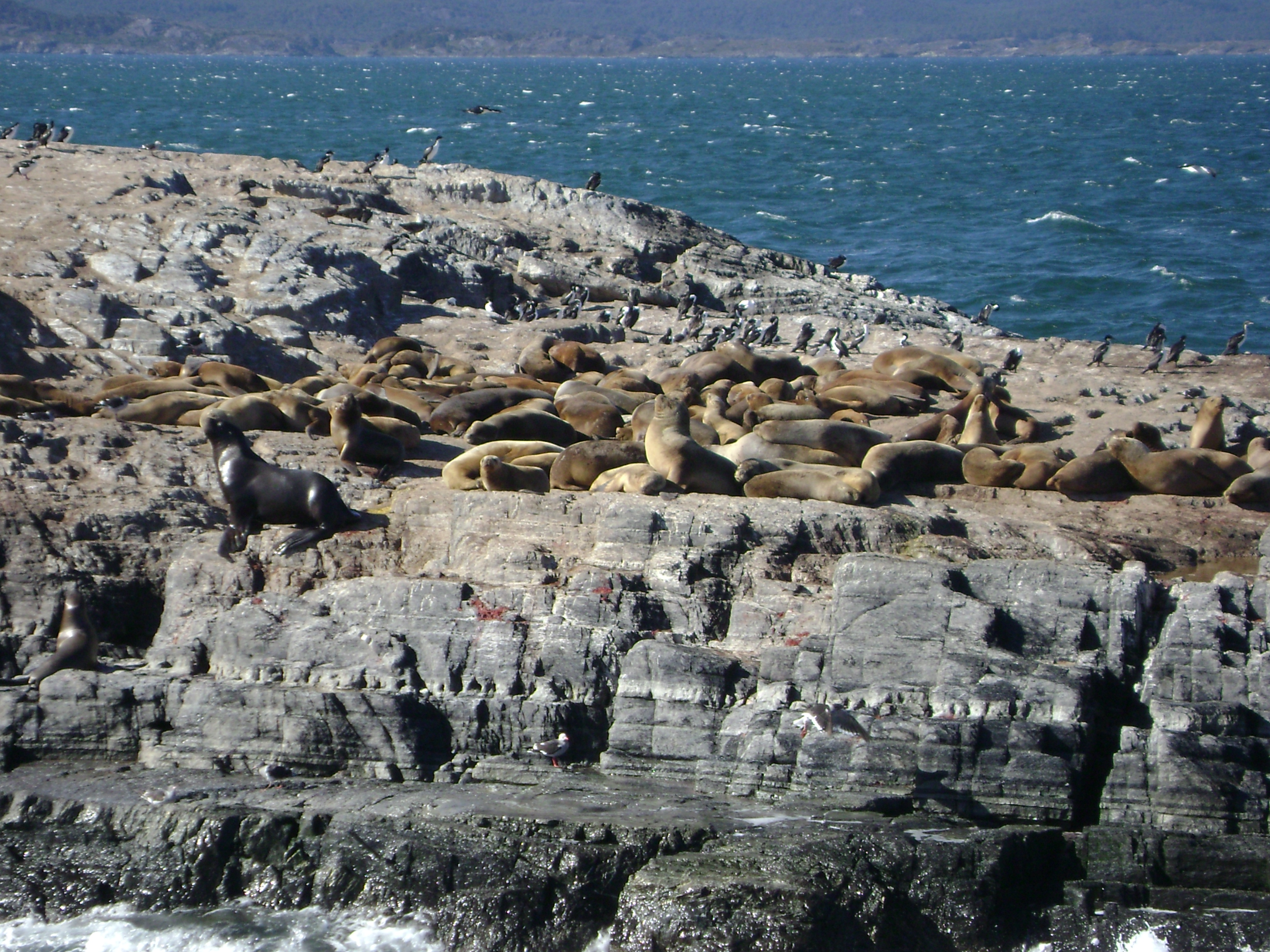
Seal colony on the Isla de los Lobos

The word Ushuaia comes from the Yaghan language: ush and waia ('bay' or 'cove') and means "deep bay' or 'bay to background'. The act creating the subprefecture in 1884 cites the name "Oshovia", one of the many orthographic variations of the word. Its demonym is Ushuaiense.

== History ==
The Selkʼnam people, also called the Ona, first arrived in Tierra del Fuego about 10,000 years ago. The southern group of people indigenous to the area, the Yaghan (also known as Yámana), who occupied what is now Ushuaia, lived in continual conflict with the northern inhabitants of the island.

For much of the latter half of the 19th century, the eastern portion of Tierra del Fuego was populated by a substantial majority of nationals who were not Argentine citizens, including a number of British subjects. Ushuaia was founded informally by British missionaries, following previous British surveys, long before Argentine nationals or government representatives arrived there on a permanent basis. The British ship HMS Beagle, under the command of Captain Robert FitzRoy, first reached the channel on January 29, 1833, during its maiden voyage surveying Tierra del Fuego. The city was originally named by early British missionaries using the native Yámana name for the area. Much of the early history of the city and its hinterland is described in Lucas Bridges’s book Uttermost Part of the Earth (1948). The name Ushuaia first appears in letters and reports of the South American Mission Society in England. The British missionary Waite Hockin Stirling became the first European to live in Ushuaia when he stayed with the Yámana people between 18 January and mid-September 1869. In 1870 more British missionaries arrived to establish a small settlement. The following year the first marriage was performed. During 1872, 36 baptisms and seven marriages and the first European birth (Thomas Despard Bridges) in Tierra del Fuego were registered. The first house constructed in Ushuaia was a pre-assembled three room home prepared in the Falkland Islands in 1870 for Reverend Thomas Bridges. One room was for the Bridges family, a second was for a Yámana married couple, while the third served as the chapel.

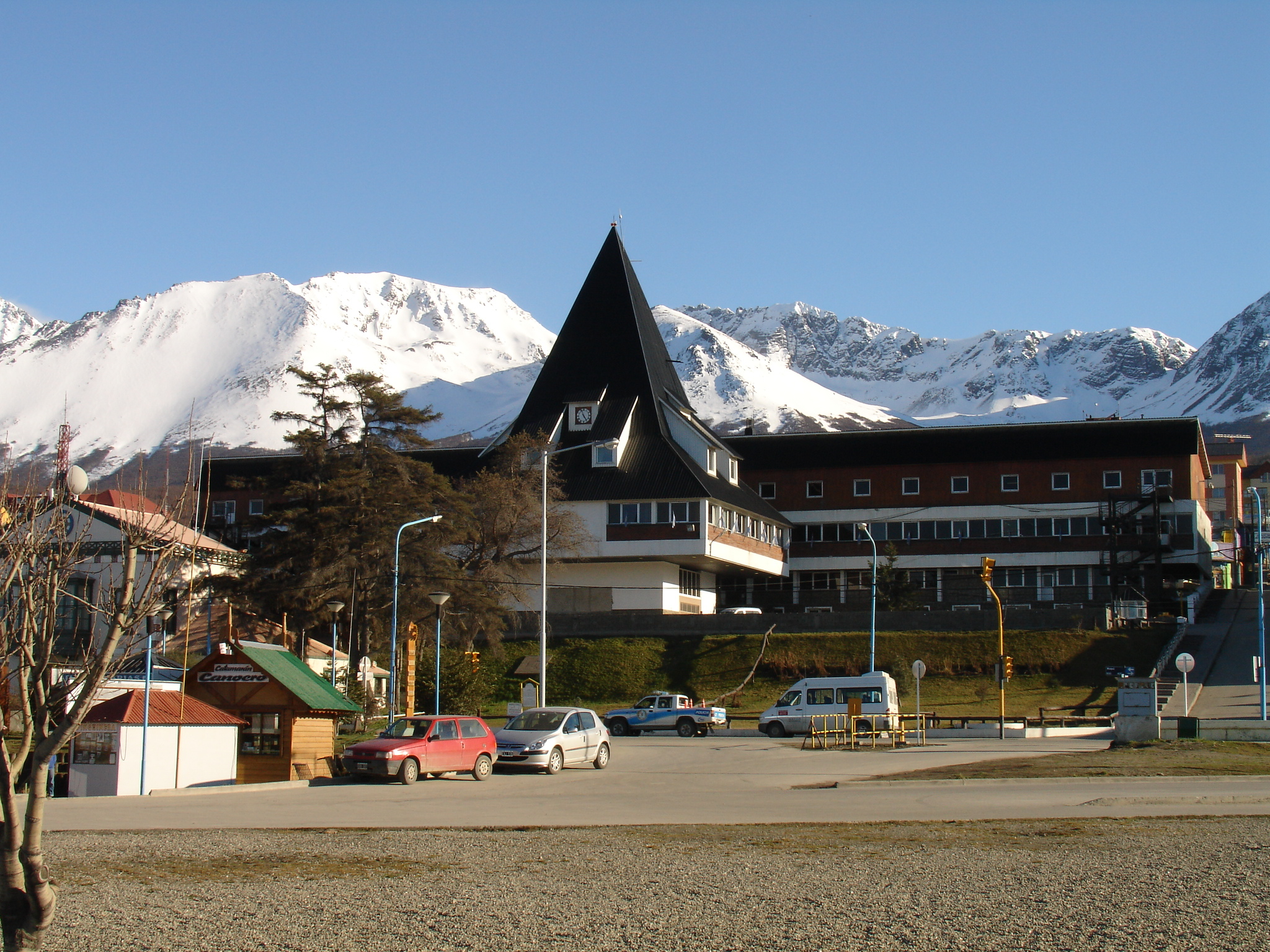
Building of the government of the province in the city of Ushuaia, with typical local architecture.

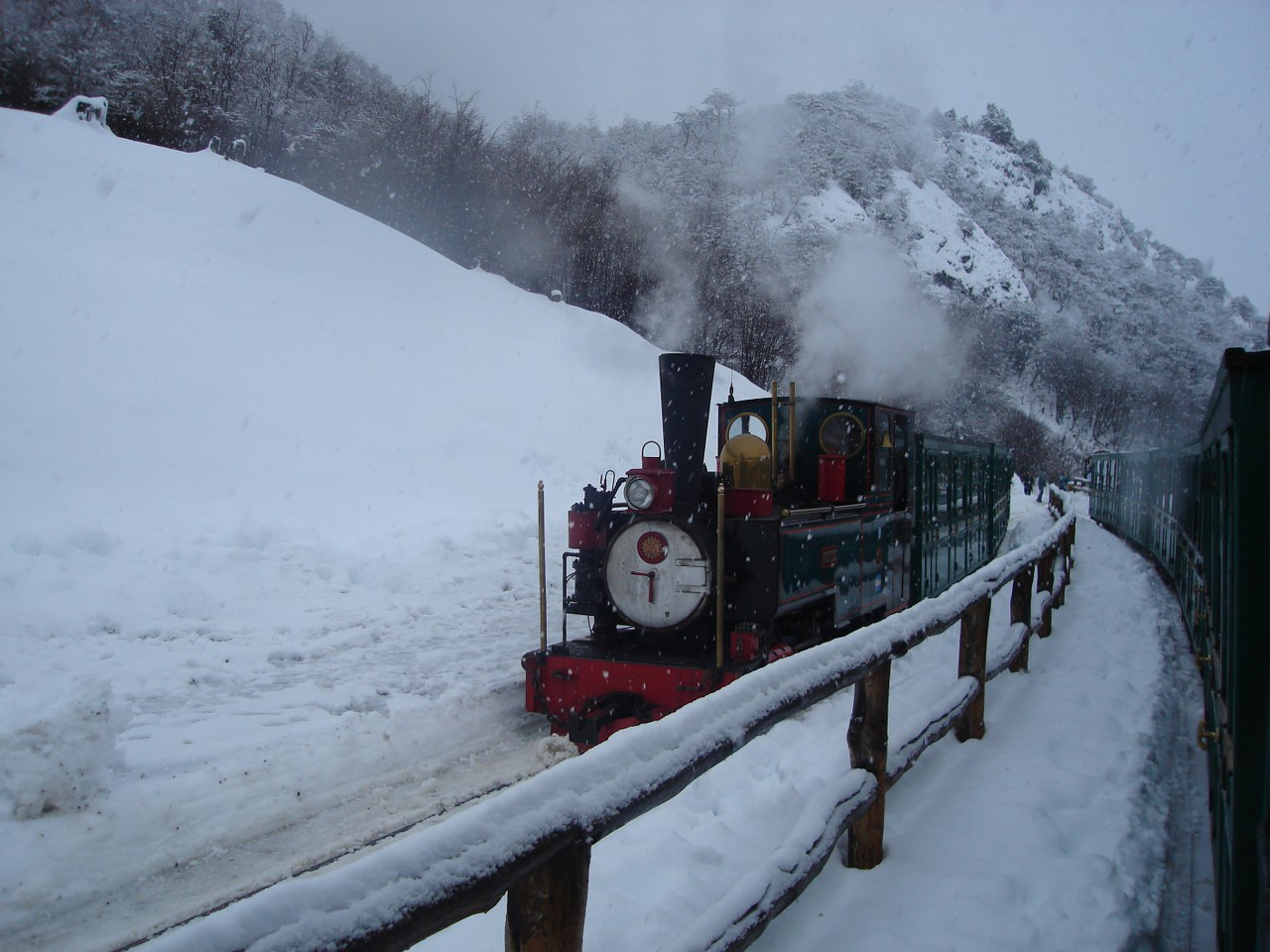
Southern Fuegian Railway

During 1873, Juan and Clara Lawrence, the first Argentine citizens to visit Ushuaia, arrived to teach school. That same year Julio Argentino Roca, who later served as Argentine President twice, promoted the establishment of a penal colony for re-offenders, modeled after one in Tasmania, Australia, in an effort to secure permanent residents from Argentina and to help establish Argentine sovereignty over all of Tierra del Fuego. But only after the Boundary Treaty of 1881 between Chile and Argentina did formal efforts get under way to establish the township and its prison.

During the 1880s, many gold prospectors came to Ushuaia following rumors of large gold fields, which proved to be false. On 12 October 1884, as part of the South Atlantic Expedition, Commodore Augusto Lasserre established the sub-division of Ushuaia, with the missionaries and naval officers signing the Act of Ceremony. Don Feliz M Paz was named Governor of Tierra del Fuego and in 1885 named Ushuaia as its capital. In 1885 the territory police was organized under Antonio A. Romero with headquarters also in Ushuaia. But it was not until 1904 that the Federal Government of Argentina recognized Ushuaia as the capital of Tierra del Fuego. The prison was formally announced in an executive order by the then-Acting President Roca in 1896.

Ushuaia suffered several epidemics, including typhus, pertussis, and measles, that much reduced the native population. But because the Yámana were not included in census data, the exact death toll is not known. The first census was held in 1893, which recorded 113 men and 36 women living in Ushuaia. By 1911 the Yámana had all practically disappeared, so the mission was closed. The population grew to 1,558 by the 1914 census.

In 1896 the prison received its first inmates, mainly re-offenders and dangerous prisoners transferred from Buenos Aires, but also some political prisoners. A separate military prison opened in 1903 at the nearby Puerto Golondrina. The two prisons merged in 1910, and that combined complex still stands today. Thus, during the first half of the 20th century, the city centered around the prison built by the Argentine government to increase the Argentine population and to ensure Argentine sovereignty over Tierra del Fuego. The prison followed the example of the British in Tasmania and the French in Devil's Island. Escape from Tierra del Fuego was similarly difficult, although two prisoners managed to escape into the surrounding area for a few weeks. The prison population thus became forced colonists and spent much of their time building the town with timber from the forest around the prison. They also built a railway to the settlement, now a tourist attraction known as the End of the World Train (Tren del Fin del Mundo), the southernmost railway in the world.

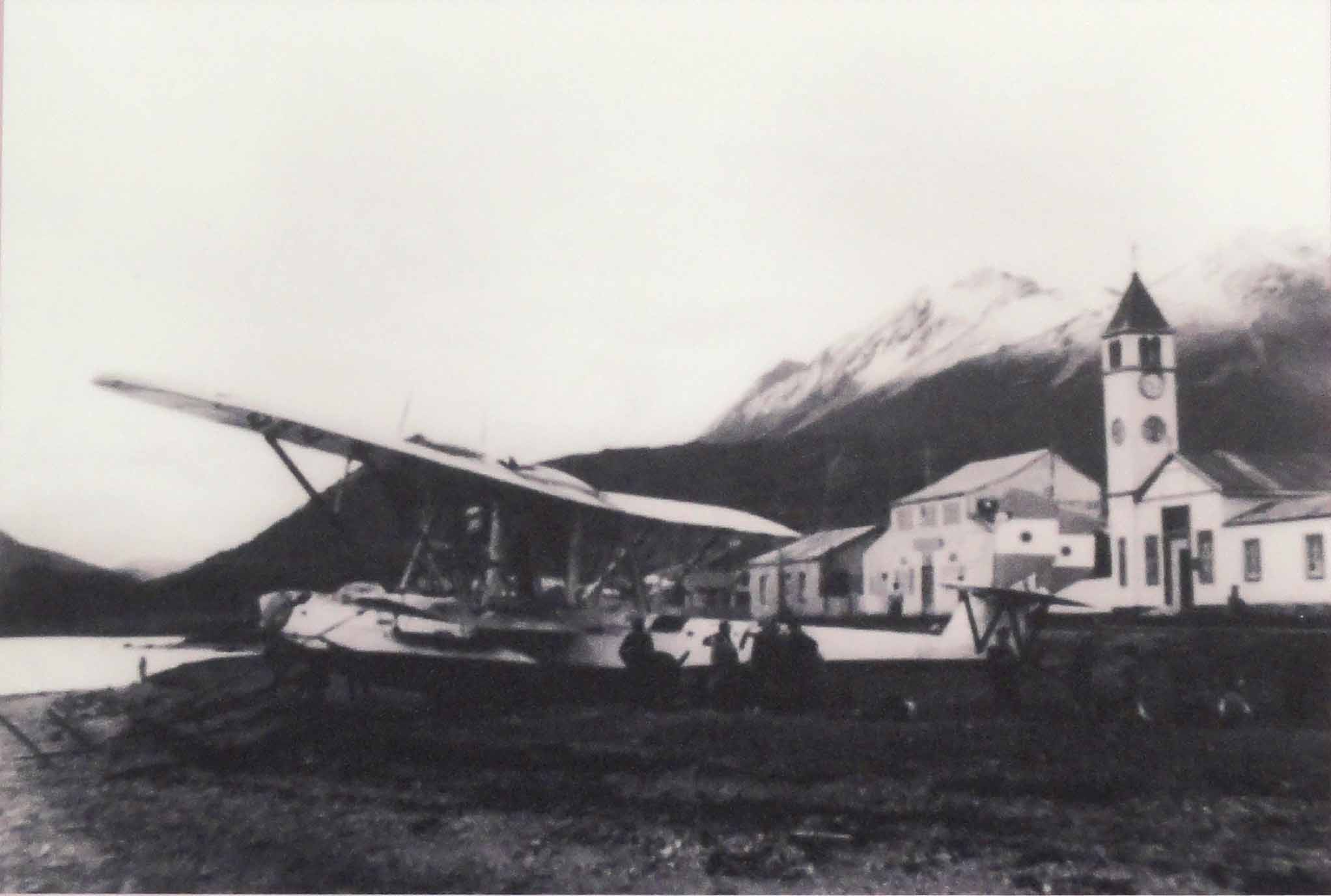
Argentine Navy seaplane, one of the first to arrive to Ushuaia in the 1930s

The prison operated until 1947, when President Juan Domingo Perón closed it by executive order in response to the many reports of abuse, unhealthy conditions, and unsafe practices. Most of the guards stayed in Ushuaia, while the prisoners were relocated to other jails farther north. After the prison closed, it became a part of the Ushuaia Naval Base, functioning as a storage and office facility until the early 1990s. Later it was converted into the current Museo Maritimo de Ushuaia.

The naval base at Ushuaia was active during the Falklands War of 1982. The Argentine cruiser ARA General Belgrano, subsequently sunk by the British Fleet, sailed from the Port of Ushuaia, where a memorial was erected in February 1996.

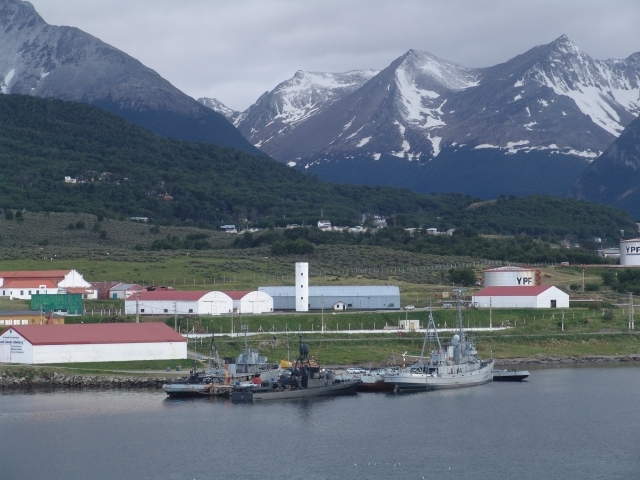
Argentine Navy ships in Ushuaia

This also led to violence in the 2014 Top Gear: Patagonia Special as the locals had taken offense to the license plate of the car driven by presenter Jeremy Clarkson, which read "H982 FKL". The protesters thought that the number plate was a direct reference to the Falklands War fought between Argentina and the United Kingdom, and that it was a fake, deliberately designed for this specific trip to their country. The show's producers attempted to negotiate with Argentinian officials saying that the number plate was not fake (something that was later proven to be correct). Negotiations between the show's producers and officials representing the protesters were unsuccessful, and the production crew were ordered by the officials to leave the Tierra del Fuego area immediately.

== Geography ==
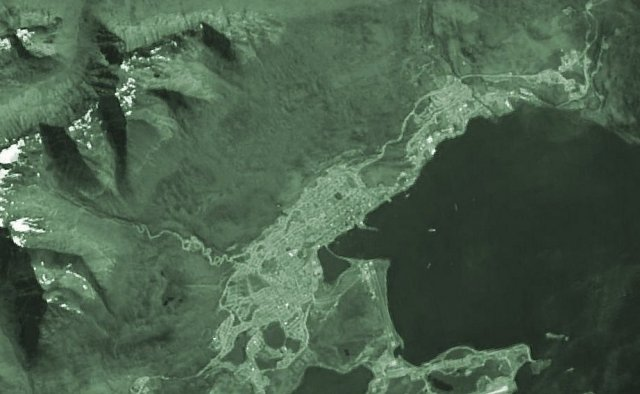
Satellite view of Ushuaia and its bay

=== Physical geography ===
==== Location ====
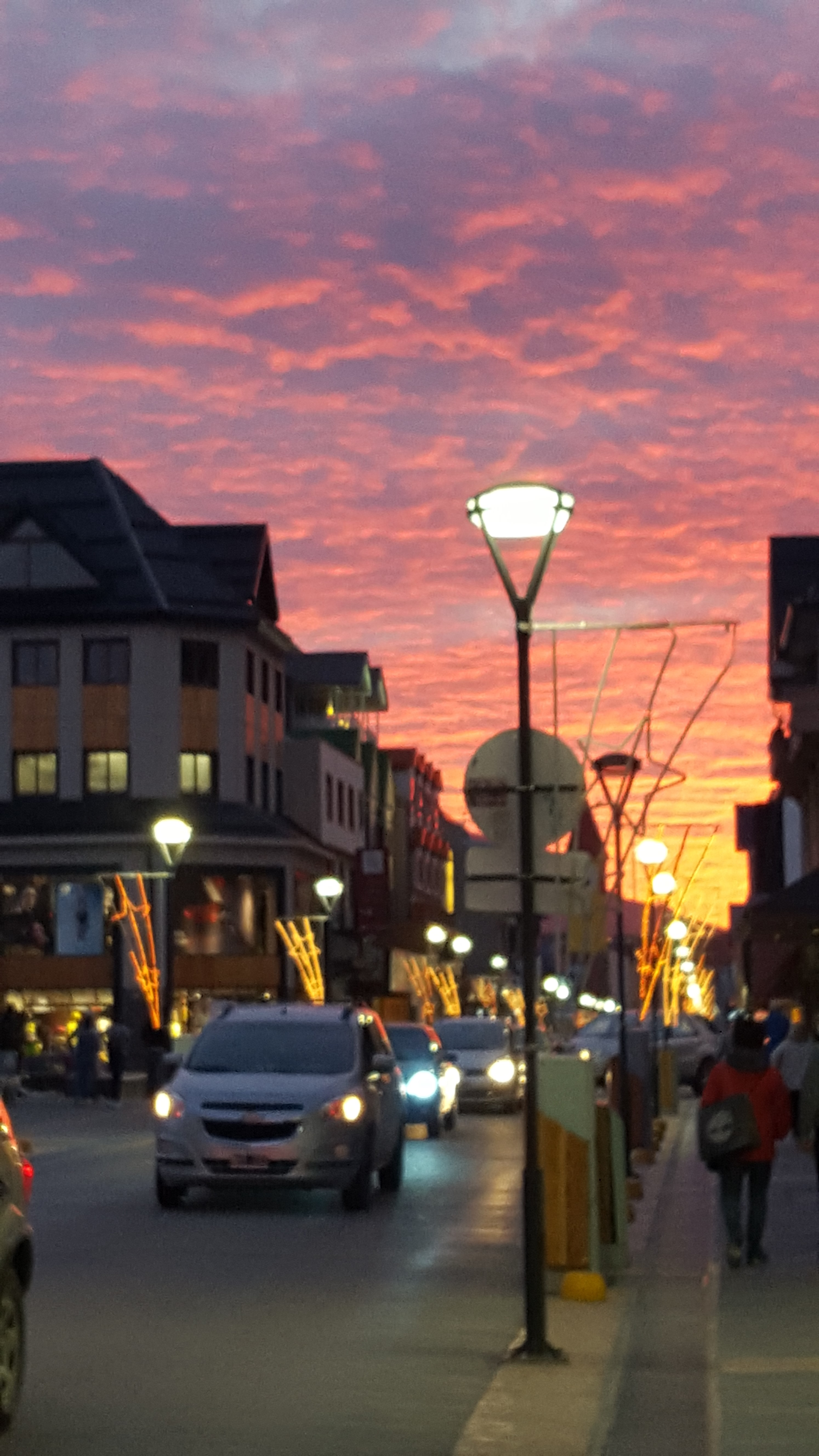
Downtown Ushuaia in the evening

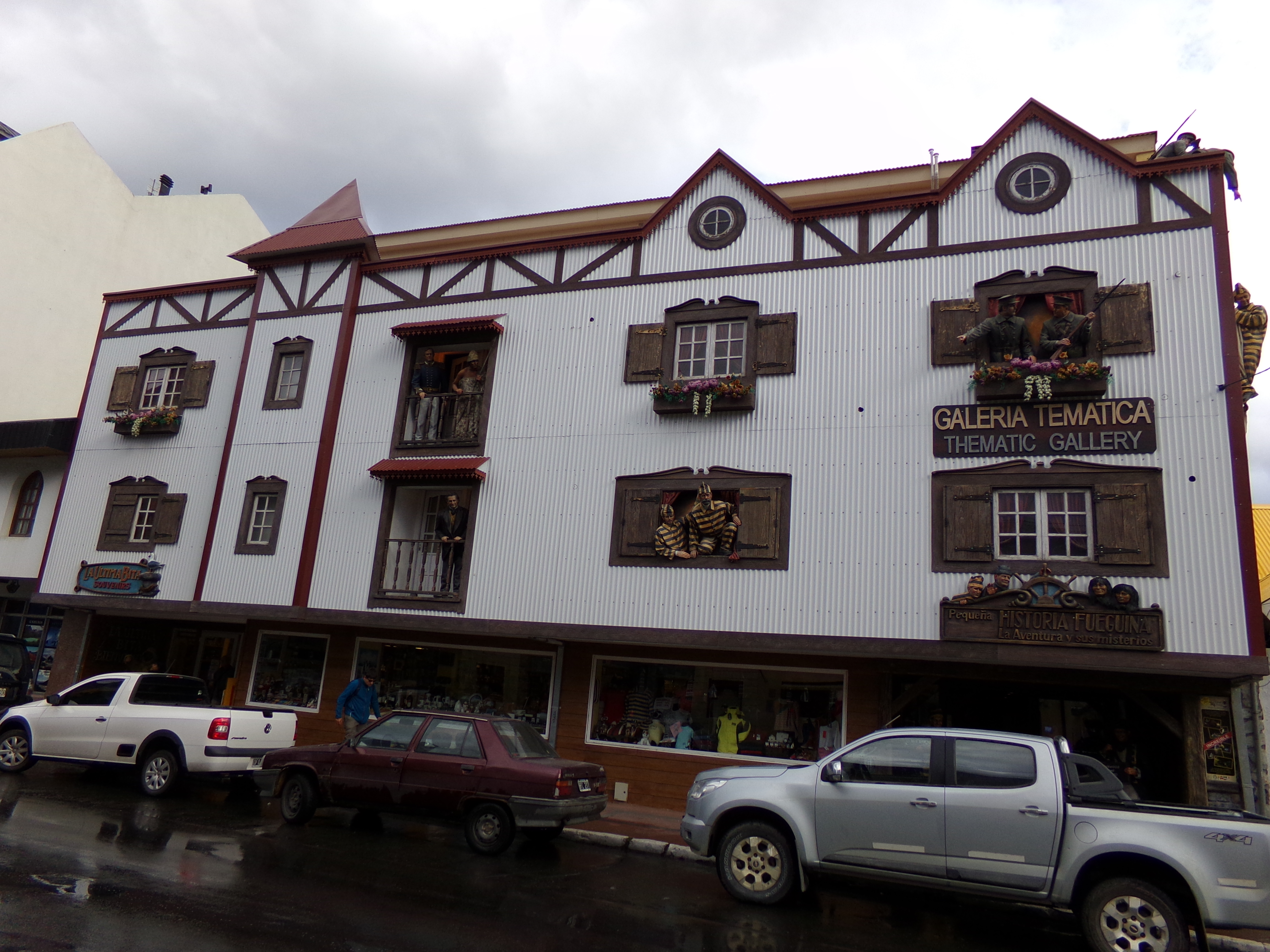
Thematic Gallery Ushuaia.

Ushuaia is located on Ushuaia Bay at 6 meters (20 ft) above sea level, surrounded to the west, north, and east by the Andes Fueguinos. It is the only city accessed from the rest of the country by crossing part of the Andes mountain range, which runs along the southern edge of Tierra del Fuego. National Route 3 crosses the Sierra Alvear through the Garibaldi Pass to enter the Carabajal Valley, where it follows the Olivia River through the Sierra Sorondo to the Beagle Channel and Ushuaia Bay. For this reason, it is considered the only trans-Andean city (ciudad trasandina) in Argentina.

Ushuaia has long been described as the southernmost city in the world. While there are settlements farther south, the only one of any notable size is Puerto Williams, a Chilean settlement of some 2,000 residents. As a center of population, commerce, and culture, and as a town of significant size and importance, Ushuaia, however, clearly qualifies as a city. A 1998 article in the newspaper Clarín reported that the designation "southernmost city in the world" had been transferred to Puerto Williams by a joint committee from Argentina and Chile, but this was denied by Argentine authorities, and the Secretariat of Tourism of Argentina continues to use the slogan in official documentation and websites.

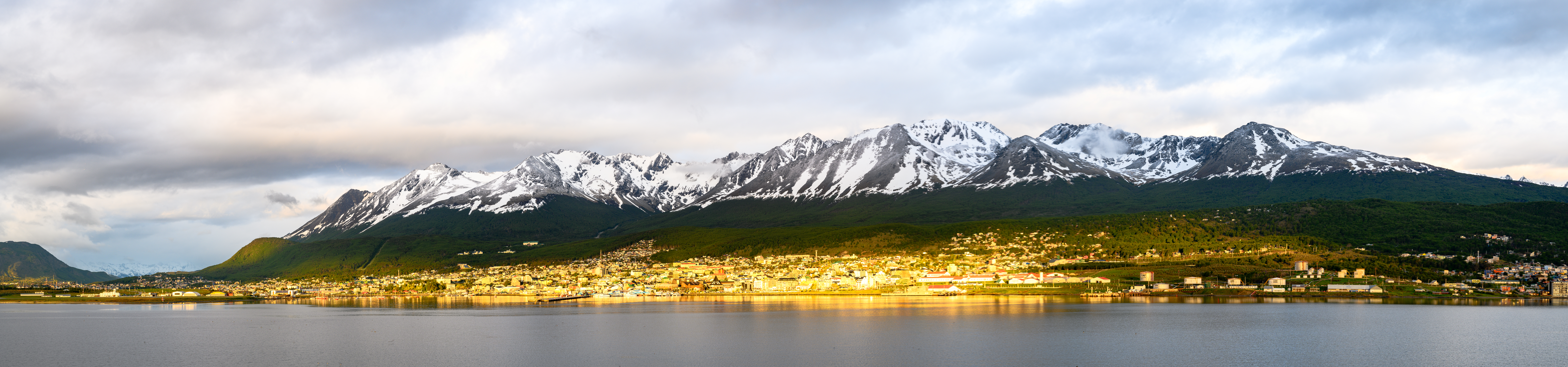
Panorama of Ushuaia

==== Surrounding mountains ====
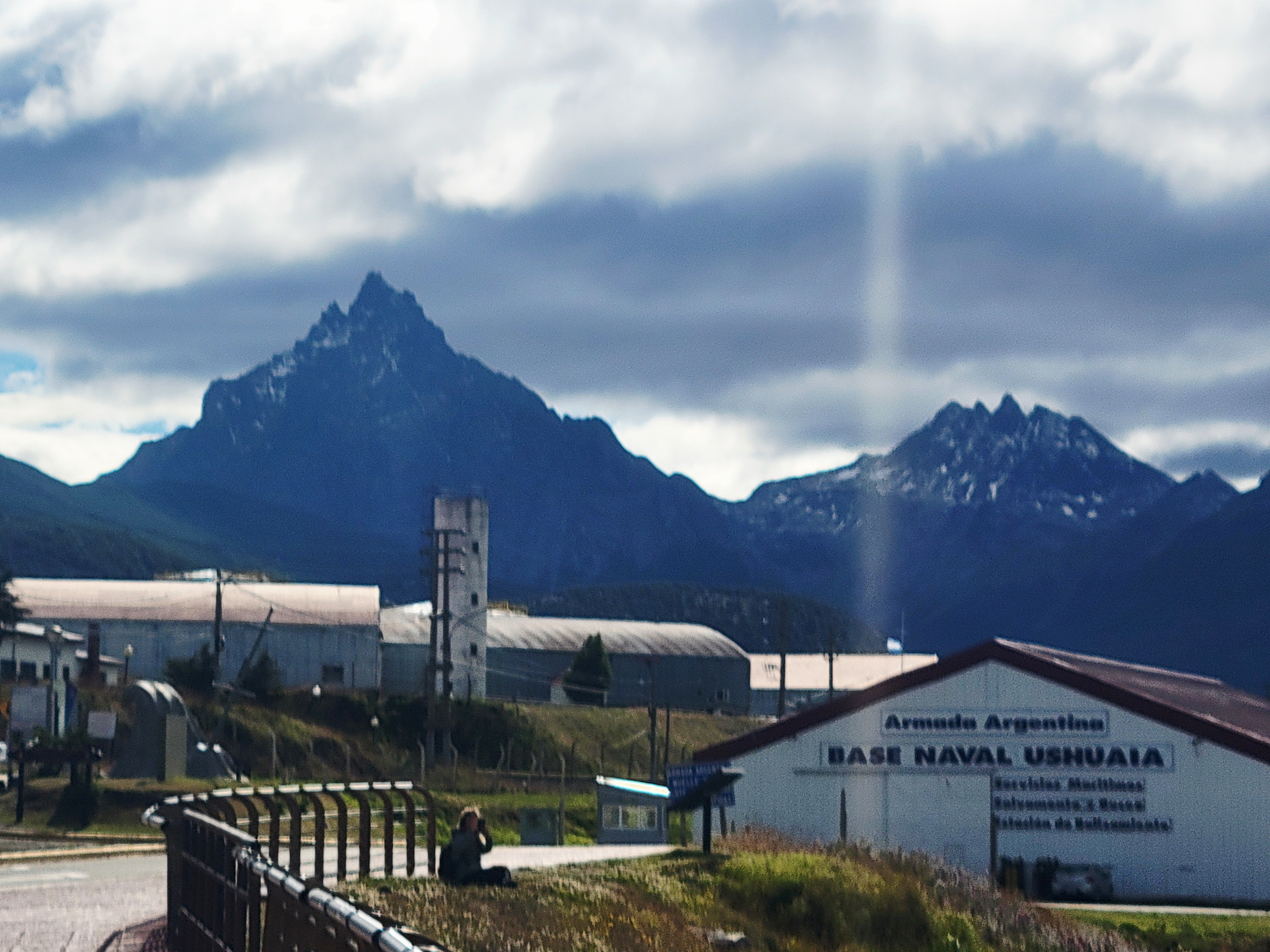
Monte Olivia and Cerro Cinco Hermanos from the Ushuaia waterfront.

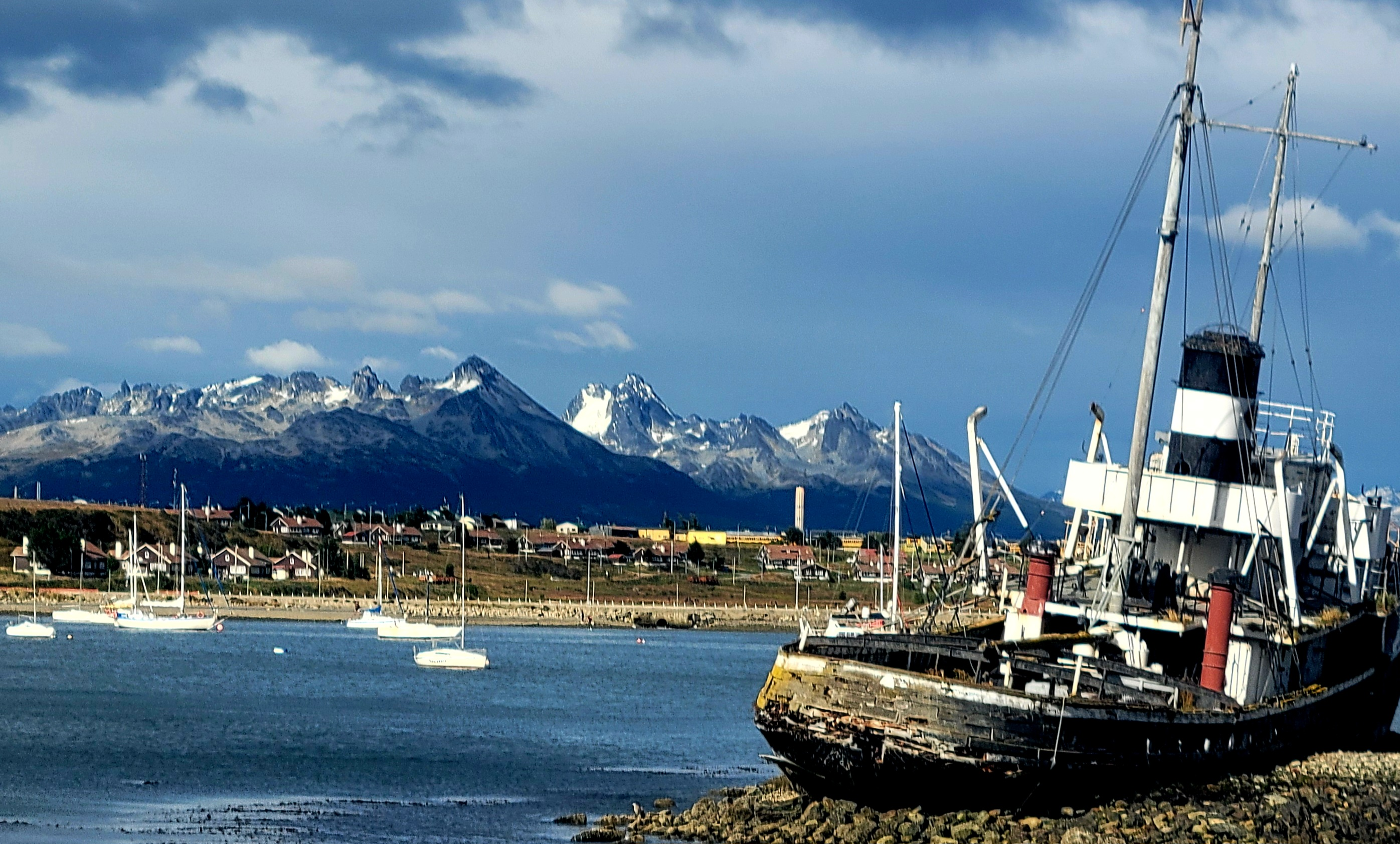
Peaks on the Pensinsula Dumas on Hoste Island from the Ushuaia waterfront.

The view to the northeast is dominated by Monte Olivia and Cerro Cinco Hermanos; to the northwest is Cerro Maritial on a ridge that holds the small Martial glacier. To the southwest, across the Beagle Channel, peaks on the Peninsula Dumas on Hoste Island are prominent.

==== Climate ====
Ushuaia features a significantly ocean-moderated mild tundra climate (Köppen: ET, bordering on Cfc; Trewartha: Ftkk), with cool, but not cold, conditions throughout the year (average temperature remains above 0 °C and below 10 °C year round). Vegetation around the city thus does not resemble typical tundra but is instead heavily forested. Temperatures at the Ushuaia – Malvinas Argentinas International Airport average 1.3 °C (34.3 °F) in the coolest month (July), and 9.7 °C (49.5 °F) in the warmest month (January). The record low is −21.0 °C (−5.8 °F) in July, and the record high is 29.5 °C (85.1 °F) in January. On average, the city experiences 146 days of precipitation a year, with many cloudy and foggy days, averaging 206 cloudy days a year. This results in Ushuaia receiving an average of 3.93 hours of sunshine per day (an annual total of 1,434 hours) or about 30.2% of possible sunshine. Despite receiving only 529.7 millimetres (21 in) average annual precipitation, Ushuaia is very humid, with an average humidity of 77%.

Summers tend to be cloudy and windy, with maximum temperatures averaging around 14 °C (57 °F) during the day and about 5 °C (41 °F) at night. Temperatures of 20 °C (68 °F) or more occur only on a handful of days, and night frost is always possible, as well as days below 10.0 °C (50 °F). Temperatures gradually diminish during the autumn, to reach maximum temperatures of about 4.5 °C (40 °F) and minimum temperatures of −1.4 °C (29 °F) in winter, with frequent snow, sleet and rain showers. Some winters may bring extended periods of frost and snow with a perpetual snow cover, whereas other winters might just bring snowstorms followed by thaws. Temperatures then very slowly recover during the spring, but snow showers and frost are a common occurrence until the beginning of the summer in December, and they might occur even in midsummer. Frost is common in any month.

The southwestern winds make the outer islands wetter, reaching 1,400 mm (55 in) at Isla de los Estados (Island of the States). Because temperatures are cool throughout the year, there is little evaporation. Snow is common in winter and regularly occurs throughout the year. Ushuaia occasionally experiences snow in summer (from November to March). Due to its high southern latitude, the city's climate is influenced by Antarctica. The duration of daylight varies from more than 17 hours in summer to just over 7 hours in winter.

Climate data for Ushuaia Airport (1991–2020, extremes 1901–present) (Note: The record highs and lows are based on the Secretaria de Mineria link for the period 1901–1990 while records beyond 1990 come from the Servicio Meteorológico Nacional link since it only covers from 1961–present. When these two sources are used together, the record highs and lows are from the period 1901–present)
Month	Jan	Feb	Mar	Apr	May	Jun	Jul	Aug	Sep	Oct	Nov	Dec	Year
Record high °C (°F)	29.5 (85.1)	28.9 (84.0)	25.6 (78.1)	22.2 (72.0)	20.3 (68.5)	19.0 (66.2)	17.5 (63.5)	18.0 (64.4)	22.3 (72.1)	23.7 (74.7)	26.3 (79.3)	29.0 (84.2)	29.5 (85.1)
Mean daily maximum °C (°F)	13.6 (56.5)	13.6 (56.5)	12.2 (54.0)	9.4 (48.9)	6.9 (44.4)	4.5 (40.1)	4.6 (40.3)	5.7 (42.3)	7.6 (45.7)	10.1 (50.2)	11.5 (52.7)	12.5 (54.5)	9.4 (48.9)
Daily mean °C (°F)	9.5 (49.1)	9.4 (48.9)	8.4 (47.1)	6.2 (43.2)	4.3 (39.7)	2.5 (36.5)	2.3 (36.1)	2.9 (37.2)	4.3 (39.7)	6.2 (43.2)	7.4 (45.3)	8.6 (47.5)	6.0 (42.8)
Mean daily minimum °C (°F)	5.4 (41.7)	5.2 (41.4)	4.6 (40.3)	3.0 (37.4)	1.7 (35.1)	0.5 (32.9)	0.2 (32.4)	0.1 (32.2)	1.0 (33.8)	2.3 (36.1)	3.3 (37.9)	4.7 (40.5)	2.7 (36.9)
Record low °C (°F)	−2.0 (28.4)	−4.0 (24.8)	−4.3 (24.3)	−7.3 (18.9)	−20.2 (−4.4)	−18.2 (−0.8)	−21.0 (−5.8)	−19.6 (−3.3)	−10.6 (12.9)	−6.1 (21.0)	−6.0 (21.2)	−3.7 (25.3)	−21.0 (−5.8)
Average precipitation mm (inches)	45.1 (1.78)	34.6 (1.36)	38.3 (1.51)	47.0 (1.85)	35.3 (1.39)	42.5 (1.67)	35.8 (1.41)	38.4 (1.51)	30.5 (1.20)	28.4 (1.12)	38.9 (1.53)	43.0 (1.69)	457.8 (18.02)
Average precipitation days (≥ 0.1 mm)	16.3	13.3	15.1	15.5	13.5	14.7	15.1	14.4	12.6	13.0	15.5	16.4	175.4
Average snowy days	0.2	0.3	1.0	4.3	4.8	9.3	10.6	10.2	7.7	5.5	4.4	1.4	59.5
Average relative humidity (%)	71.1	73.0	74.2	77.1	78.5	81.0	79.5	77.0	74.5	70.1	70.7	70.8	74.8
Mean monthly sunshine hours	164.3	146.9	127.1	96.0	77.5	45.0	58.9	93.0	126.0	155.0	159.0	155.0	1,403.7
Mean daily sunshine hours	5.3	5.2	4.1	3.2	2.5	1.5	1.9	3.0	4.2	5.0	5.3	5.0	3.9
Percentage possible sunshine	32.0	34.5	33.5	31.5	25.7	18.5	22.5	27.5	34.0	37.5	37.0	28.5	30.2
Average ultraviolet index	8	6	4	2	1	1	1	1	2	4	6	8	4
Source 1: Servicio Meteorológico Nacional (extremes 1961–present) (UV 1998-2001; 2004-2006; 2008-2019)
Source 2: Secretaria de Mineria (extremes and percent sun, 1901–1990)

=== Flora ===
Ushuaia is surrounded by Magellanic subpolar forests. On the hills around the town, the following indigenous trees are found: Drimys winteri (winter's bark), Maytenus magellanica (hard-log mayten) and several species of Nothofagus (southern beech). Trees in Ushuaia tend to follow the wind direction, and are therefore called "flag-trees" for their uni-directional growth pattern. "Originally this life form was considered genetically determined [Holtmeier, 1981] but the term was subsequently used to designate all genetically or environmentally determined stunted and dwarf trees at the timberland."

== Economy ==
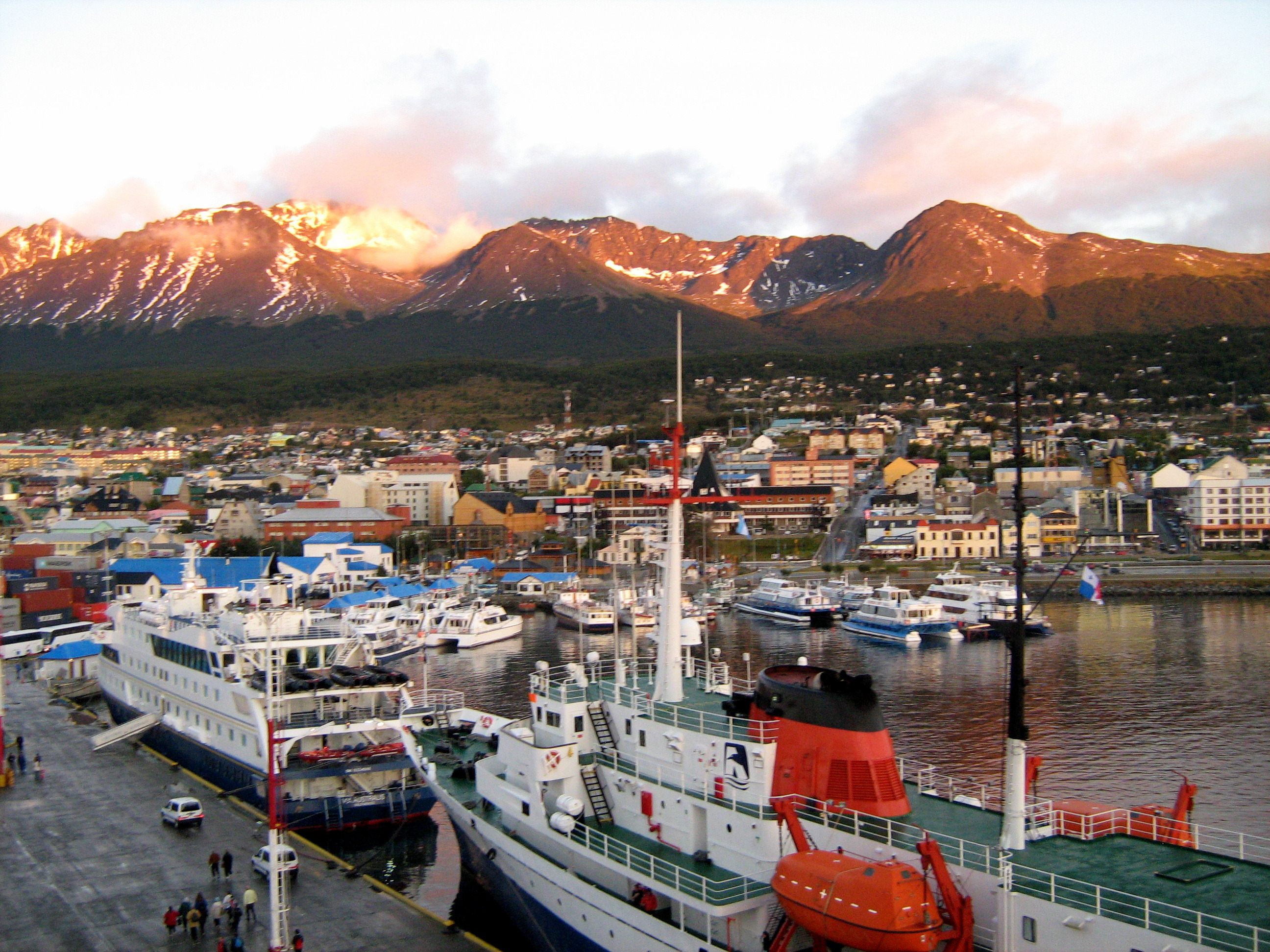
View of the port

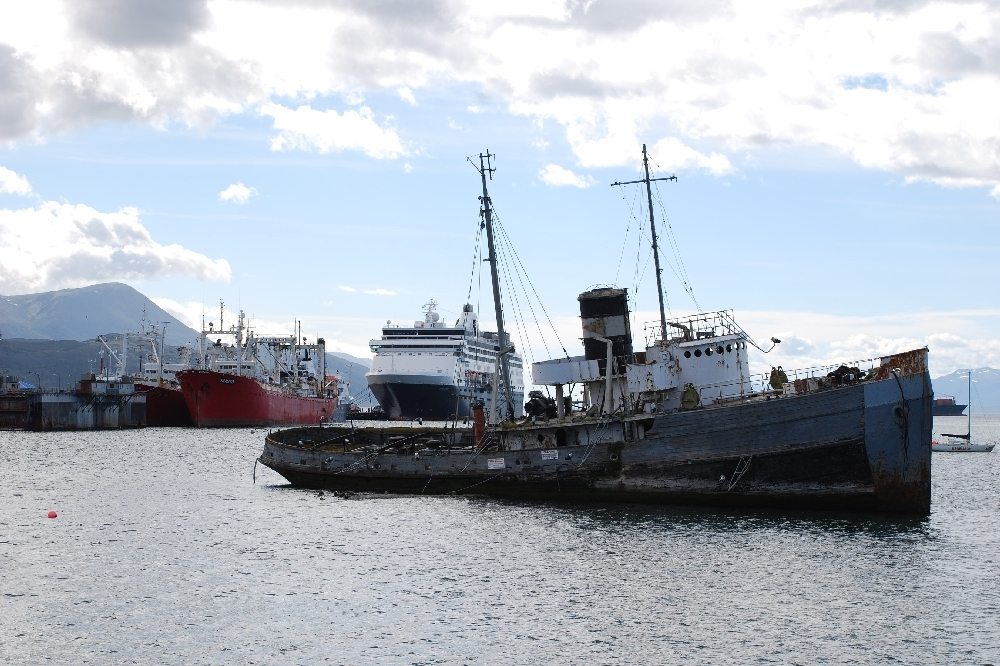
Ushuaia Harbor

The main economic activities are fishing, natural gas and oil extraction, sheep farming and ecotourism.

=== Tourism ===
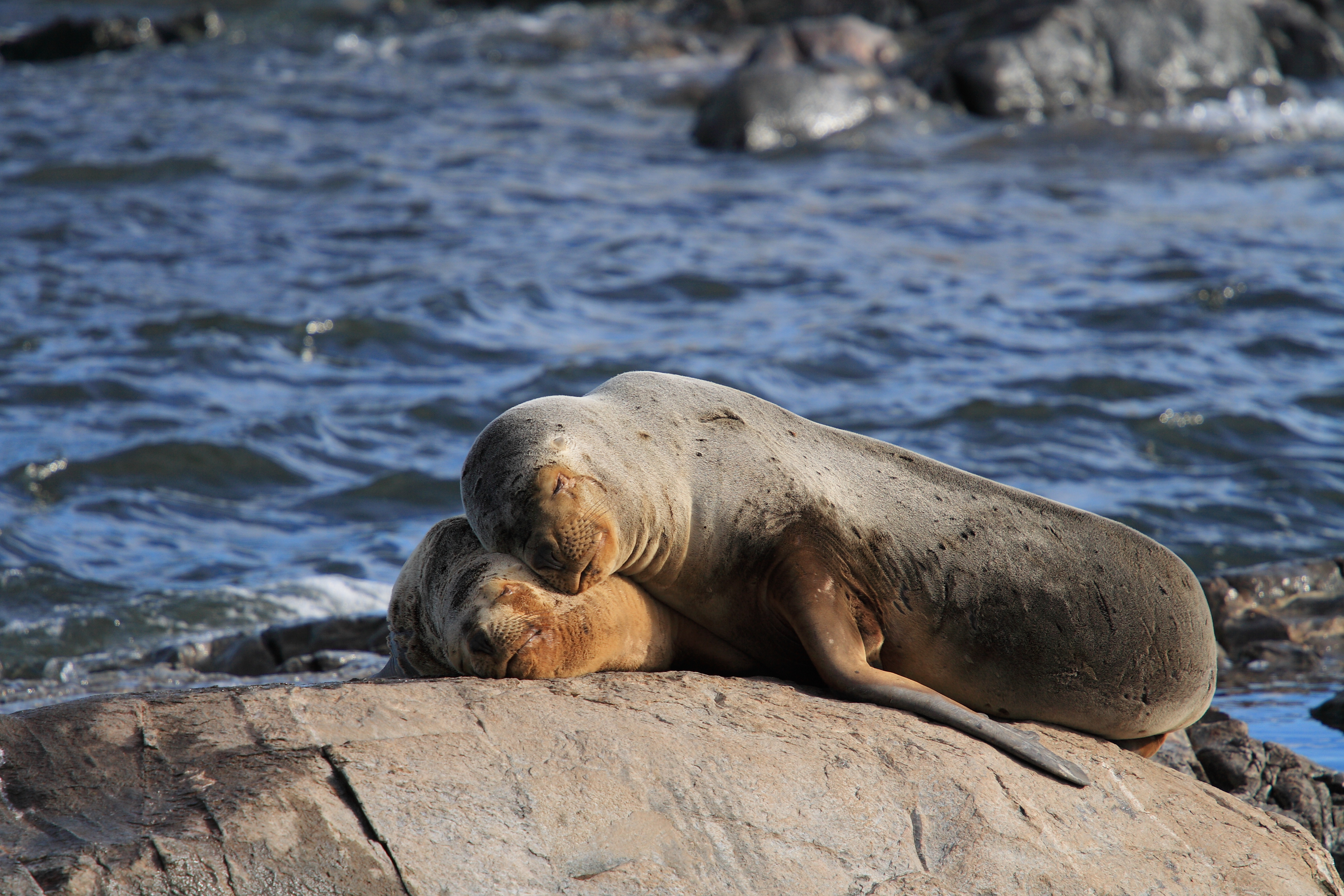
Female sea lion and her pup

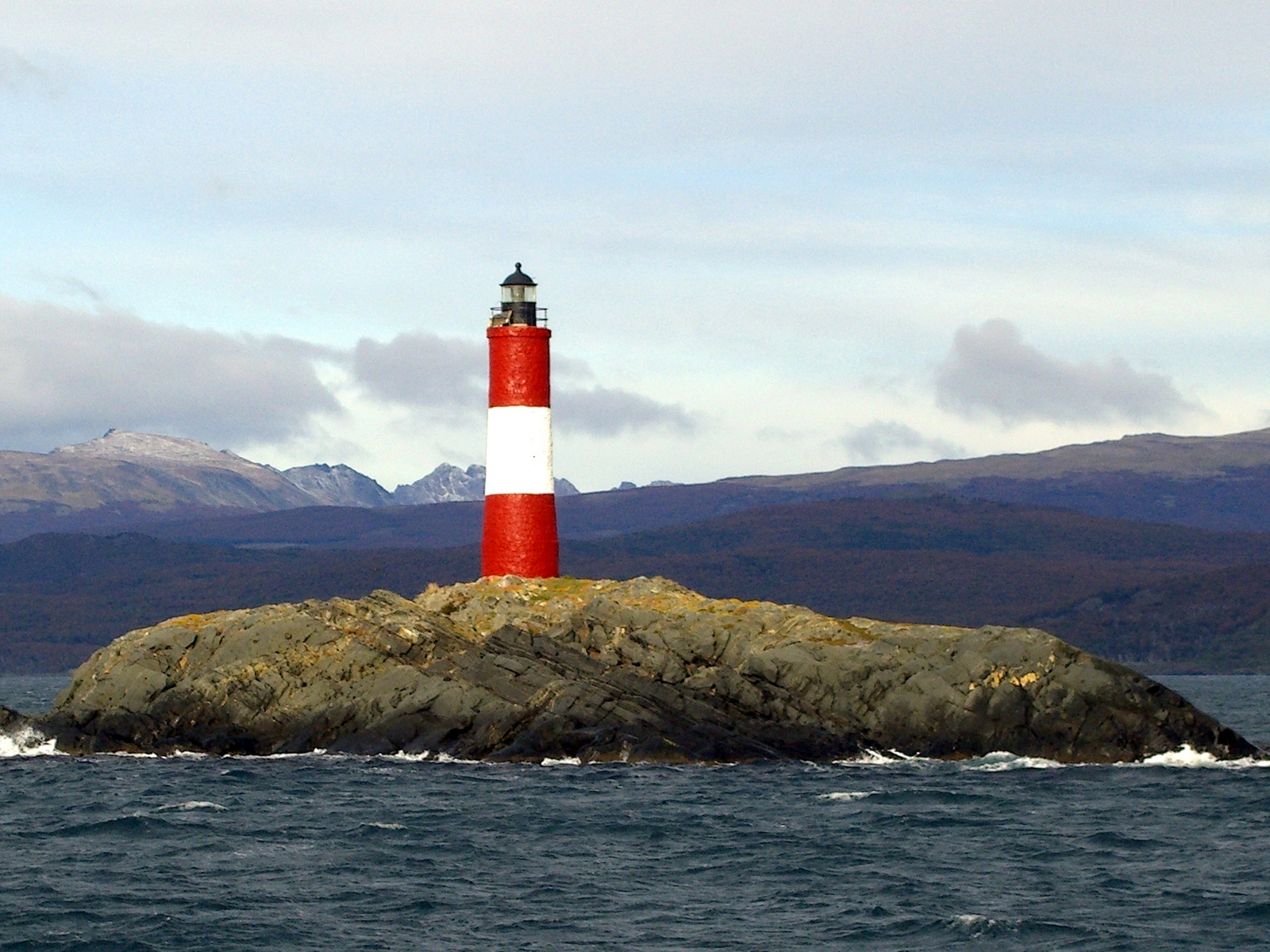
Les Eclaireurs Lighthouse, located in Ushuaia

Tourist attractions include the Tierra del Fuego National Park and Lapataia Bay. The park can be reached by highway, or via the End of the World Train (Tren del Fin del Mundo) from Ushuaia. The city has a museum of Yámana, English, and Argentine settlement, including its years as a prison colony. Wildlife attractions include local birds, penguins, seals and orcas, many of these species colonizing islands in the Beagle Channel. There are daily bus and boat tours to Harberton, the Bridges family compound, Estancia Harberton. Tours also visit the Les Eclaireurs Lighthouse. Les Eclaireurs is sometimes confused with the "Lighthouse at the End of the World" (faro del fin del mundo) made famous by Jules Verne in the novel of the same name; but the latter lies some 200 mi (320 km) east of Ushuaia on Isla de los Estados (Island of the States).

=== Manufacturing ===
Ushuaia's industrial sector, led by the Grundig Renacer electronics factory, is among the largest in Patagonia.

== Arts and culture ==
Since 2007 Ushuaia has hosted the Bienal de Arte Contemporáneo del Fin del Mundo (Biennial of Contemporary Art at the End of the World), created and organized by the Patagonia Arte & Desafío Foundation under the rubric "South Pole of the Arts, Sciences, and Ecology". The Bienal has gathered over one hundred artists from five continents addressing the motto "think at the End of the World that another world is possible". As a pedagogical project it encourages students at all levels to "think about a better world".

== Sports ==
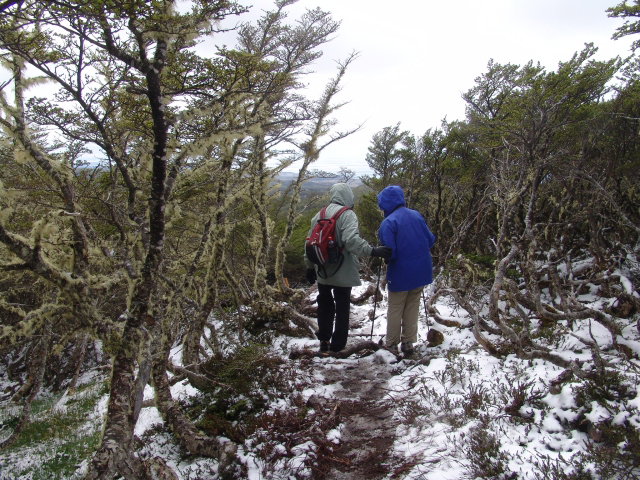
Trekking in the Andean Club

As in most of Argentina, football is a popular sport in Ushuaia, and in 2010 the TV show FIFA Futbol Mundial did a story about the sport's development in this locality. In 2015 Ushuaia hosted the first PATHF Snow Handball Panamerican Championship.

=== Ice hockey ===
A popular sport in Ushuaia is ice hockey, and low temperatures all year long make the city a perfect spot for practicing it outdoors. In 2010 the city opened an outdoor short track and ice hockey Olympic-size ice rink (30 by 60 metres, 98 by 197 ft), the first of its kind in South America. After this Argentina became the first South American nation to be upgraded from affiliate to associate member status of the International Ice Hockey Federation (IIHF).

Since 2005 the Municipality of Ushuaia and the Argentinean Ice Hockey Federation (FAHH) organize the yearly End of the World Cup (Copa del Fin del Mundo) that has gathered ice hockey teams from Ushuaia, Buenos Aires, Punta Arenas and São Paulo and includes seven different competitions: one for men, one for women, four junior categories and an international tournament.

Beside the local league and the Copa del Fin del Mundo, in 2016 the city hosted the first ice hockey Patagonian Championship, with teams from Ushuaia, Río Grande and Punta Arenas. After the tournament a new plan to build a roof over the ice rink was announced. Ushuaia has two rival teams: Club Andino de Ushuaia (CAU) and Los Ñires.

=== Skiing ===
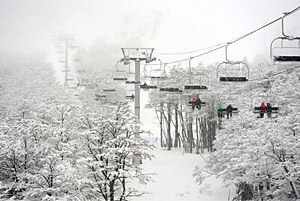
Cerro Castor Ski Resort

Several ski areas are located near Ushuaia, including Glacier El Martial (on Martial Mountains) and Cerro Castor. Opened in 1999, Cerro Castor is the southernmost full-fledged ski resort in the world. On Cerro Castor, it is possible to ski just 200 metres (660 feet) above sea level. The summit reaches an elevation of 1,003 metres (3,291 feet) above sea level, and consistently cool temperatures allow the longest skiing season in South America. Winter temperatures fluctuate from 0 to −5 °C (32 to 23 °F). It has ten elevation facilities and 28 ski trails for all skill levels. There are cafeterias, mountain huts, a ski school, a first aid room and a forest of beech. Snowboarding, sledding, and snowshoeing are also available at Cerro Castor, in addition to alpine skiing. It is located on the southern side of Cerro Krund, 27 kilometres (17 miles) north of Ushuaia. The ski season is typically between June through October. In 2012 Cerro Castor hosted the FIS Freestyle Slopestyle World Cup, organized by the International Ski Federation (FIS), and in 2015 it hosted the Interski Congress and World Cup, organized by the International Ski Instructors Association, which was its first ever event in the Southern Hemisphere.

The glacier is popular even during the summer months, when the chairlift operates in both directions. Hiking trails lead from the city's edge to the base of the glacier, which has retreated considerably over the past century, as shown in photographs on display at the Antarctic Museum of Ushuaia.

The Valley of Tierra Mayor and the Francisco Jerman Nordic Ski Area, located 20 km and 5 km away from Ushuaia respectively, are popular cross-country venues. Since 1986 Tierra Mayor hosts the annual Marchablanca, a 21 km traditional race organized by the Club Andino Ushuaia, and the Ushuaia Loppet, a full distance marathon that is one of the 20 members of the Worldloppet Ski Federation. Usually this race starts the Federation's Marathon Series in August.

In October 2014 the Argentine Olympic Committee (COA) revealed the plan to use the 2018 Summer Youth Olympics, to be held in Buenos Aires, as the launchpad for a bid in the near future. The Committee identified Argentina's south-eastern region of Patagonia, which comprises the southern section of the Andes mountains, as a possible location to host the Winter Games. In 2010 it was suggested that Ushuaia would be the main option for a bid. Before the 2018 Summer Youth Olympics, International Olympic Committee President Thomas Bach visited Ushuaia and talked about the possibility of holding the 2024 Winter Youth Olympics there.

== Education ==
Ushuaia has twelve secondary schools, four of which also provide adult education. The Colegio Nacional de Ushuaia is one of the newest schools in the city and was modeled after the Colegio Nacional de Buenos Aires. Another important secondary school is Colegio Diocesano Monseñor Miguel Ángel Alemán, which takes its name from the monsignor of the same name.

The National University of Patagonia San Juan Bosco operates a campus in Ushuaia, with Faculties of Engineering, Economics and Humanities, and Social Sciences.

The National University of Tierra del Fuego, inaugurated in 2010, has its headquarters in Ushuaia.

== Media ==
=== Television ===
Ushuaia has two television stations: Channel 11 and Channel 13.

=== Newspapers ===
There are two main newspapers: El Diario del Fin del Mundo and El Diario La Prensa, as well as several other minor publications.

=== Radio ===
Notable broadcast radio stations in and around the territory include LRA 10 Radio Nacional Ushuaia e Islas Malvinas, FM Master's 107.3, FM del Pueblo 94.5, Radio Estación del Siglo, Radio Fueguina's FM 96.9, and LRF 780 Radio Argentina.

=== Stamps ===
The port of Ushuaia is depicted on a postage stamp released by Correo Argentino in January 2023. The stamp, denominated at 1,000 Argentine pesos, is the highest value in the National Parks series.

== Transportation ==
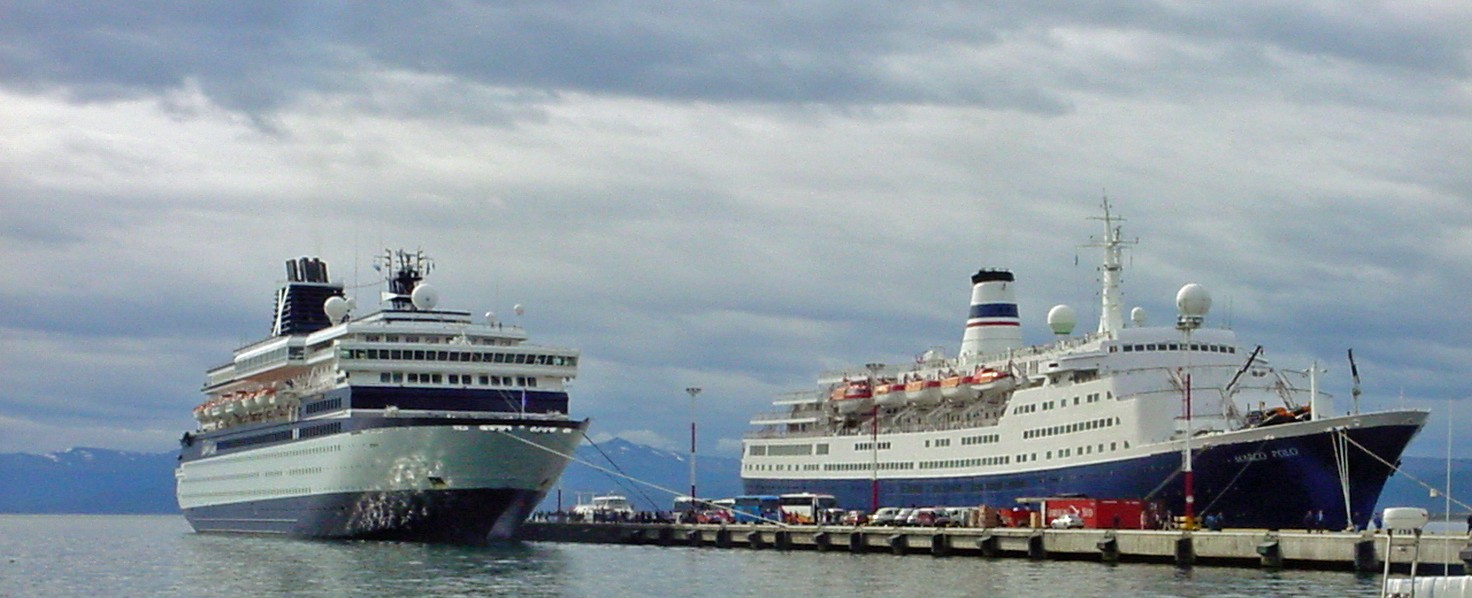
Celebrity Cruises's MV Zenith and Orient Lines's MS Marco Polo cruise ships at Ushuaia

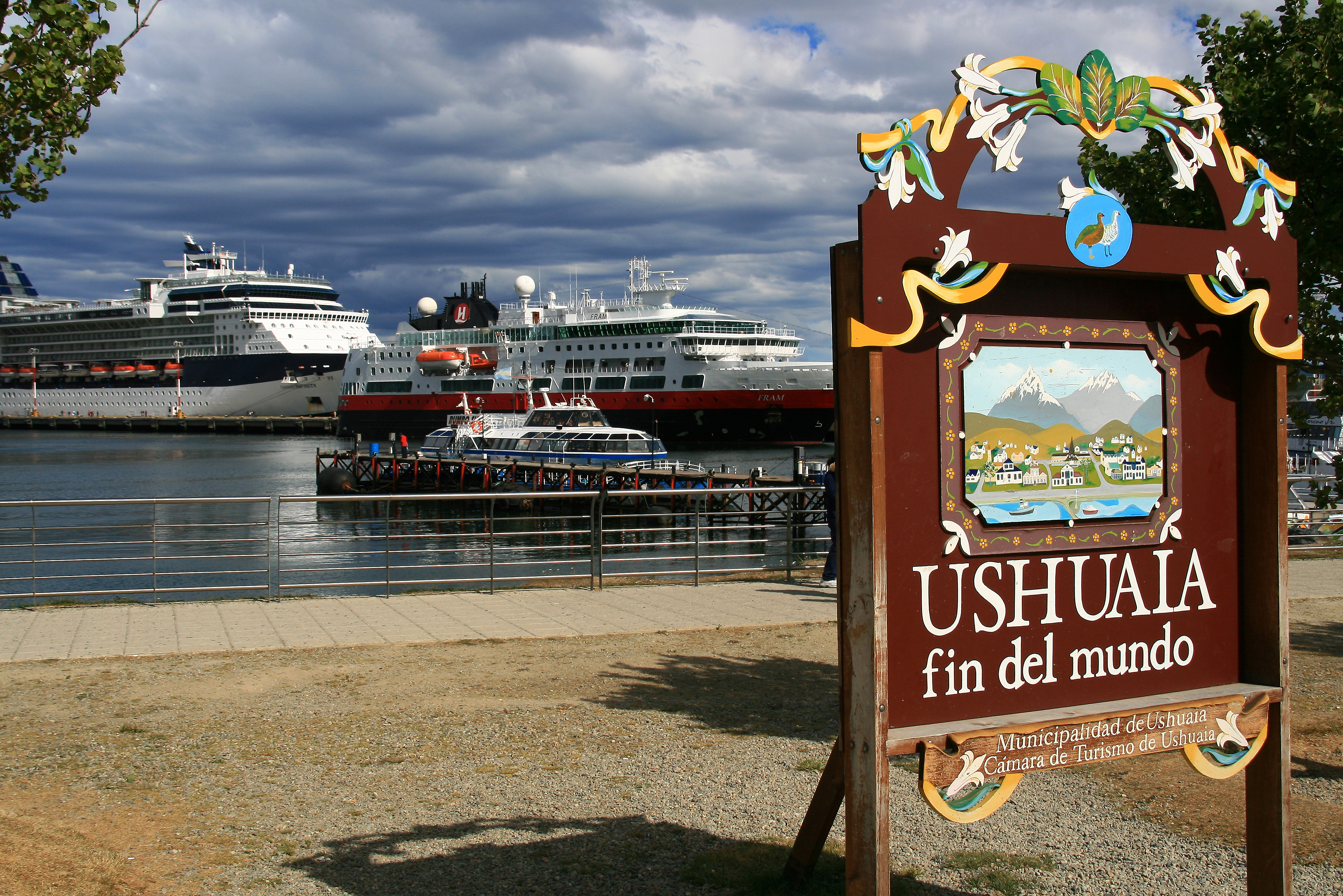

=== Air ===
Ushuaia receives regular flights at Ushuaia – Malvinas Argentinas International Airport from El Calafate, Buenos Aires and Santiago, Chile.

=== Sea ===
In addition to being a vacation destination for local and international tourists, Ushuaia is also the key access point to the Southern Ocean, including subantarctic islands such as the Falkland Islands, South Georgia and the South Sandwich Islands, and to Antarctic islands such as the South Orkney Islands and the South Shetland Islands. Its commercial pier is the major port of departure in the world for tourist and scientific expeditions to the Antarctic Peninsula. Several cruise and freight lines also provide transportation between Ushuaia and Valparaíso, Punta Arenas, Buenos Aires, and local seaports and settlements.

=== Road ===
The south terminus of the Pan-American Highway, which is also the south end of Argentina National Route 3, is located in Tierra del Fuego National Park.

== Health care ==
Located at the corner of Avenida 12 de Octubre and Maipú, the Hospital Gobernador Ernesto M. Campos is one of the two main health care centers in Ushuaia; the other one is private and it is called Clínica San Jorge.

== Filmography ==
Ushuaïa, le magazine de l'Extrême was the name of a television program, presented by Nicolas Hulot and broadcast on the French TV channel TF1 from September 1987 to June 1995. The show is known in English as Ushuaia: The Ultimate Adventure, and this language's version was hosted by Perri Peltz and was shown on NBC, CNBC, and international affiliates of the Discovery Channel. The city was also featured on the American CBS reality television show The Amazing Race in the fourth leg of season 11.

In 2014, BBC car program Top Gear visited Ushuaia at the conclusion of their "Patagonia Special", with the intent of constructing a stadium and playing a game of car football there. Before they could do so, however, they were chased out of the city (and subsequently across the border into Chile) by mobs of people angered by an apparent reference to the Falklands War encoded in the registration plate of presenter Jeremy Clarkson's vehicle (H982 FKL).

The summit of Cerro Alarkén served as the finishing line for the second series of the BBC program Race Across the World in 2020.

Several scenes in the 2015 film The Revenant, directed by Alejandro González Iñárritu, were shot in Ushuaia from July through November 2014.

The Apple TV+ original television series Long Way Up started its journey in Ushuaia.

== Sister cities ==
Ushuaia is twinned with:

Eilat, Israel

== Gallery ==
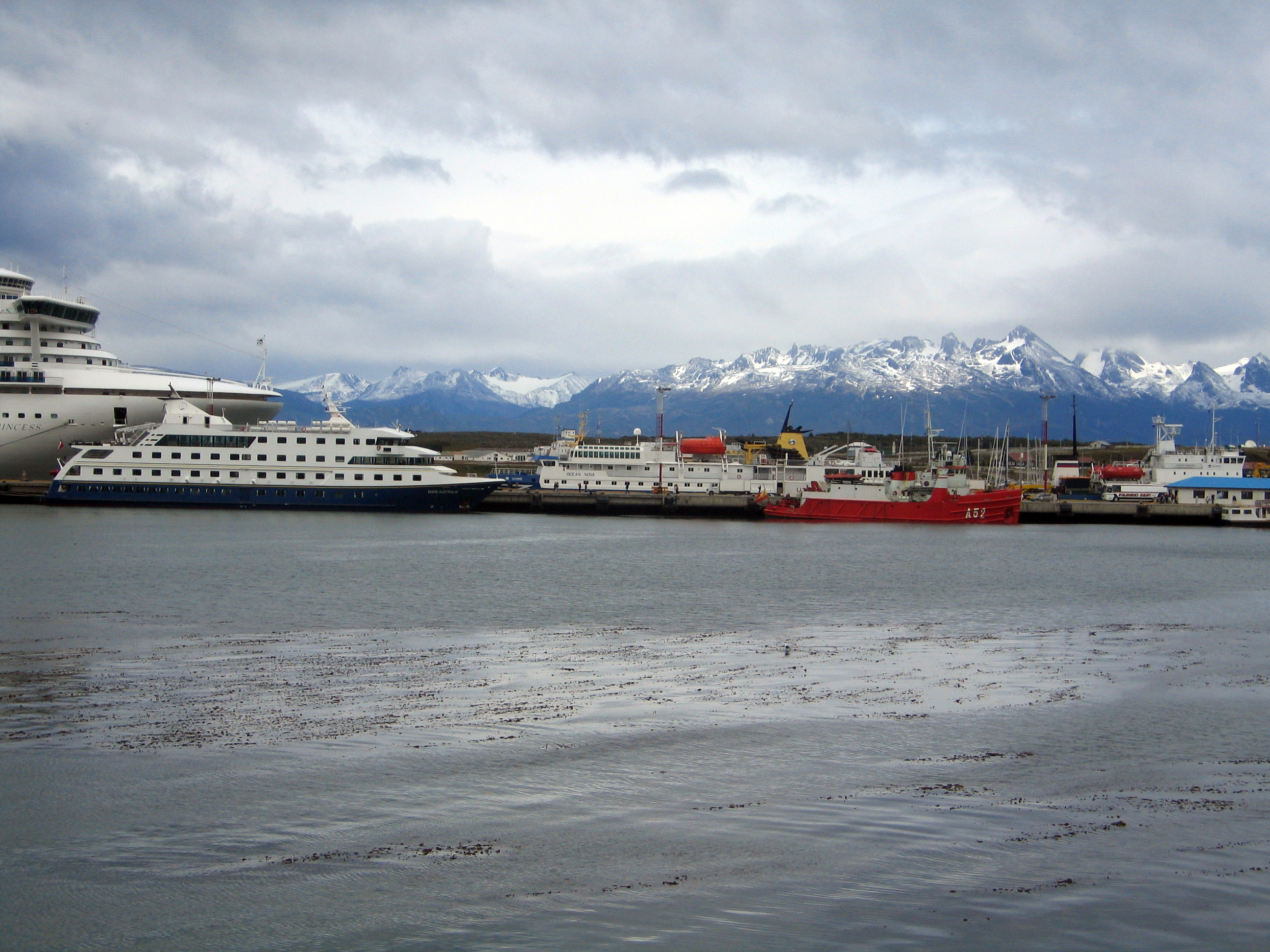
Port

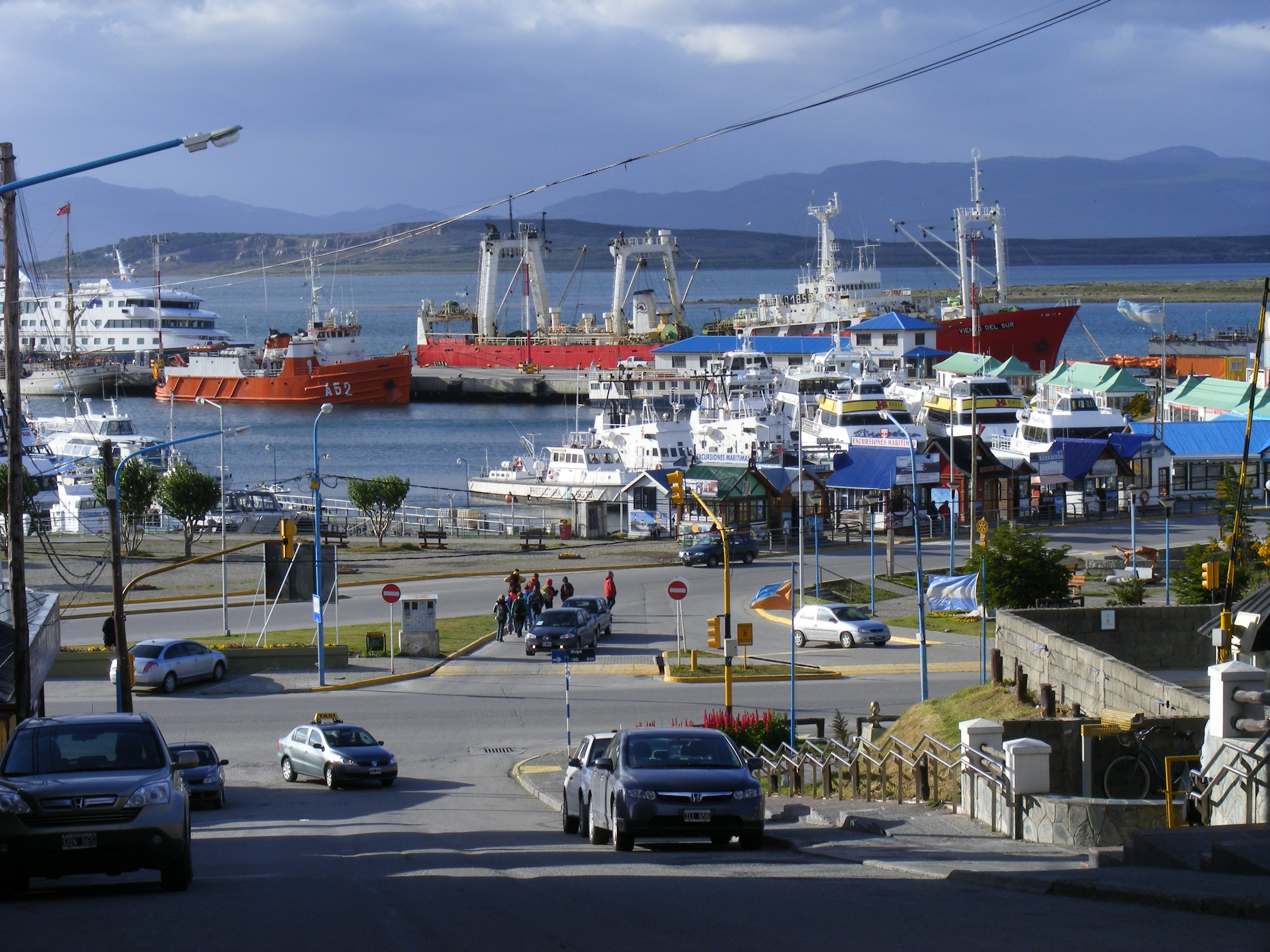
Harbor

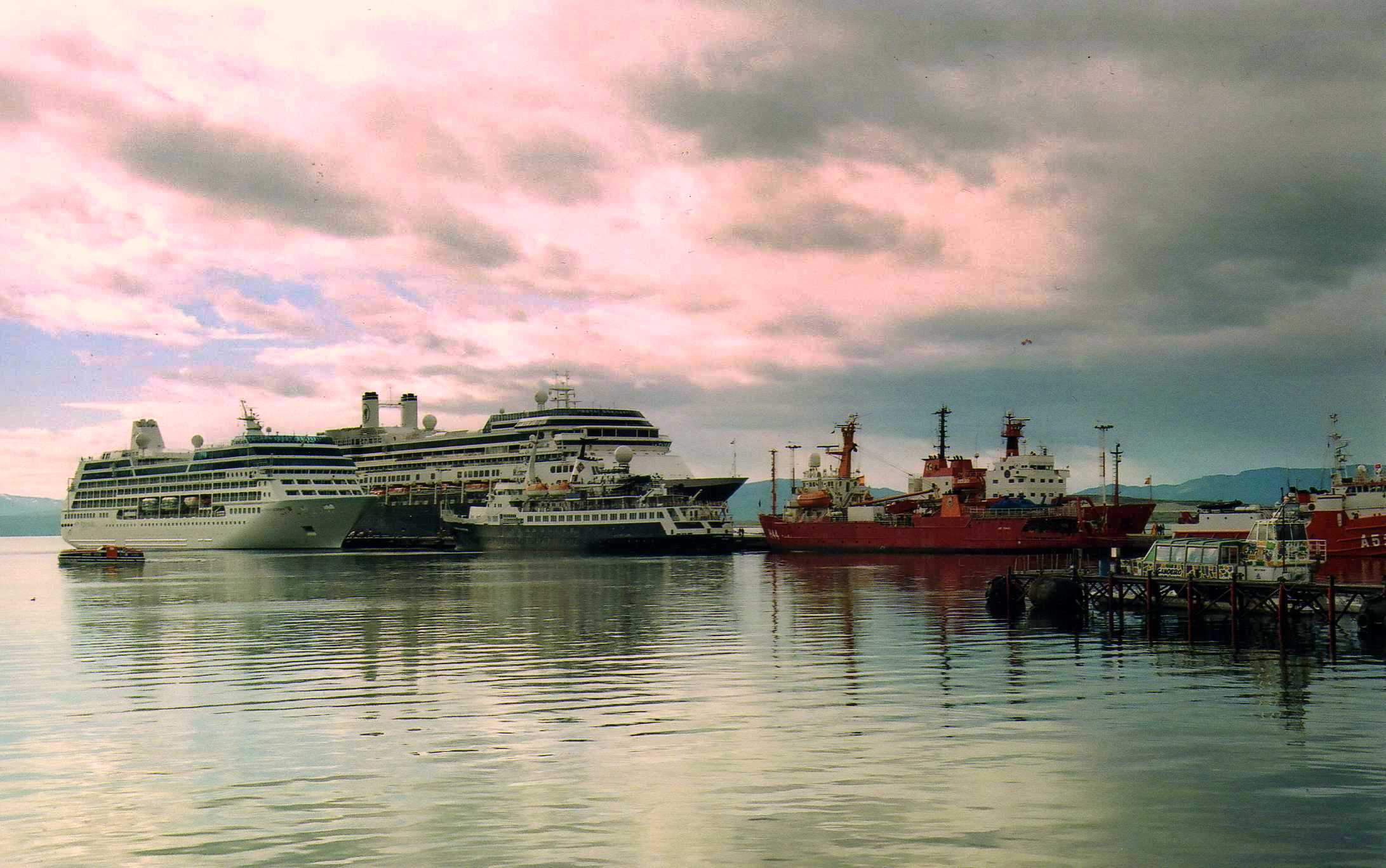
Cruise ships in Ushuaia

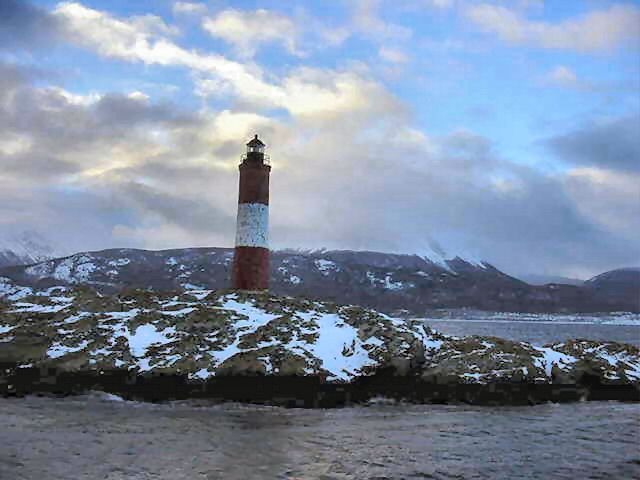
Lighthouse

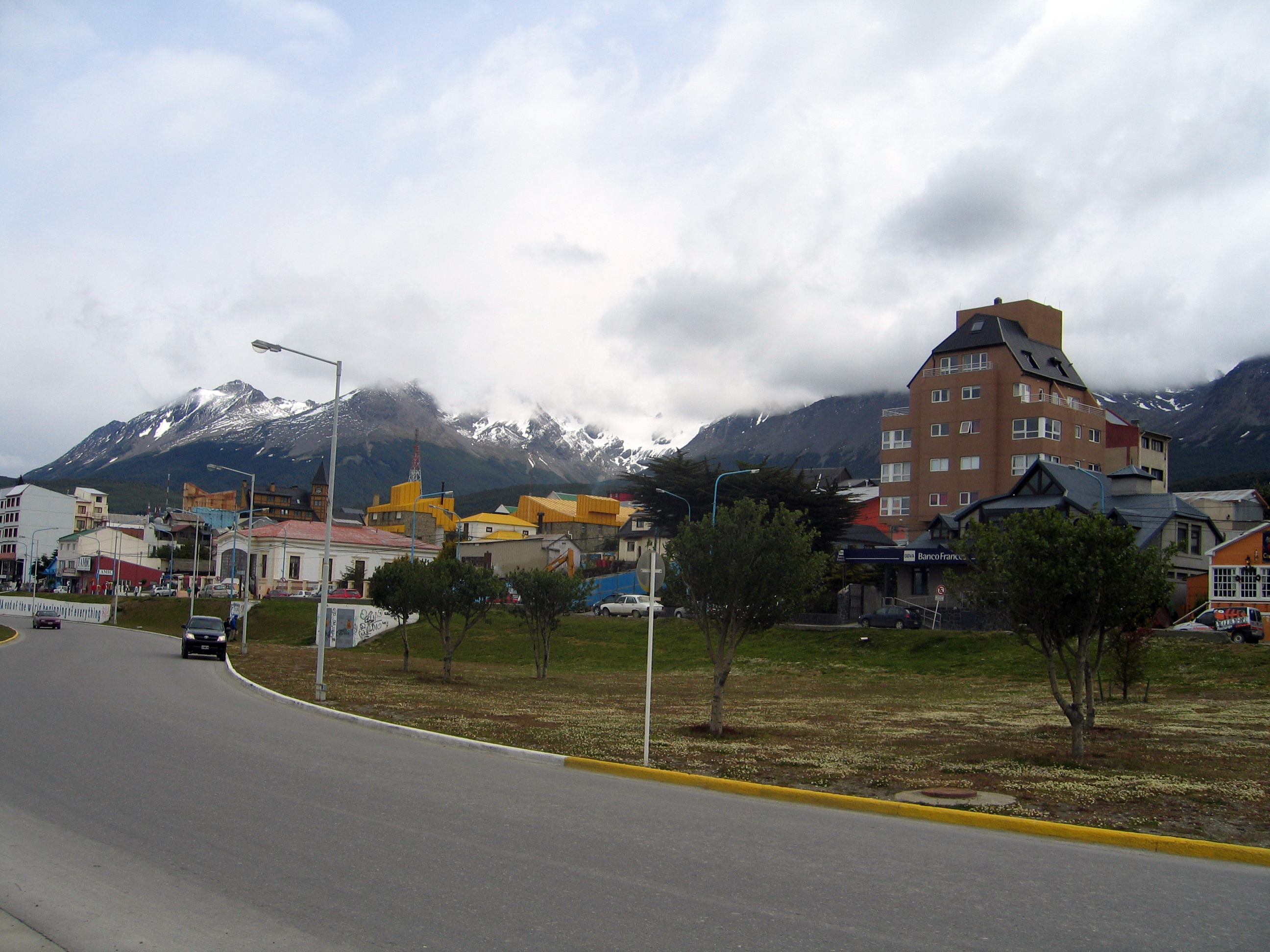
City view

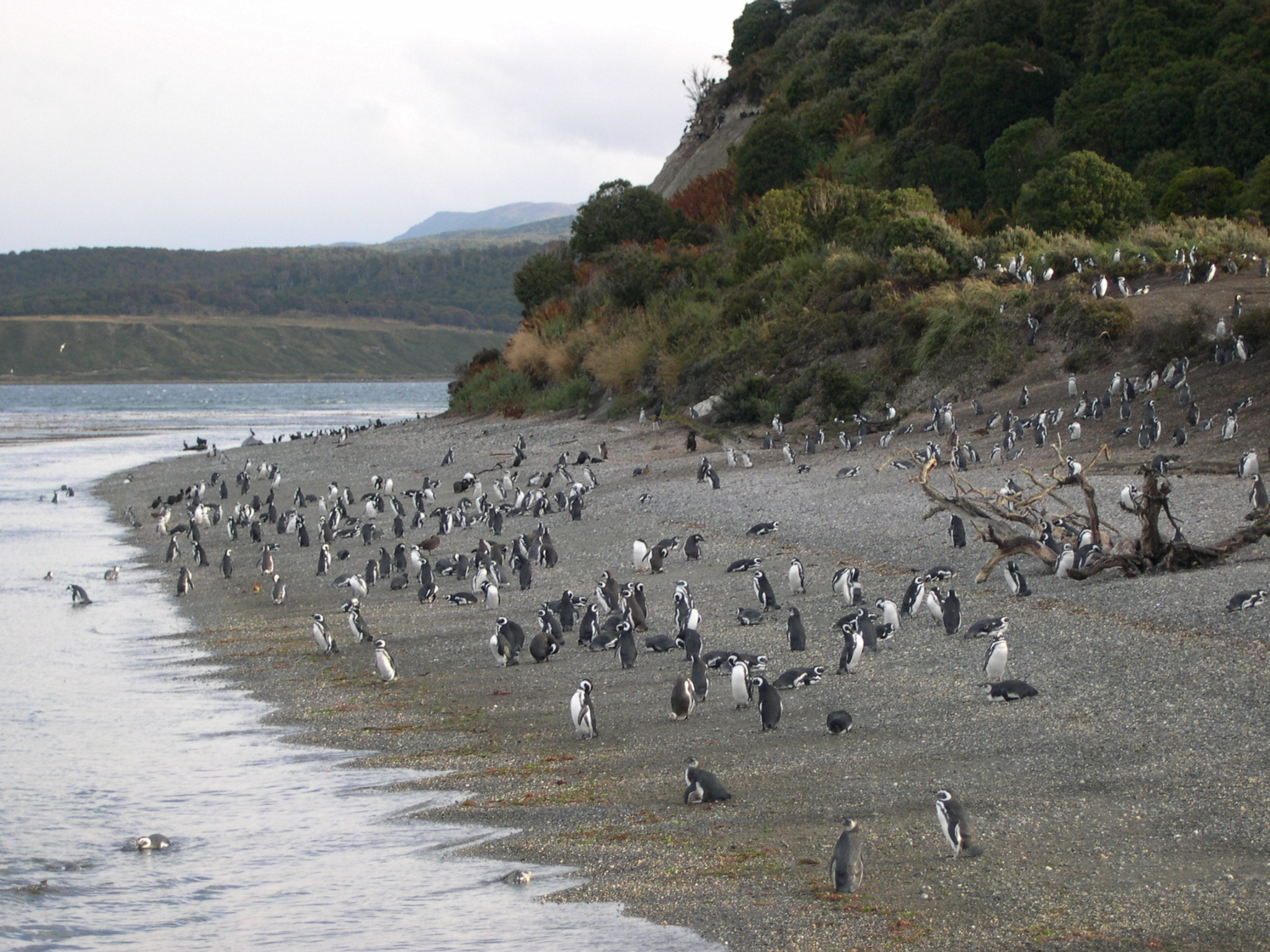
Penguins on Martillo Island

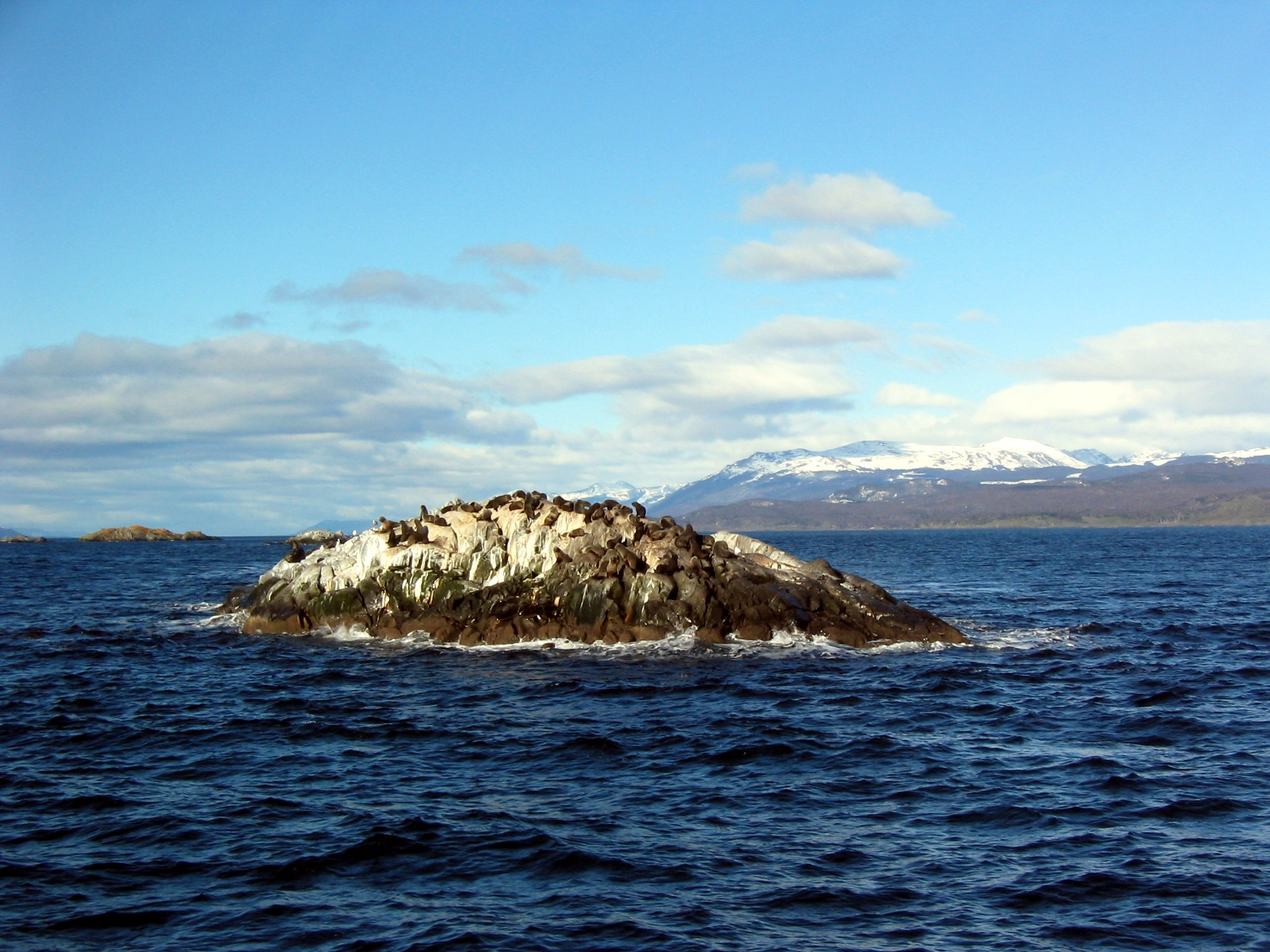
Los Lobos Island

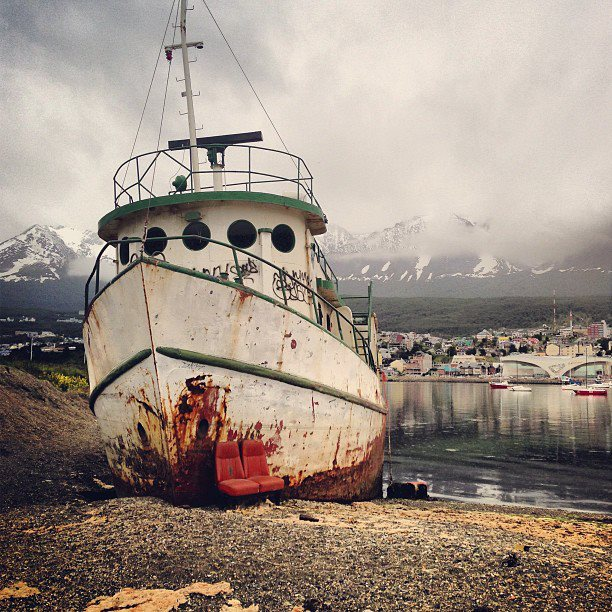
Shipwreck near Ushuaia

== See also ==
- Beagle conflict
