= Augusto Lasserre =

Argentine Naval Officer

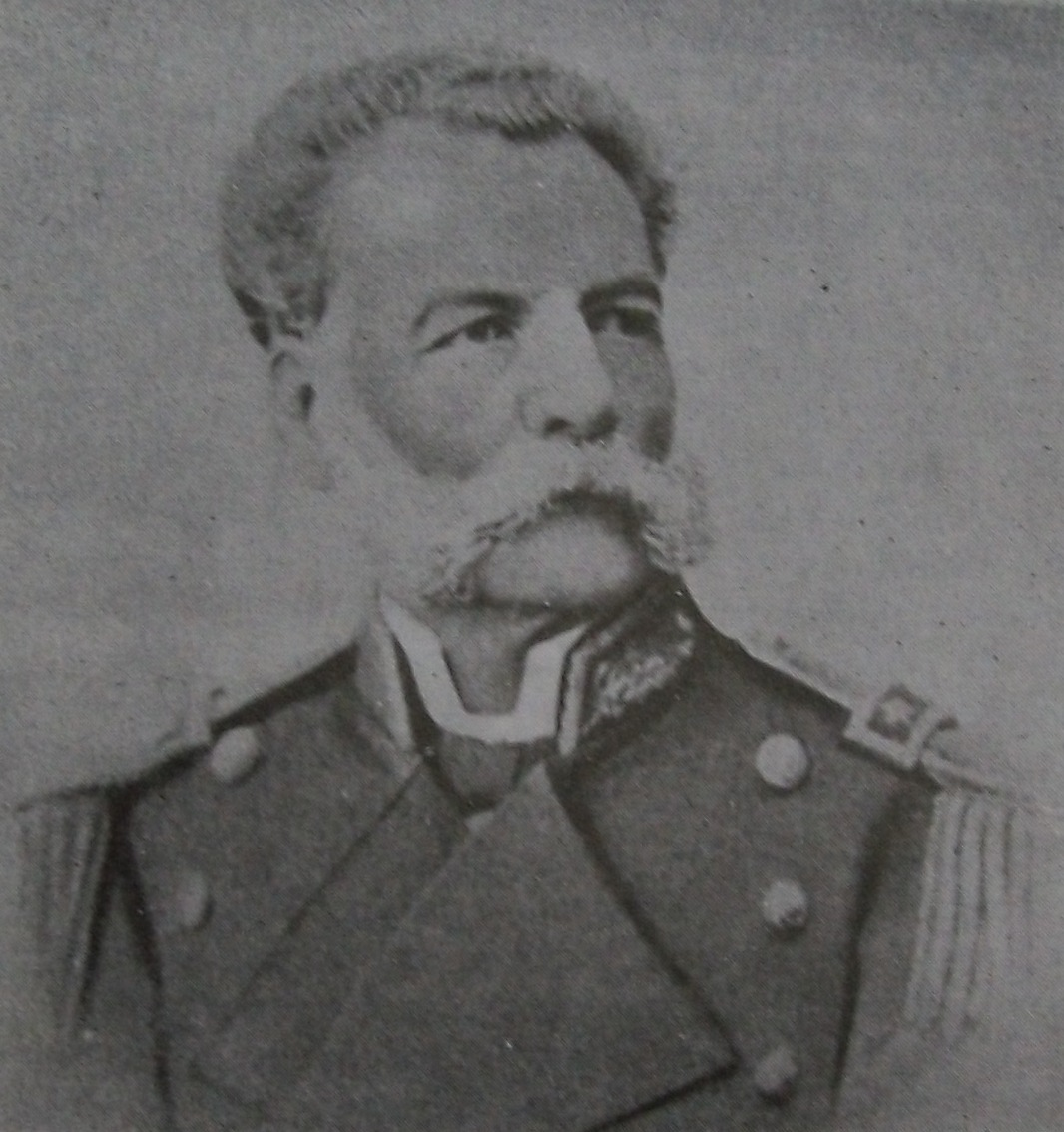
- Born: 1826; Montevideo, Empire of Brazil
- Died: 20 September, 1906 (aged 79–80); Buenos Aires, Argentina
- Military career
- Allegiance: Argentina
- Branch: Argentine Navy
- Rank: Commodore

Commodore Augusto Lasserre (1826-1906) was an officer in the Argentine Navy. He was born in 1826 in Montevideo. Lasserre was promoted to the rank of captain on the 11 June 1852. Later he was promoted to Commander of the Argentine Navy.

Commodore Lasserre was instrumental in establishing Argentina's claims to Patagonian territories, including the Isla de los Estados and Tierra del Fuego. He established the San Juan del Salvamento lighthouse on the Isla de los Estados in May 1884, which functioned until 1899. Better known as "Faro del fin del mundo" ("Lighthouse at the end of the world"), it is believed to have inspired Jules Verne for his book 'The Lighthouse at the End of the World'. He is recognized as the founder of the City of Ushuaia in Tierra del Fuego. He was also active in engaging the Government of Bartolomé Mitre during the earliest attempts to recover the Falkland Islands in the late 19th century.

He died in Buenos Aires on September 20, 1906.

== See also ==
- Tierra del Fuego, Antarctica and South Atlantic Islands Province
- Ushuaia
- Yaghan language (only one speaker left)
- Beagle conflict
- The Voyage of the Beagle
- Isla de los Estados
