= Martial Mountains =

Mountain range in Argentina and Chile

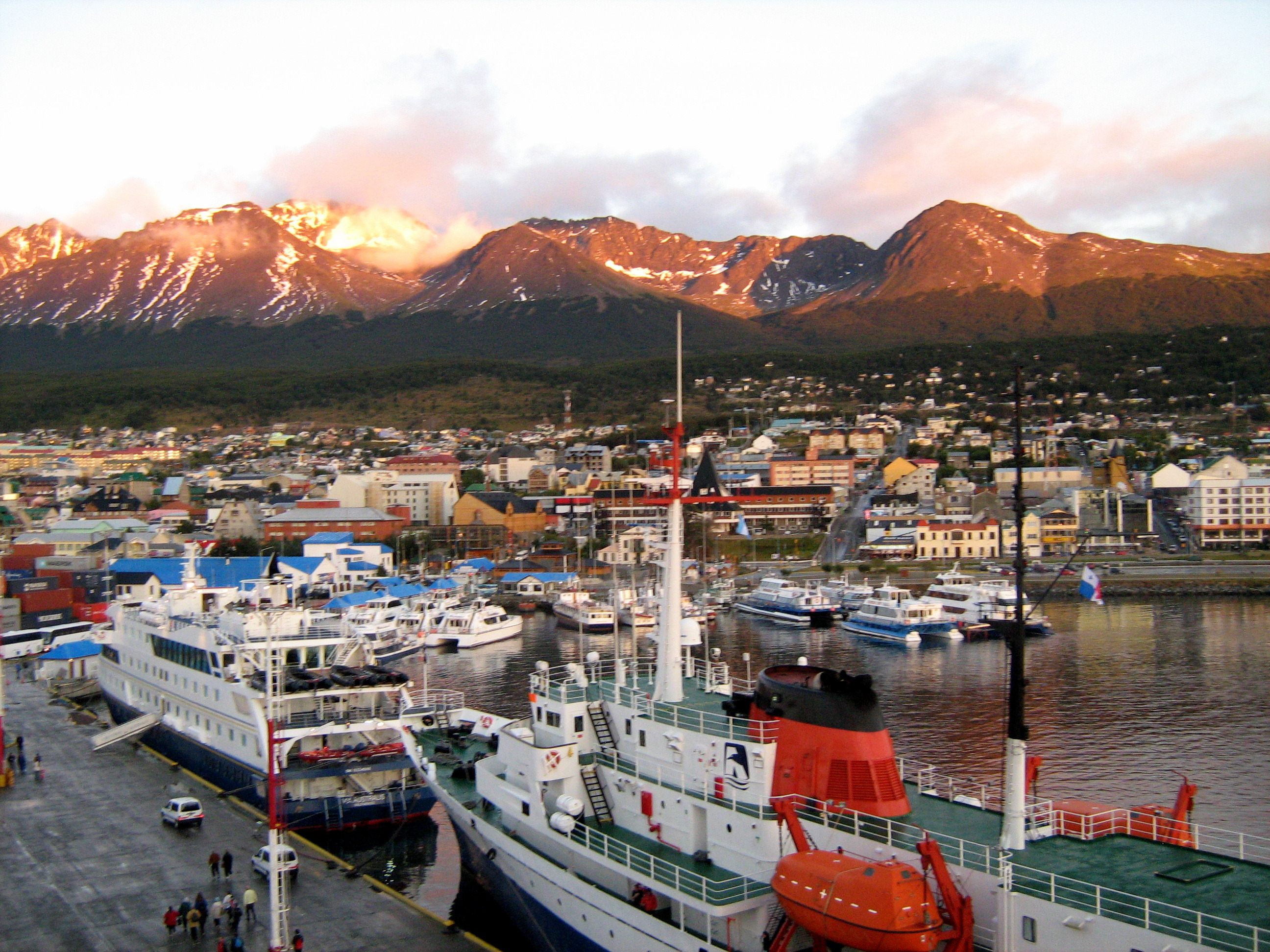
- View of the Martial Mountains from the port of Ushuaia

Geography
- Country: Argentina
- Region: Tierra del Fuego
- Range coordinates: 54°46.8′S 68°23.2′W
- Parent range: Andes

The Martial Mountains are a mountain range in Isla Grande de Tierra del Fuego, an island of Argentina and Chile. The mountain range is located east of Cordillera Darwin, just north of Ushuaia city in Argentina, along the Beagle Channel strait.

== See also ==
- Dientes del Navarino
- Marinelli Glacier
