= Isla de los Estados =

Argentine island near Tierra del Fuego

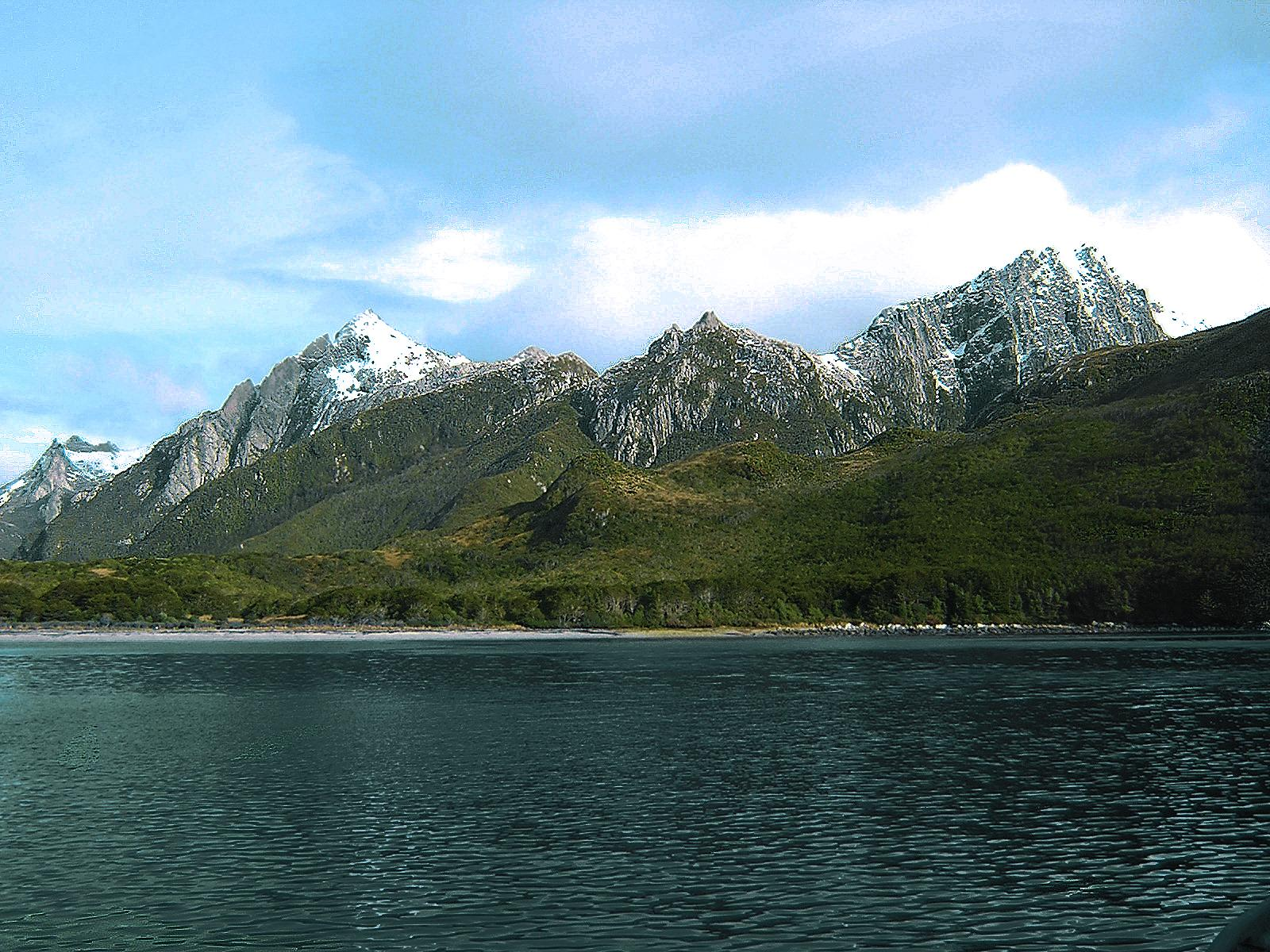
- Puerto Cook, north coast

- Location within Argentina

Geography
- Location: Atlantic Ocean
- Coordinates: 54°47′S 64°15′W
- Area: 534 km^{2} (206 sq mi)
- Length: 65 km (40.4 mi)
- Width: 15 km (9.3 mi)
- Highest elevation: 823 m (2700 ft)

Administration
- Argentina
- Province: Tierra del Fuego

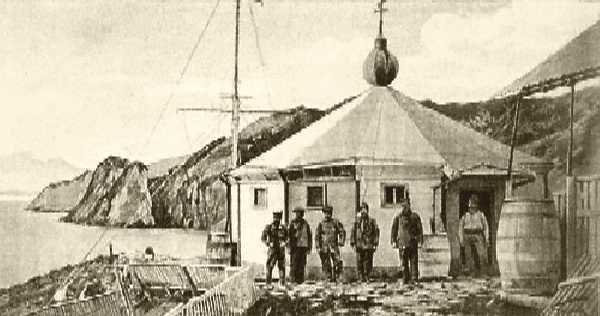
Lighthouse San Juan del Salvamento in the east (1898)

Isla de los Estados, also known in English as Staten Island, is an Argentine island that lies 29 kilometres (18 mi; 16 nmi) off the eastern extremity of Tierra del Fuego, from which it is separated by the Le Maire Strait. The island is part of the Argentine province of Tierra del Fuego, and of the department and city of Ushuaia. It has been declared an "Ecological, Historic, and Tourist Provincial Reserve" ("Reserva provincial ecológica, histórica y turística"), with access limited to tours from Ushuaia.

== Etymology ==
The island was named after the Netherlands States-General, the Dutch parliament (English: Staten Island, from the Dutch Stateneiland; Chuainisin in the Yamana language, meaning "land of abundance"; Jaiwesen in the Haush language, meaning "region of cold"; and Kéoin-harri in the Selkʼnam language, meaning "mountain range of the roots")

== History ==
Prior to European arrival, the island was visited by the Yamana people, who inhabited the islands south of Isla Grande de Tierra del Fuego.

The first Europeans to encounter the island were the Spanish naval captain Francisco de Hoces and his crew in 1526. His ship, the San Lesmes, was part of the Spanish Loaísa expedition to the Pacific Ocean. The ship found the island after it had become separated from the rest of the fleet in a storm.

Almost a century after the Spaniards, the Dutch explorers Jacob le Maire and Willem Schouten passed the island on 25 December 1615, naming it Staten Landt. Le Maire and Schouten sailed their ship, Eendracht, through a route south of the Straits of Magellan, a route now called the Le Maire Strait. To his left Le Maire noted the land mass which he called Staten Landt; he theorized it was perhaps a portion of the great 'Southern Continent.' (The first European name for New Zealand was Staten Landt, the name given to it by the Dutch explorer Abel Tasman, who in 1642 became the first European to see the islands. Tasman also assumed it was part of the 'Southern Continent' later known as Antarctica.)

The Dutch expedition to Valdivia of 1643 intended to sail through Le Maire Strait but strong winds made it instead drift south and east. The small fleet led by Hendrik Brouwer managed to enter the Pacific Ocean sailing south of the island disproving earlier beliefs that it was part of Terra Australis.

On New Year's Day, 1775, Captain James Cook named what is now "Puerto Año Nuevo", "New Year's Port". Seal hunters established a short-lived factory there (January 1787), but abandoned it after the Duke of York wrecked there on 11 September 1787 while bringing supplies.

The island is also referenced in Richard Henry Dana Jr.'s book Two Years Before the Mast. The crew of the Alert sighted Staten Land on July 22, 1836. Despite Dana's joy at encountering the first land since leaving San Diego more than two months earlier, he writes "...a more desolate-looking spot I never wish to set eyes upon;—–bare, broken, and girt with rocks and ice, with here and there, between rocks and broken hillocks, a little stunted vegetation of shrubs."

In 1862 Argentine pilot Luis Piedrabuena established a shelter near Port Cook, and built a small seal oil extraction facility on the island.

More than twenty years later, the San Juan del Salvamento Lighthouse was inaugurated on 25 May 1884, by Comodoro Augusto Lasserre. It operated until September 1900. The lighthouse, better known as Faro del fin del mundo ("Lighthouse at the end of the world"), is said to have inspired Jules Verne's novel The Lighthouse at the End of the World (1905). A military prison was based on the island from 1896 to 1902. It had to be moved to Tierra del Fuego after being compromised by the strong winds.

== Geography ==
The island is approximately 65 km (40 mi) long east-west, and 15 km (9 mi) wide, with an area of 534 km^{2} (206 sq mi). The island is deeply indented by bays. Its highest point is 823 m (2,700 ft), and is considered to be the last prominence of the Andes mountain range. It receives around 2,000 mm (79 in) of rain per year.

The island is surrounded by minor islands and rocks, the largest being Observatorio island 6.5 km (4.04 mi) north, with an area of 4 km^{2} (2 sq mi). At the eastern end of the island is Cape Saint John, a landmark for ships sailing around the island in order to avoid the currents and tides of the Le Maire Strait to the west.

The only settlement is the Puerto Parry Naval Station, located in a deep and narrow fjord on the northern coast of the island. The naval station, established in 1978, is staffed by a team of four seamen on a 45-day rotation. They monitor environmental conservation and ship movements, and provide emergency assistance.

=== Geology ===
The island's Formation is mainly Jurassic Lemaire, which is tuffs and lavas. The Islas Año Nuevo, Isla Observatoria, and the Caleta Lacroix region on the west coast, however, have exposures of the Jurassic-Cretaceous Beauvoir Formation, mainly composed of shales, mudstones, limestones, and graywacke, plus silt, clay, sand and gravel glacial fluvial deposits. There are at least 18 fjords, with associated glacial sediments such as moraines and till, especially prevalent at Cape San Antonio and Cape Colnett on the north coast. Key fjords on the north coast include Port Hoppner, Port Parry, Port Basil Hall, Port Año Nuevo, Port Cook, and Port San Juan Del Salvamento going east to west. Key fjords on the south coast include Bahía Capitan Cánepa, Port Lobo, Port Vancouver, and Bahía Blossom, going east to west. Cape Kempe on the south coast lies opposite Cape San Antonio.

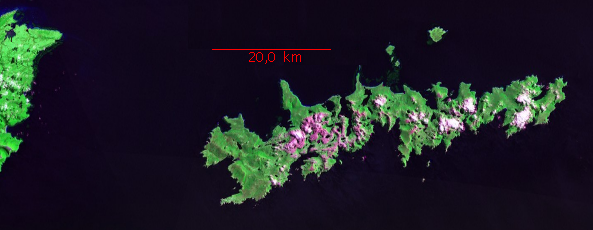
Landsat Geocover 2000 image of Isla de los Estados, with Tierra del Fuego at the left

=== Climate ===
The island has a cold and humid climate and is characterized by rapid and unpredictable changes in the weather from day to day. Under the Köppen climate classification, despite the vegetation, it would be classified as a mild tundra climate (ET), a cold climate with a mean temperature in the warmest month below 10 °C (50.0 °F) with abundant precipitation year-round.

The climate of the island is strongly influenced by the subpolar low pressure system which develops around the Antarctic Circle and the surrounding oceans. Being located between the semi–permanent high pressure cell and the subpolar low (which does not change in intensity through the year and have little seasonal variation), the island is exposed to westerlies throughout the year.

Temperatures are low year round but without extreme minimum temperatures. The mean temperature in summer is 8.3 °C (46.9 °F) with mean extremes of 16.2 °C (61.2 °F) and 3.0 °C (37.4 °F) while in winter, the mean temperature is 3.3 °C (37.9 °F) with mean extremes of 7.7 °C (45.9 °F) and −4 °C (24.8 °F). Mean temperatures are lower than in Tierra del Fuego but due to the moderating influence of the ocean, extreme minimum temperatures are higher than in Tierra del Fuego. Coastal areas have average temperatures above 0 °C (32.0 °F) in the coldest month while higher altitude locations may average below 0 °C (32.0 °F).

Though no reliable records are available, it is estimated that the island averages around 2,000 mm (79 in) of precipitation per year. However, owing to its relief, precipitation is highly variable across the island. In the eastern parts of the island, it averages 1,400 mm (55 in) based on four years of data. Precipitation occurs frequently on the island, averaging 252 days with precipitation. June is the wettest month while October is the driest. Thunderstorms are very rare. Snow frequently falls during the winter months, averaging 33 days, although snow can fall during autumn and spring. The island receives high cloud cover throughout the year, with 74% of the days being cloudy. June is the cloudiest month while October is the least cloudy month. Fog is uncommon, averaging only 16 days per year. Similar to the rest of Patagonia, the island is exposed to strong westerly winds. These winds often carry moisture with them, leading to frequent storms. Average wind speeds range from a high of 37 km/h (23 mph) in August to a low of 24 km/h (15 mph) in December.

=== Flora and fauna ===
Isla de los Estados is covered with dense low forests of Nothofagus (southern beech). The animal life is composed mainly of penguins, orcas, seals, seagulls, and cormorants, as well as human-introduced deer and goats. The island is the location of one of the more southerly Atlantic breeding colonies of the Magellanic penguin. As early as the last part of the 18th century, Isla de los Estados was used as a seal harvesting location. The island and surrounding waters, including the Burdwood Bank, an ocean bank to its east, have been designated an Important Bird Area (IBA) by BirdLife International because it supports significant populations of southern rockhopper and Magellanic penguins, imperial shags, and striated caracaras.

== See also ==
- Lists of islands

== Books ==
- Ponce, Juan; Fernandez, Marilen (2014). Climate and Environmental History of Isla de Los Estados, Argentina. Srpinger. ISBN 978-94-007-4362-5.
