= Transocean Tours =

German cruise line

- Industry: Transportation
- Founded: 1954
- Defunct: 20 July 2020
- Products: Cruises
- Parent: Cruise & Maritime Voyages
- Website: www.transocean.de

Transocean Tours was a German cruise line that operated ocean-going cruise ships in the German and British markets and river cruise ships in Germany. The company was formed in 1954 and first began operating cruises in 1972, using ships chartered from the Soviet Union-based Baltic Shipping Company.

The company, along with its United Kingdom based parent company Cruise & Maritime Voyages (CMV), went into administration on 20 July 2020.

== History ==
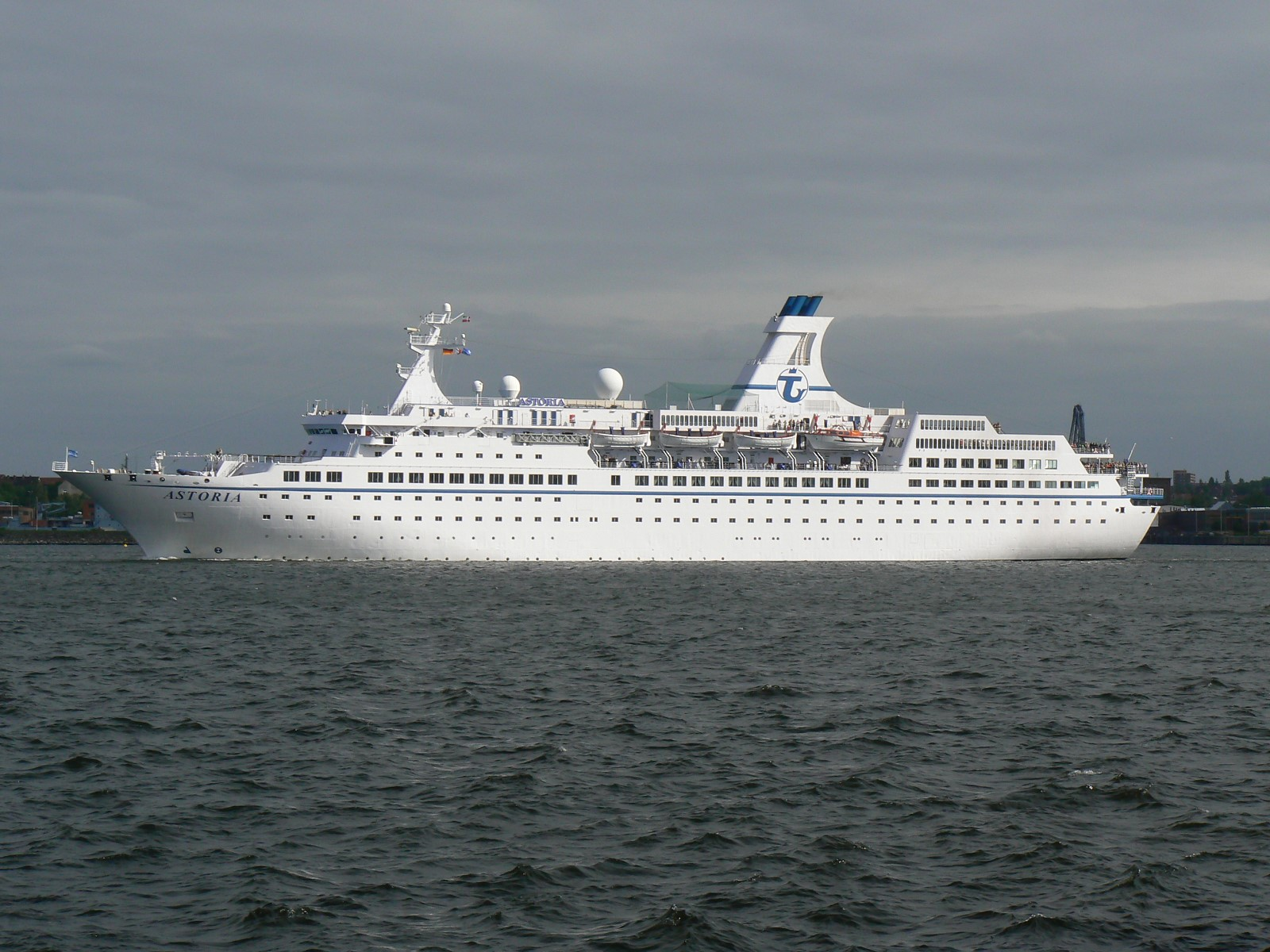
Astoria in Kiel in 2007.

=== Early years ===
Transocean Tours Turistik was formed in West Germany in 1954. In 1967 the company became the West German agents of the Soviet Union-based Baltic Shipping Company, marketing cruises on the MS Alexandr Pushkin and MS Estonia. In 1972 Transocean Tours chartered the Estonia for full-time German market cruising. She was subsequently followed by several ships, including river cruise ships, chartered from both the Baltic Shipping Company and the Black Sea Shipping Company. Until the 1990s the chartered ships retained their Soviet funnel colours even when in Transocean service. Following the collapse of the Soviet Union the company begun chartering ships from other companies, starting with MS Calypso in 1994. At the same ships in Transocean service started to be painted in the company's white/blue livery.

=== 1997-present ===
Between 1997 and 2001, the company fleet consisted of just two ships, the ocean-going cruise ship MS Astor and the river cruise ship MS Moldavia. In 2001, the river cruise ship MS Ukraina re-joined the fleet, followed by the Astor's near-sister MS Astoria in 2002. Another river cruise ship joined the fleet in 2005, while MS Arielle was chartened in 2006 for British-market cruising. In 2008 the Arielle was replaced by MS Marco Polo.

In 2008, Transocean Tours stated the charter of the Astoria would be terminated in 2009, and that the company are looking for another ship to replace her. She was sold to Saga Cruises operating as Saga Pearl II with a short period as Quest for Adventure in 2012/13.

On 4 September 2010, Transocean Tours announced that the Germany-based line would be going through a restructuring, which was the equivalent to Chapter 11 bankruptcy restructuring in the United States. After a period of uncertainty Transocean was sold to South Quay Travel & Leisure Ltd. in early 2014 and since then operated as the German branch of Cruise & Maritime Voyages (CMV) under the name Transocean Cruises.

In addition to their own Astor; Transocean Tours offered cruises on CMV's cruise ships Magellan and Columbus and on several river cruise ships (Bellejour, Belvedere, Sans Souci).

It was announced on 7 March 2018 that CMV purchased the Pacific Eden from P&O Cruises Australia. CMV planned to sail the ship under the Transocean brand, cruising to Northern and Western Europe during the summer and Australia during the winter, replacing Astor. CMV received Pacific Eden in April 2019 and renamed her Vasco da Gama on 9 June 2019.

Transocean was scheduled to receive Pacific Aria from P&O Cruises Australia in May 2021. The company intended to rename the ship Ida Pfeiffer, after the Austrian explorer, Ida Pfeiffer, in May 2021.

Sky News reported on 15 July 2020 that CMV was facing insolvency and was in talks with VGO Capital Management, which Sky described as "a special situations investor with expertise in the shipping industry," for additional financing. CMV had previously sought a financing agreement with private equity firm Novalpina Capital; this attempt failed after Barclays declined to offer the company a state-backed loan.

After its parent company's attempts to secure financing failed, Transocean Tours, as well as CMV, entered administration on 20 July 2020, with all trading ceased and all sales offices closed with immediate effect.

== Fleet ==
Ship	Built	In service	Chartered from	Tonnage	Flag	Notes	Image
MS Alexandr Pushkin/MS Marco Polo	1965	1979 – 1985/2008 – 2010	Baltic Shipping Company/Far Eastern Shipping Company, Global Maritime	22,080 GRT	Leningrad, Soviet Union/Bahamas	Sailing for Cruise & Maritime Voyages until 2020. Scrapped in Alang in 2021.	
MS Calypso	1967	1994–2000	?	11,162 GRT	Bahamas	She later became The Calypso and was owned by Louis Cruises scrapped late 2013.	
MS Gripsholm	1965	1996–1997	Norwegian American Line	24,528 GRT	Bahamas	Chartered for six months and later sold to Saga Cruises after being damaged by fire, she would become the Saga Rose and later was sold for scrap in 2009.	
MS Astoria	1981	2002–2009	Club Cruise	18,853 GRT	Bahamas	Entered service in 2009 as MS Saga Pearl II with Saga Cruises.	
MS Arielle	1970	2006–2008	Louis Cruises	23,149 GRT	Bahamas	Was returned to Louis Cruises in 2008, 3 years earlier than scheduled; later sold and as of 2012, scrapped in Alang in 2015.	
MS Astor	1987	2001–2020	Astor Shipping/Premicon	20,606 GRT	Bahamas	Scrapped in Aliağa in 2020.	
Vasco da Gama	1992	2019–2020		55,451 GT	Bahamas	Transferred from P&O Cruises Australia as Pacific Eden to CMV for Transocean in April 2019. Sailing under Transocean Tours brand since 9 June 2019 in Europe and Australia	
Magellan	1985	until 2020		46,052 GT	Bahamas	Sold to Seajets after CMV ceased operetions. Scpapped in Alang, India in 2021 als Mages.	
Columbus	1989	until 2020		63,500 GT	Bahamas	Sold for scrap at Alang, India as Colus in 2021	
Ida Pfeiffer	1994	2021 (planned; never entered service)		55,451 GT	N/A	Sold to CMV in November 2019; was scheduled to join Transocean in May 2021	
