= Vasco da Gama (ship) =

German cruise ship

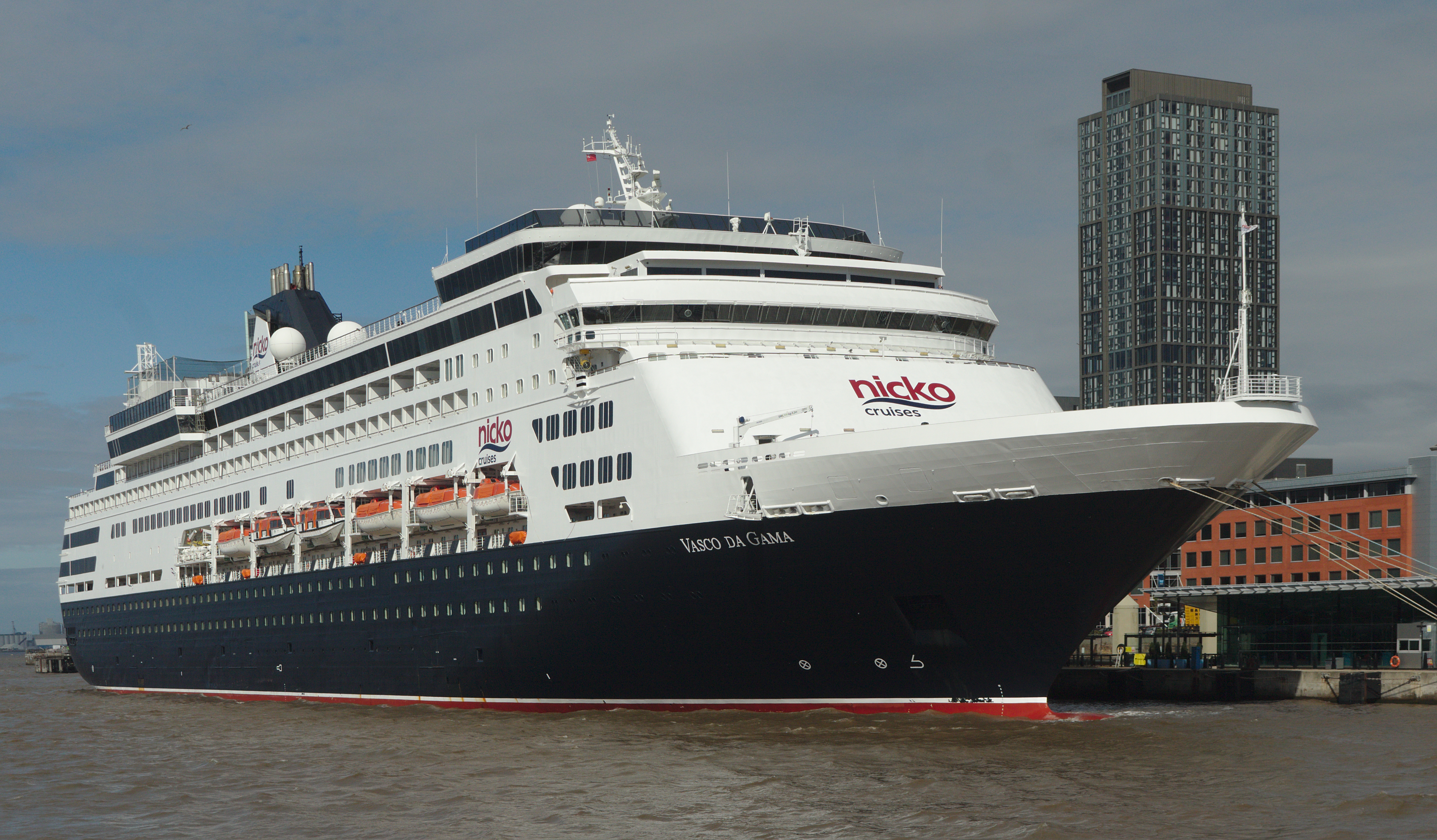
- Vasco da Gama in Liverpool, 2021

History
- Name: 1992–2015: Statendam; 2015–2019: Pacific Eden; 2019–present: Vasco da Gama
- Owner: 1993–2019: Carnival Corporation; 2019–2020: Cruise & Maritime Voyages; 2020–present: Mystic Invest
- Operator: 1993–2015: Holland America Line; 2015–2019: P&O Cruises Australia; 2019–2020: Cruise & Maritime Voyages; 2020–present: Nicko Cruises
- Port of registry: 1993–1996: Nassau, Bahamas; 1996–2015: Rotterdam, Netherlands; 2015–2019: London, United Kingdom; 2019–2020: Nassau, Bahamas; 2020-present: Madeira, Portugal
- Ordered: 1 March 1992
- Builder: Fincantieri, Italy
- Cost: US$180 million
- Yard number: Monfalcone shipyard 5881
- Laid down: 30 July 1991
- Launched: 3 April 1992
- Completed: January 1993
- Maiden voyage: 1993
- In service: 1993
- Identification: Call sign: C6EG8; IMO number: 8919245; MMSI number: 311000891
- Status: In Service

General characteristics
- Class & type: S-class cruise ship
- Tonnage: 55,451 GT; 26,945 NT; 7,637 DWT
- Length: 219 m (718 ft 6 in)
- Beam: 30.8 m (101 ft 1 in)
- Height: 40 m (131 ft 3 in)
- Draught: 7.5 m (24 ft 7 in)
- Depth: 19.2 m (63 ft 0 in)
- Decks: 14
- Deck clearance: 11.5 m (37 ft 9 in)
- Ice class: D (minimum)
- Installed power: 2 x Sulzer 12ZAV40S, 3 x Sulzer 8ZA40S
- Propulsion: 2 x ABB 12,000 kW (16,000 hp)
- Speed: 22 knots (41 km/h; 25 mph)
- Capacity: 1,258 passengers
- Crew: 557

Vasco da Gama is a cruise ship operated by German cruise line Nicko Cruises Schiffsreisen. Completed in 1993, she previously sailed for Holland America Line as Statendam, for P&O Cruises Australia as Pacific Eden and for Cruise & Maritime Voyages as Vasco da Gama. In 2020, following CMV's filing for administration, she was sold to Mystic Cruises.

== Construction and career ==
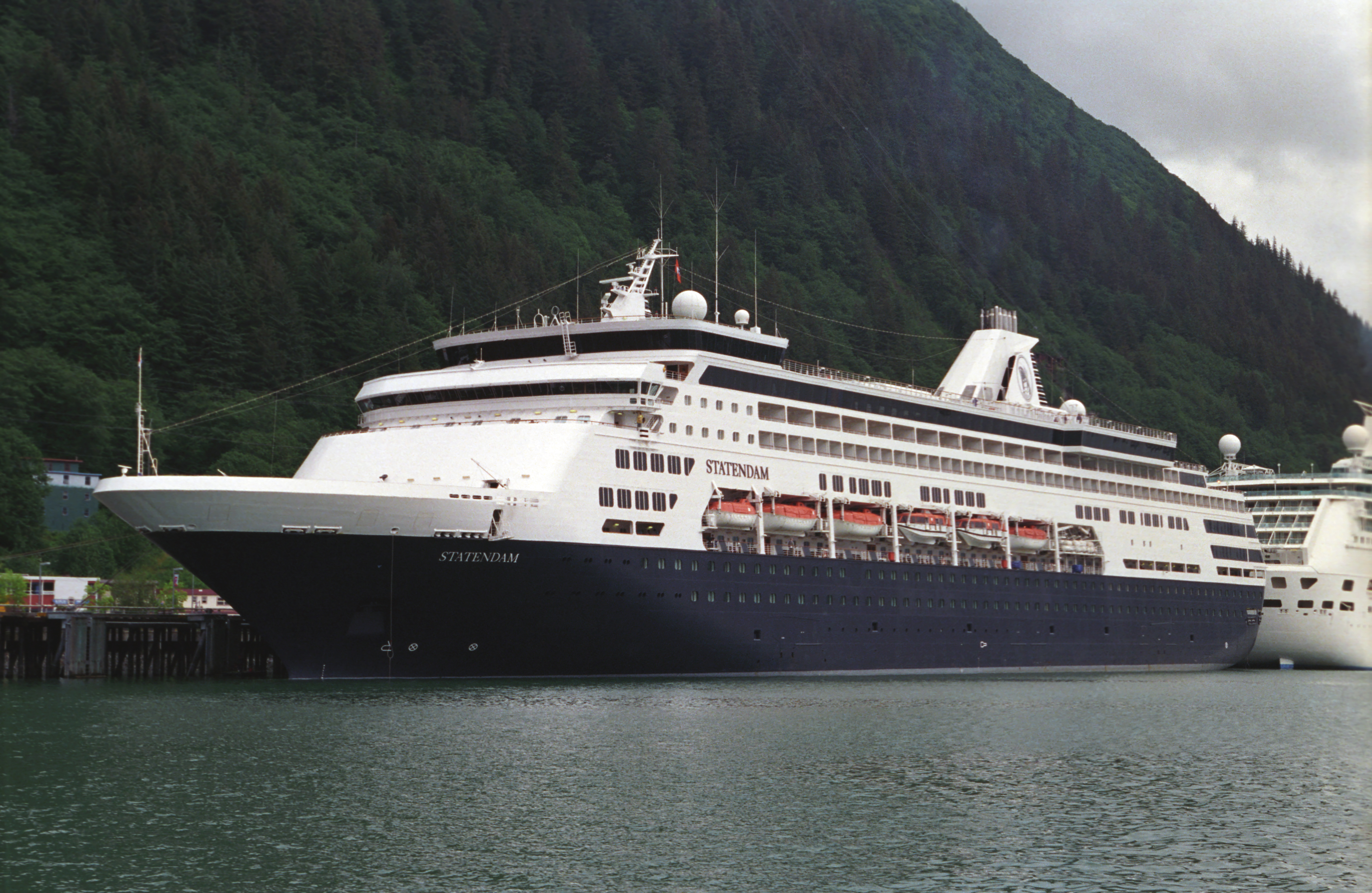
Statendam, 1998

=== Statendam ===
Vasco da Gama previously sailed as Statendam from 1993 to 2015, where she served as the lead member of Holland America Line's eponymous Statendam class, otherwise known as S class. She was ordered in November 1989 alongside two sister ships of her class, and was designated Hull Number 5881. Her keel was laid by Fincantieri in 1991. From 1991 to 1993, the ship was completed and underwent sea trials, and on 25 January 1993, Statendam embarked on her maiden voyage. Upon her maiden voyage, she became the fifth Holland America Line ship to bear the name Statendam, and during the summer of her inaugural season, she also became the first Holland America Line ship to sail a European itinerary in over twenty years.

During her early planning and architectural design phases, there were concerns that Statendam and the S class would not be in compliance with specific vessel stability requirements mandated by SOLAS 90. The hull design of Maasdam and her sister ships are largely based on Costa Classica, a ship operated by sister brand Costa Cruises. These fears were alleviated, however, following Statendam's successful sea trials.

In 2006, Statendam underwent dry dock renovations at Grand Bahama Shipyard in Freeport.

In 2011, Statendam once again underwent dry dock renovations at Grand Bahama Shipyard in Freeport.

In August 2013, Statendam was alerted by the Glacier Bay National Park ranger station that a nearby tour ship, Baranof Wind, was stranded in the ice of Hopkins Glacier, and unable to continue to Glacier Bay National Park. On arrival Statendam lowered two lifeboats to rescue approximately 105 passengers and crew. They were disembarked at Glacier Bay National Park ranger station three hours later.

On 20 May 2014, Holland America Line announced that Statendam would be transferred to P&O Cruises Australia.

=== Pacific Eden ===
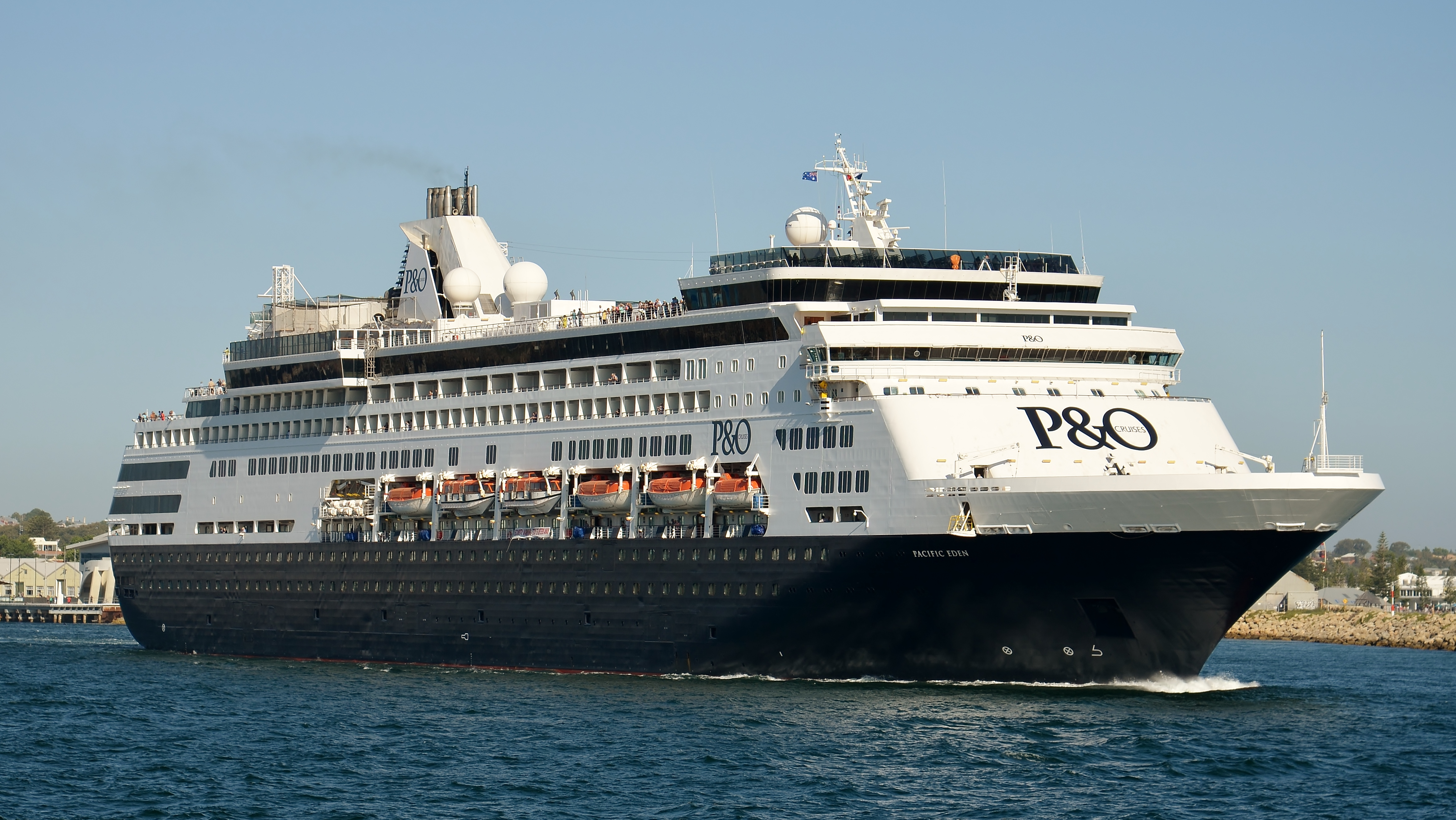
Pacific Eden in Fremantle, 2015

After concluding her final season with Holland America Line, Statendam sailed to Singapore for dry dock at Sembcorp Marine Admiralty Yard. From 22 October to 2 November 2015, Statendam underwent extensive interior and exterior changes, emerging as the new Pacific Eden. In an attempt to garner global social media recognition for the introduction of two new flagships, P&O Cruises Australia broadcast the ships' christening ceremony on Twitter and through their godmothers' social media accounts. On 25 November 2015, Pacific Eden and her sister, Pacific Aria, were renamed at a ceremony held in Port Jackson, Sydney. Kate Ritchie served as the godmother for Pacific Eden.

=== Vasco da Gama ===
In March 2018 Pacific Eden was sold to Cruise & Maritime Voyages (CMV), with delivery in March 2019. Following the purchase, members of CMV's Columbus Club were asked to choose between four names that honoured famous explorers: Vasco da Gama, Pytheas, Henry Hudson, and Amerigo Vespucci; Vasco da Gama was chosen. After a refit in Singapore, Vasco da Gama sailed on 23 April 2019 for Tilbury on her inaugural cruise, with calls in Malaysia, Thailand, India, Egypt, Jordan and Morocco, celebrating her namesake's travels. On 9 June 2019 she was christened in Bremerhaven by German singer Annett Louisan, entering service with CMV's Transocean Tours. The ship's deployment was to spend the European summer with Transocean before repositioning to Australia for the southern summer under the CMV brand.

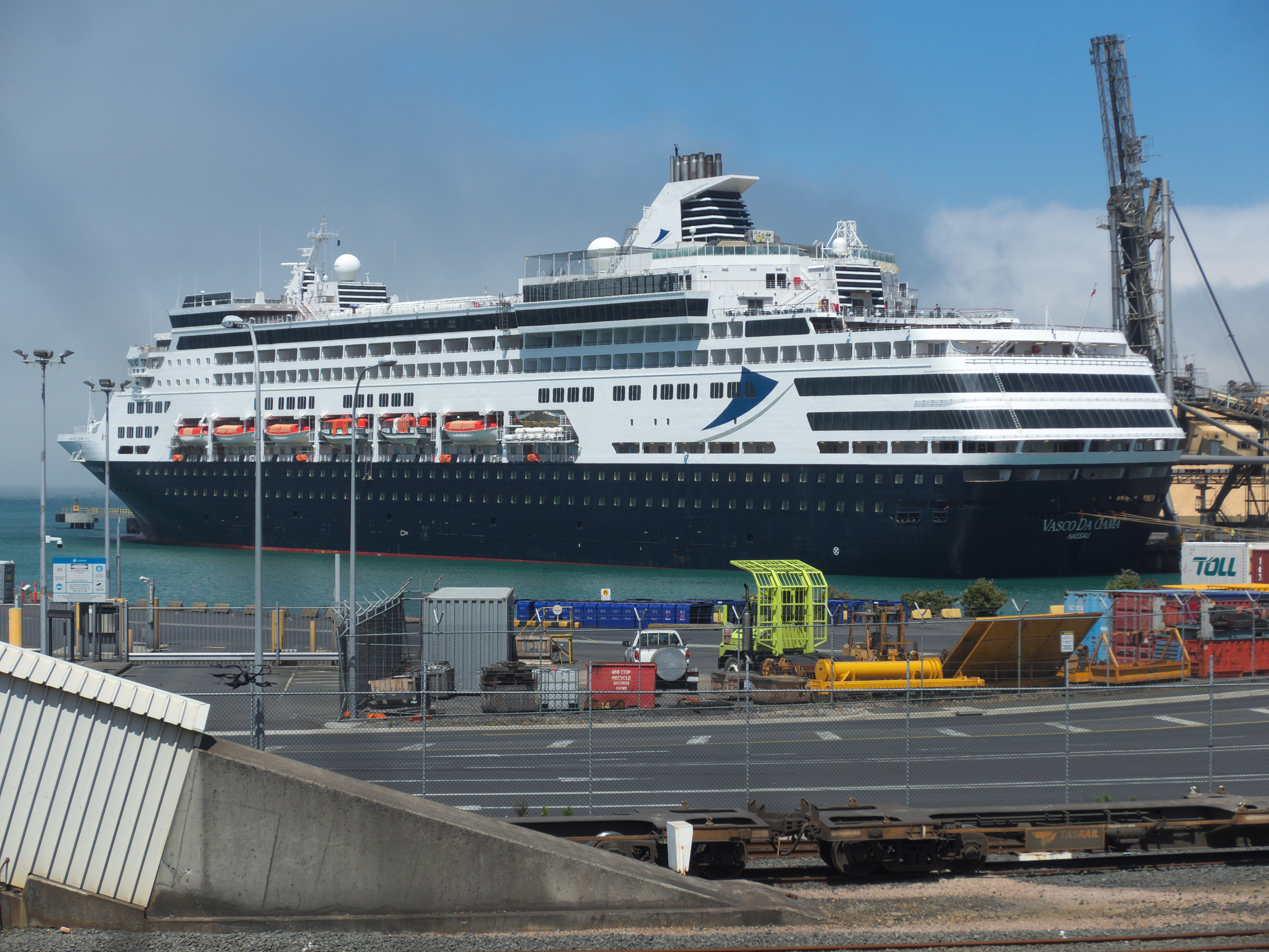
CMV's Vasco da Gama at Burnie, 2019

During the COVID-19 pandemic, two CMV ships swapped passengers at sea off Phuket to allow all Europeans to return direct to Tilbury on Columbus; Australian and New Zealand passengers joined Vasco da Gama, which docked in Fremantle, Australia on 27 March 2020. Despite no positive cases, the 197 West Australian passengers were ferried to Rottnest Island, which had been converted to a quarantine zone, to self-isolate; another 600 Australians quarantined in Perth hotels, and some 100 New Zealand passengers were flown to Auckland. All CMV's operations were suspended, and Vasco da Gama subsequently sailed without passengers to Tilbury, arriving on 30 April.

On 19 May, a male Indonesian crew member fell from deck 12 of the ship while it was docked at the Port of Tilbury, London's main port, and landed on a cargo container that had been placed on the dock next to the ship. One source reported that he died from the fall, while another reported that he was seriously injured but there was no confirmation that he had died, and a third reported that he was being treated at a hospital. The crew member had been working as a storekeeper in the ship's supply area. Vasco da Gama had been docked at Tilbury since 1 May, after having repatriated passengers to Australia. Crew members have complained that they have not been paid and are frustrated with Cruise & Maritime Voyages. (Note: For example, one crew member complained that they have not been paid for work since April; that they have been locked up for two months, with neither alcohol nor cigarettes, only water and juice; and that Wi-Fi has only been available starting at midnight.)

Unable to trade, CMV entered administration on 20 July 2020 and in October, Mystic Invest bought the ship at auction, on behalf of Mystic Cruises, for US$10.2 million. Since July 2021, she has sailed for Mystic Invest's German cruise brand, Nicko cruises.

The ship is able to use shore power since a drydock in 2025.

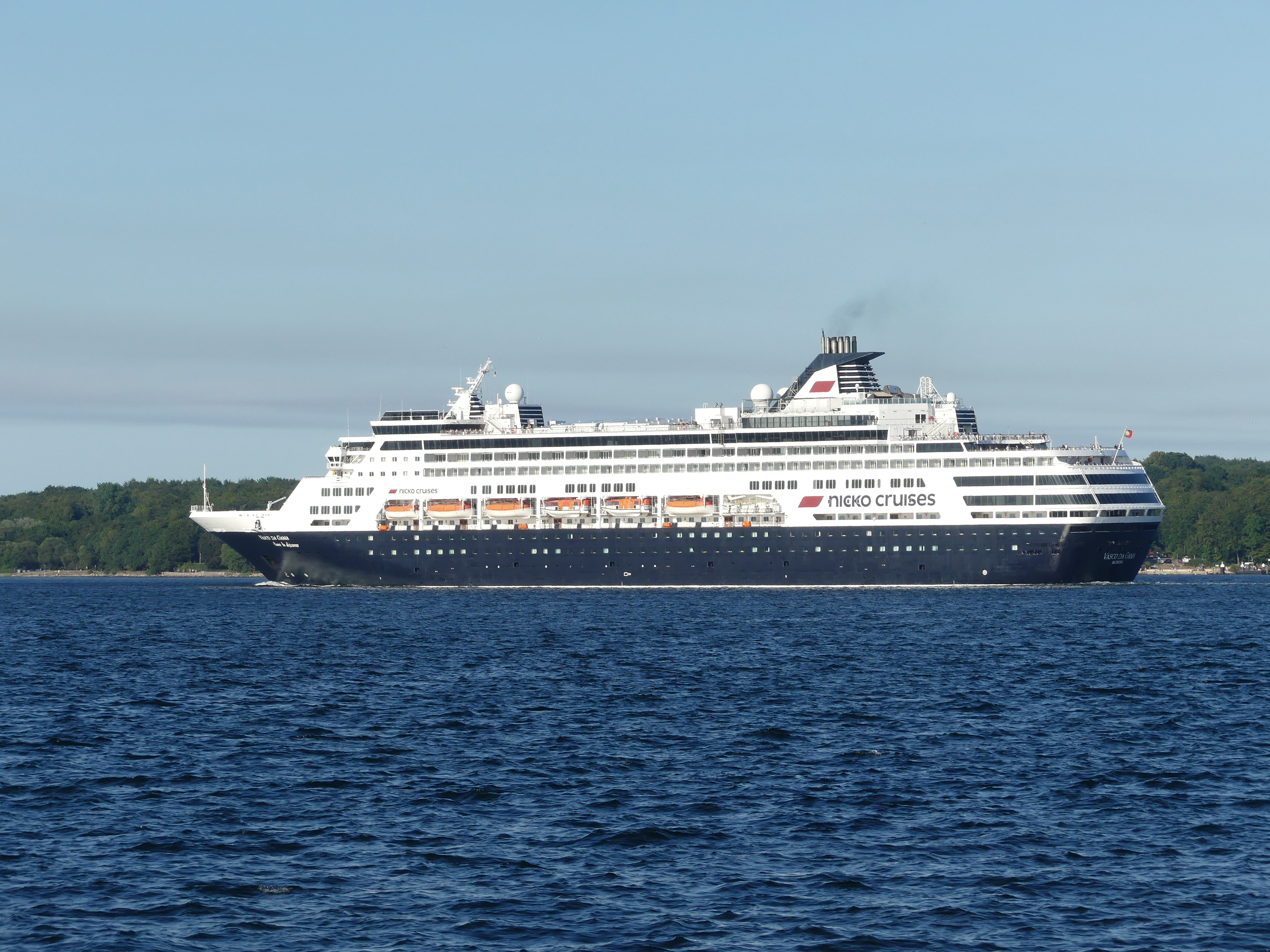
Nicko cruises' Vasco da Gama leaving Kiel, 2023
