= Cruise & Maritime Voyages =

British passenger shipping company

- Industry: Travel and tourism
- Founded: January 2010
- Defunct: 20 July 2020
- Fate: Administration
- Area served: Australia; United Kingdom; United States
- Products: Cruises
- Number of employees: 200–500
- Subsidiaries: Transocean Tours
- Website: www.cruiseandmaritime.com

Cruise & Maritime Voyages (CMV) was a British passenger shipping company headquartered in Purfleet, England. The company ceased operations in 2020 and entered administration.

== History ==
Cruise & Maritime Voyages was formed in 2009, by parent organisation Cruise & Maritime Services International, after their German based Transocean Tours (for whom they were the UK representative) filed for bankruptcy.

Cruise & Maritime Voyages positioned itself as "Providing ex-UK 'no fly' cruising holidays aboard smaller and medium-sized classic and more traditional style ships." The company served an adult market, with an onboard style of traditional entertainment, dining and rooms using a fleet of older vessels.

In December 2019, it was announced that the company acquired two new ships, P&O Cruises Australia's Pacific Dawn and Pacific Aria.

In March 2020, due to the COVID-19 pandemic, Cruise & Maritime Voyages temporarily halted operations, with the majority of ships laid up in Tilbury. On the 23 June 2020, five ships within the CMV fleet were detained by the Maritime & Coastguard Agency, including the MV Columbus, Vasco da Gama, MV Astoria, MS Astor, and MS Marco Polo, over crew welfare concerns after inspections revealed "expired and invalid seafarers employment agreements, late payment of wages and crews who had been on board for over 12 months." The MS Magellan was also inspected by the Agency but was not detained.

Sky News reported on 15 July 2020 that the company was facing insolvency and was in talks with VGO Capital Management, which Sky described as "a special situations investor with expertise in the shipping industry", for additional financing. The company had previously sought a financing agreement with private equity firm Novalpina Capital; this attempt failed after Barclays declined to offer the company a state-backed loan. Attempts to secure financing failed, and the company, including its German subsidiary, entered administration with Duff & Phelps Ltd. on 20 July 2020, with all trading ceased and all sales offices closed with immediate effect.

It was reported on 19 August 2020 that the company's ships were actively for sale on the secondhand market, and that the Administrators were "said to be struggling with crew repatriation." In November, at an auction sale, the company's fleet (excepting Astoria, which the company operated under charter from Banco Montepio of Lisbon) was sold for $ 23.4 million.

Just a few weeks before the outbreak of the pandemic, in November and December 2019, three ships of the fleet, the Marco Polo, the Magellan and the Astor underwent a maintenance and repair programme at Damen Shipyard in Amsterdam.

== Former Fleet ==
The following ships were operated or were scheduled to be operated by Cruise & Maritime Voyages.

Ship	Class	Built	In service for CMV	Tonnage	Flag	Notes	Image
Marco Polo	Ivan Franko class	1965	2010–2020	22,080 GT and 19,860 GRT	Bahamas	In 2009, the ship was chartered for cruising as the line's first ship and was operated as an adults-only (16 and above) vessel, with multiple departure points in the UK along with a range of itineraries. After CMV entered administration, she was sold for $ 2.8 million. Plans to return her to service or to become a floating hotel in Dubai came to nothing. After a period moored in the Persian Gulf, the ship was sold for scrapping at Alang, India in January 2021.	
Ocean Countess	N/A	1975	2010-2012	7,593 GT	Portugal	In 2010, the ship was chartered as the second ship of the fleet. Replaced in 2012 by the Discovery and subsequently sold for scrap in 2013 after a fire destroyed the ship.	
MV Discovery	N/A	1971	2013–2014	20,216 GT	Bermuda	Ship entered the fleet in February 2013, replacing the Ocean Countess. She was sold for scrapping at Alang, India as Amen in October 2014.	
MS Astor	N/A	1987	2013–2020	20,704 GT	Bahamas	The ship was due to leave the Transocean Tours fleet in May 2021 and was to have been refurbished and renamed Jules Verne, after which she would have sailed out of Le Havre and Marseille for Cruise & Maritime Voyages's new French brand. After CMV entered administration, she was sold at auction for $1.7 million and was scrapped at Aliağa, Turkey in 2020.	
Astoria	N/A	1948	2015–2020	15,614 GRT	Portugal	Chartered from Portuscale Cruises to replace the slightly larger Discovery. Prior to Cruise & Maritime Voyages entering administration, Astoria was scheduled to leave the CMV fleet in October 2020. The ship was subsequently returned to Banco Montepio, her Lisbon-based owner. She arrived at Ghent for scrapping in 2025.	
Magellan	Holiday class	1985	2015–2020	46,052 GT	Bahamas	Transferred from Ibero Cruises in 2015, she served as the flagship of the fleet until 2017. After CMV entered administration, she was sold at auction to Seajets for $3.4 million. In January 2021 the ship was resold for scrapping at Alang, India, as Mages.	
Columbus	N/A	1989	2017–2020	63,500 GT	Bahamas	Formerly sailed as the Pacific Pearl for P&O Australia. Became CMV's flagship upon entering the fleet on 11 June 2017. After CMV entered administration, she was sold at auction to Seajets for $5.3 million and later resold for scrapping.	
Vasco da Gama	Statendam class	1993	2019–2020	55,451 GT	Bahamas	Sold to Cruise & Maritime Voyages in 2018; formerly Pacific Eden and Statendam. Sailed for part of the year under the Transocean Tours brand in Europe, and under the Cruise & Maritime Voyages brand in Australia in the summer, replacing Astor. After CMV entered administration, she was sold at auction to Mystic Invest for $10.2 million.	
Amy Johnson	Crown Class	1991	2021 (planned but never entered service)	70,285 GT	N/A	Sold to CMV in 2019 by P&O Cruises Australia, where she was sailing as Pacific Dawn, with planned delivery in 2021. After CMV entered administration, P&O sold her to Ocean Builders, which planned to rename her Satoshi and convert her into a floating hotel in Panama.	
Ida Pfeiffer	Statendam class	1994	2021 (planned but never entered service)	55,819 GT	N/A	Sold to CMV in 2019 by P&O Cruises Australia, where she was sailing as Pacific Aria, with planned delivery in 2021. After CMV entered administration, P&O sold her to Seajets.	
