= Orient Lines =

Former cruise line

- Company type: Subsidiary
- Industry: Cruise line
- Founded: 1991
- Founder: Gerry Herrod
- Defunct: 2008
- Key people: Wayne Heller
- Parent: Norwegian Cruise Line (1998–2000); Star Cruises (2000–2008); Origin Cruise Group (2008—present)
- Website: orientlines.com

Orient Lines was a cruise line specialising in exotic destinations that was in operation 1993–2008. The brand was founded in 1993 by Gerry Herrod, and was sold to Norwegian Cruise Line in 1998. It ceased operations in March 2008 and was sold to new owners in June 2008. Operations were planned to be restarted in April 2009; however, due to the Great Recession of 2008, the re-launch of the Orient Lines brand was put on hold and eventually cancelled.

== History ==
The history of Orient Lines began in 1991 when Shipping & General Ltd, owned by Gerry Herrod, acquired the cruise ship Alexandr Pushkin from Far Eastern Shipping Company. During the next two and a half years the Alexandr Pushkin was almost entirely rebuilt and emerged in 1993 as the Marco Polo for the new Orient Lines brand, embarking on a varied program with cruises all around the world.

In 1998, Norwegian Cruise Line (NCL) acquired the brand. In 1999, NCL itself was acquired by Star Cruises. Following this, NCL's Norwegian Crown joined the Orient Lines fleet in May 2000 under the name Crown Odyssey. In March 2001 Star Cruises announced that their SuperStar Aries would be joining the Orient Lines fleet in mid-2002 as the Ocean Voyager. This plan was shelved however, and in 2003, the Crown Odyssey returned to the NCL fleet and Orient Lines reverted to operating with just one ship.

On 4 June 2007, the Marco Polo was sold to the Greece-based Global Maritime, with a delivery date on 31 March 2008. Without its only ship sold and no other ships to replace it, the Orient Line brand ceased to operate.

On 27 June 2008, Star Cruises sold the Orient Line brand to Origin Cruise Group, owned by Wayne Heller. The new owners stated they would be restarting operations with several second-hand ships with a capacity of 600 to 800 passengers. The first ship acquired by the "new" Orient Lines was SS Maxim Gorkiy, which was purchased from Sovcomflot on 20 August 2008. The Maxim Gorkiy was due to enter service with Orient Lines in April 2009 as SS Marco Polo II. On 19 November 2008 Wayne Heller stated that due to the Great Recession of 2008, the relaunch of the Orient Lines brand was delayed indefinitely. The Maxim Gorkiy never was refitted and renamed Marco Polo II. The ship was sold for scrap in January 2009. No further announcements have been made regarding the future of the Orient Lines, though the trademarks are still owned by Origin Cruise Group. In 2019, the abandoned website was taken down due to the domain expiring.

== Former Ships ==
Ship	Built	In service for Orient Lines	Tonnage	Status as of 2023	Image
Marco Polo	1965	1993–2008	22,080 GT	Scrapped in 2021 at Alang, India	
Crown Odyssey	1988	2000–2003	34,242 GT	Since 2008 sailing as Balmoral for Fred. Olsen Cruise Line	
Marco Polo II Never Officially Named	1969	Never entered service (Planned to enter service on 15 April 2009).	24,981 GRT	Scrapped in Alang, India	
Ocean Voyager Never Officially Named	1981	Never entered service (Planned to enter service in 2002).	37,049 GRT	Since 2011 sailing as Saga Sapphire for Saga Cruises	
