= MS Astor =

Cruise ship (1986–2021)

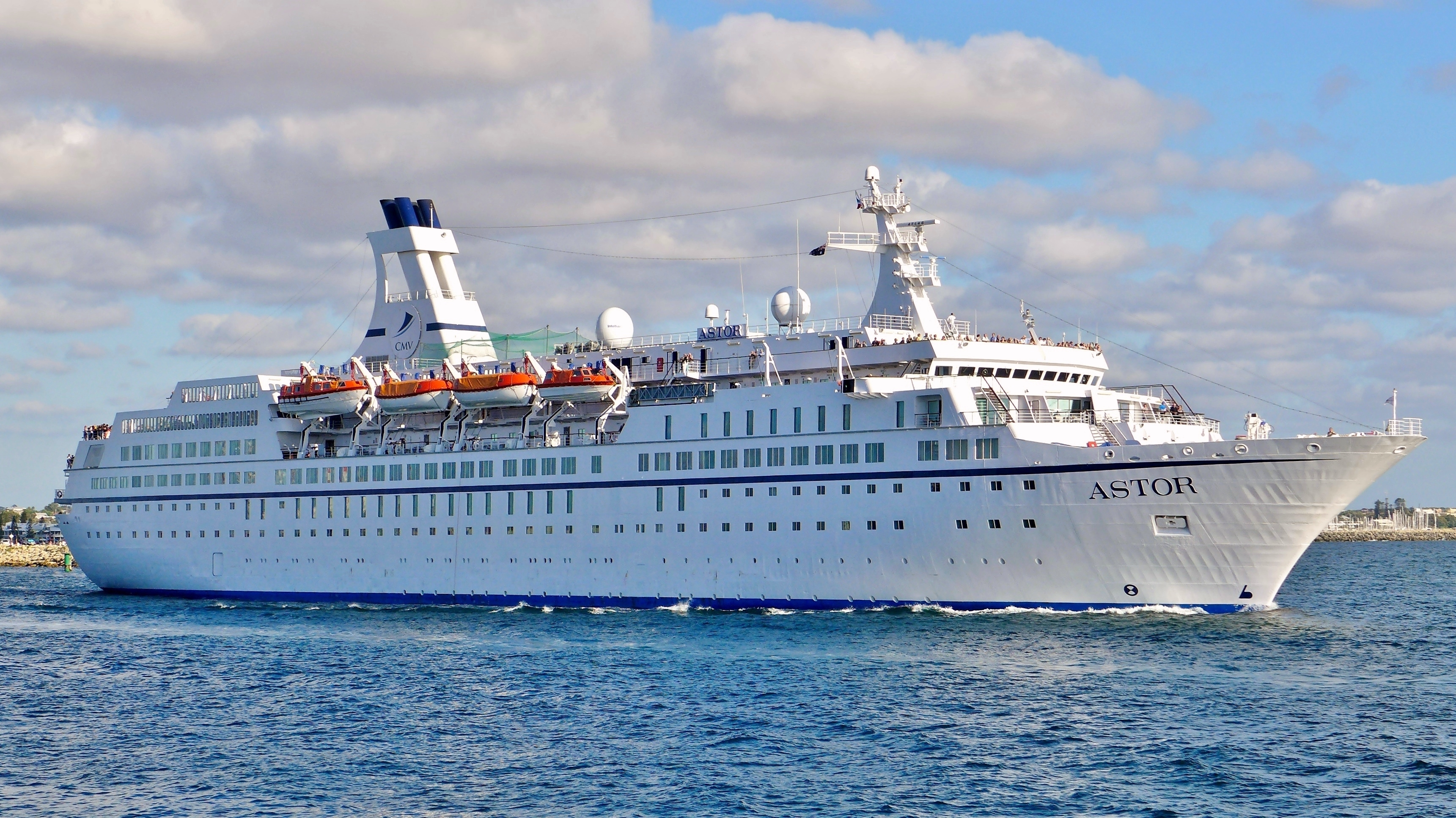
- Astor in Fremantle Harbour in 2016

History
- Name: 1987–1988: Astor; 1988–1995: Fedor Dostoyevskiy; 1995–2020: Astor
- Namesake: Fyodor Dostoevsky (2nd name)
- Owner: 1987–1988: Marlan Corporation; 1988–1991: Black Sea Shipping Company; 1991–1996: Fedor Dostoevskiy Shipping Co; 1996–2008: Astor Shipping Co; 2008–2014: Premicon; 2014–2020: Global Maritime Group
- Operator: 1987–1988: Marlan Corporation; 1988–1990: Transocean Tours; 1990–1995: Neckermann Seereisen; 1995–1996: Aquamarin; 1996–2013: Transocean Tours; 2013–2020: Cruise & Maritime Voyages
- Port of registry: 1987–1988: Port Louis, Mauritius; 1988–1991: Odesa, Soviet Union; 1992–2020: Nassau Bahamas
- Ordered: 1985
- Builder: HDW, Kiel, West Germany
- Cost: $65 million
- Yard number: 218
- Launched: 30 May 1986
- Acquired: 14 January 1987
- Maiden voyage: 14 January 1987
- In service: 14 January 1987
- Identification: Call sign: C6JR3; IMO number: 8506373; MMSI number: 308214000
- Fate: Scrapped January 2021

General characteristics
- Type: Cruise ship
- Tonnage: 20,704 GT; 3,780 DWT
- Length: 176.25 m (578 ft 3 in)
- Beam: 22.60 m (74 ft 2 in)
- Draught: 6.15 m (20 ft 2 in)
- Decks: 7 (passenger accessible)
- Installed power: Four Sulzer-Wärtsilä diesel engines; 15,400 kW (combined)
- Propulsion: Two propellers
- Speed: 18 knots (33 km/h; 21 mph)
- Capacity: 650 passengers
- Crew: 300

MS Astor was a cruise ship that most recently sailed for Cruise & Maritime Voyages' Transocean Cruises subsidiary, under which she operated voyages to Europe, South Africa, and Australia.

The ship was originally built in 1987 under the name Astor by Howaldtswerke-Deutsche Werft (HDW), Kiel in West Germany for the Mauritius based Marlan Corporation, although originally ordered by the South African Safmarine as a combined ocean liner/cruise ship for the Southampton-Cape Town service.

In 1988, she was sold to the Soviet Union-based Black Sea Shipping Company and renamed Fedor Dostoevskiy (some sources spell the name Fedor Dostoyevskiy, Russian: Фёдор Достое́вский), but spent her time under charter to various West German cruise lines. In 1995, she reverted to the name, Astor. From 1996 until 2020, she operated under charter to Transocean Tours.

After Transocean Cruises' parent company, Cruise & Maritime Voyages, entered administration in 2020, Astor was sold for scrap.

== Concept and construction ==
The South African Safmarine had restarted ocean liner service between Southampton and Cape Town in 1984 by acquiring the 1981-built cruise ship Astor from the West German Hadag Cruise Line. In service the first Astor's engines proved too underpowered to maintain liner service. As a result, Safmarine decided to order a new ship in 1985 from the HDW shipyard in Kiel, based on the same design as the 1981 Astor (which had been built at HDW's yard at Hamburg) but with additional facilities and more powerful engines, making her better suited for liner operations as well as cruising. Confusingly the new ship was also decided to be named Astor. Even though the second Astor was not to be delivered until 1987, the first Astor was sold to the East German Deutsche Seerederei (via a West German intermediary) in 1985. Soon after this Safmarine decided to abandon their passenger operations, and in January 1986 the second Astor's construction contract was sold to the Mauritius-based Marlan Corporation. The ship was launched from dry dock on 30 May 1986 and delivered to the Marlan Corporation on 14 January 1987.

== Service history ==
=== 1987–1988: Astor ===
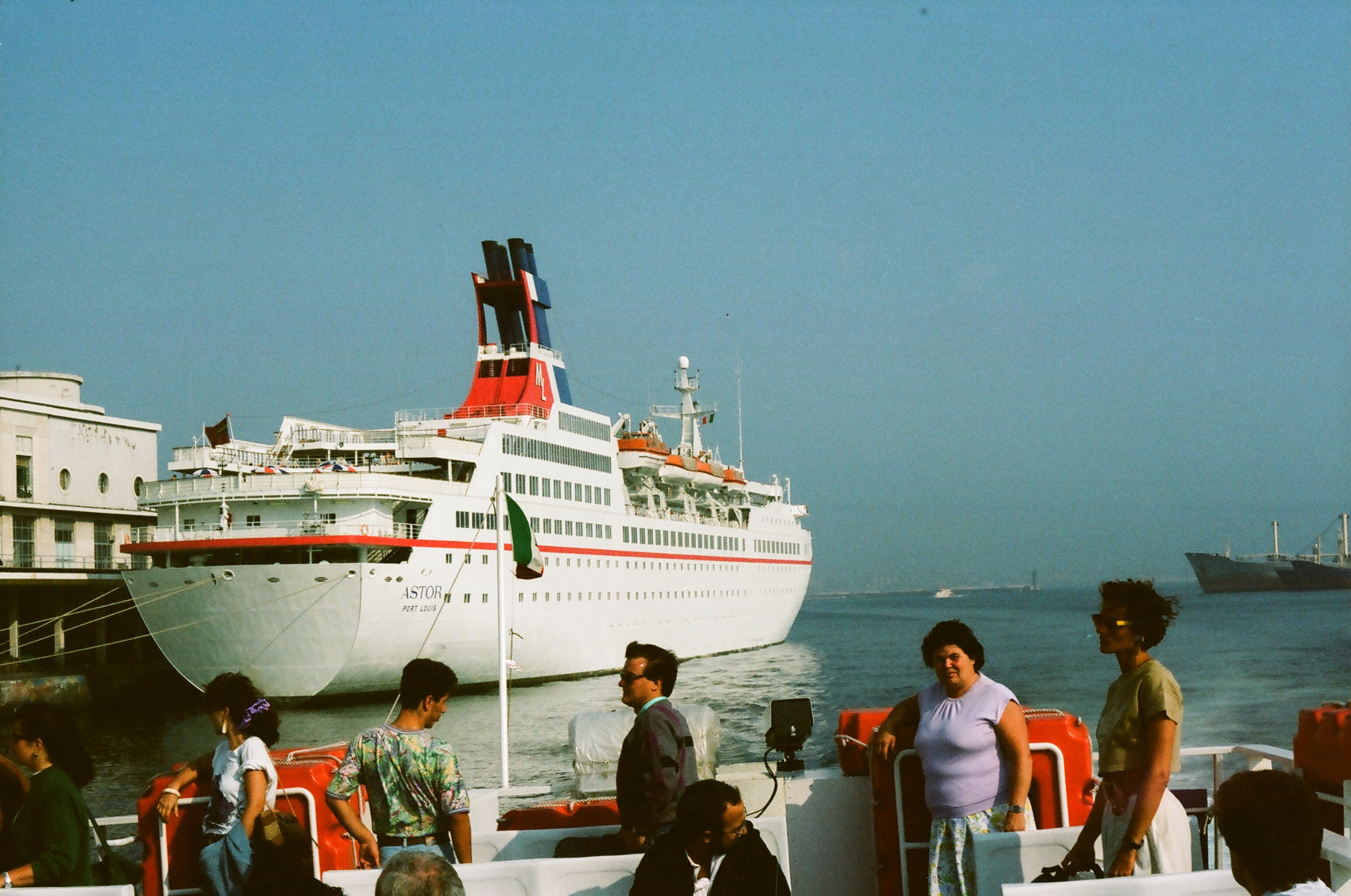
Astor at Molo Beverello, Naples in October 1988

Immediately following delivery on 14 January 1987, the Astor set on her maiden voyage from Hamburg to Genoa and from there further to South America. After this she was used for cruising on the Caribbean and to other destinations around the world.

=== 1988–1995: Fedor Dostoevskiy ===
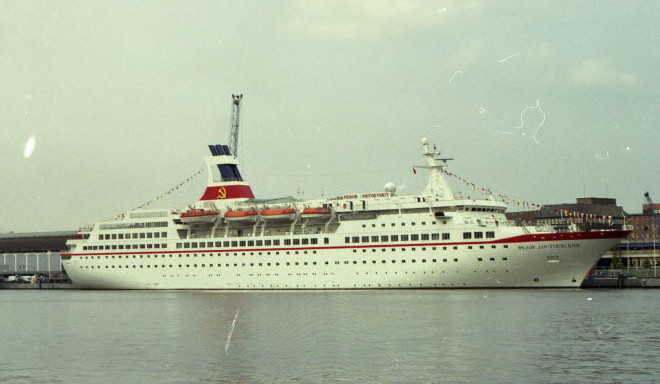
Fedor Dostoevskiy in c.1990

On 3 October 1988 Marlan Corporation sold the Astor to the Soviet Union-based Black Sea Shipping Company. Renamed Feodor Dostoevskiy and re-registered to the Soviet Union, the ship was chartered to the West German Transocean Tours in December 1988. She stayed in Transocean Tours service until March 1990, when she was chartered to Neckermann Seereisen. Following the collapse of the Soviet Union in 1991, the Feodor Dostoevskiy's ownership was transferred to Fedor Dostoevskiy Shipping Co., a Bahamas-based company, and re-registered in the Bahamas. Apart from the change of flag, this had no effect in her operations.

=== 1995–2020: Astor (again) ===
Following the end of Feodor Dostoevskiy's charter to Neckermann Seereisen, she was chartered to Aquamarin in December 1995 and reverted to the name Astor. In 1996 the ship was sold to Astor Shipping Co., and again chartered to Transocean Tours. At some point prior to 2008, she was acquired by Germany-based Premicon, but continued to operate for Transocean under charter.

On 28 November 2008, the German Navy reportedly prevented Somali pirate speedboats from attacking Astor. She was sailing in the Gulf of Oman en route from Sharm-al-Sheikh in Egypt to Dubai, when the German Brandenburg-class frigate Mecklenburg-Vorpommern detected pirate speedboats apparently attempting to attack Astor. Mecklenburg-Vorpommern entered the path of the oncoming speedboats while they were still some three miles from Astor. Warning bursts of machine gun fire were used to ward off the threat without those on the cruise ship becoming aware of the situation.

In February 2013, Astor was chartered for three years, commencing in 2013, by Cruise and Maritime Voyages (CMV) in a bid to fill the "gap" in the Australian market after the exit of Classic International Cruises.

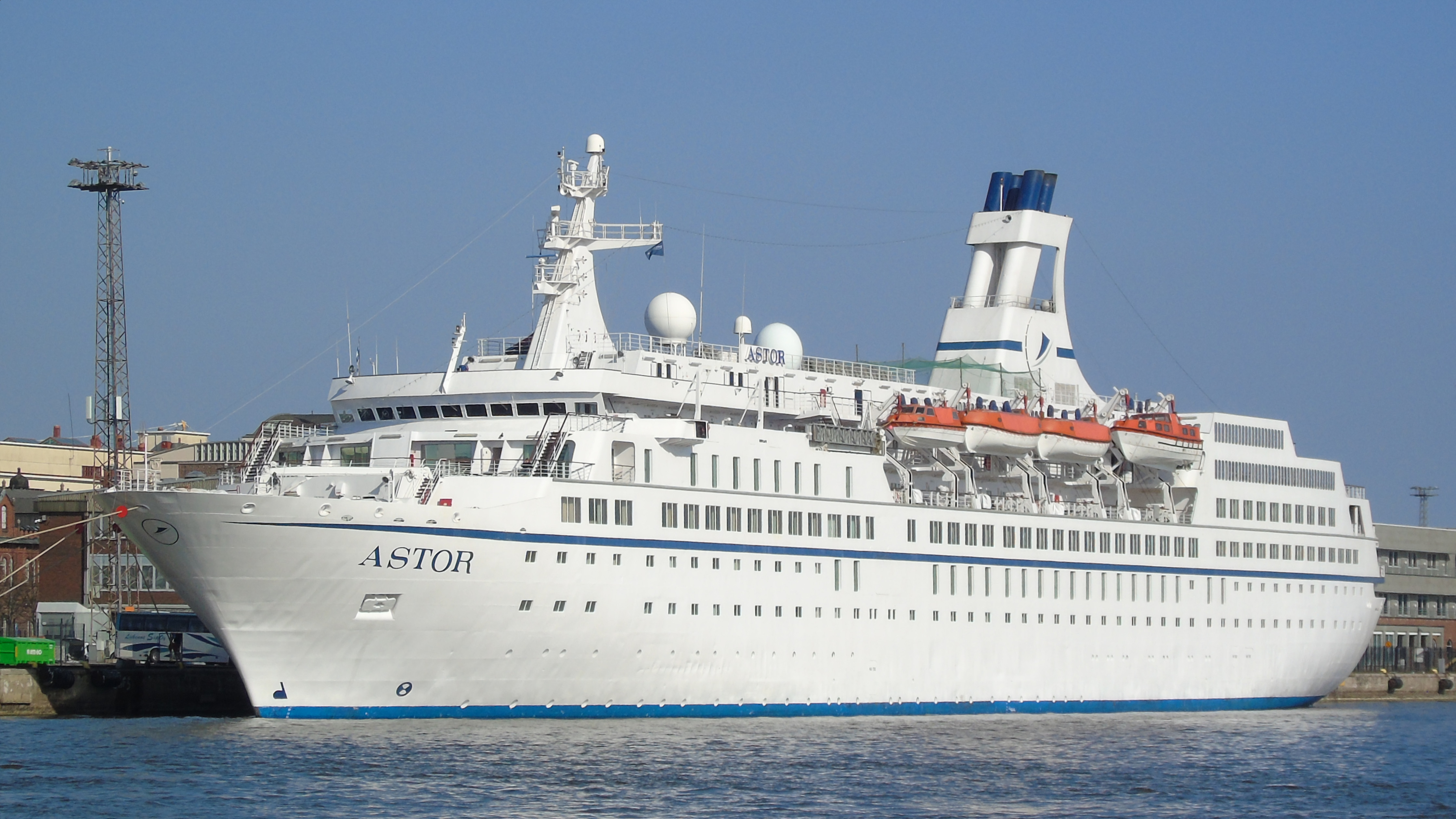
Astor at Helsinki in 2019.

In December 2014, Cruise & Maritime Voyages purchased the vessel from its bankrupt owners, Premicon. The vessel planned to sail a winter 2015 season with Cruise & Maritime Voyages before briefly moving back to the fleet of Transocean where she sailed a summer season from Germany before switching back to CMV for the winter 2016 season.

In 2019, Cruise & Maritime Voyages announced it would rename Astor to Jules Verne and would deploy the ship in the French market beginning in May 2021. However, Cruise & Maritime Voyages entered administration in 2020 due to the COVID-19 pandemic, and the ship was sold at auction by London-based C W Kellock on 15 October 2020 for $1,710,000. She was beached in Aliaga, Turkey, on 23 November 2020 for scrap. Scrapping started four days later and was completed by 30 March 2021.

== Design ==
=== Exterior design ===
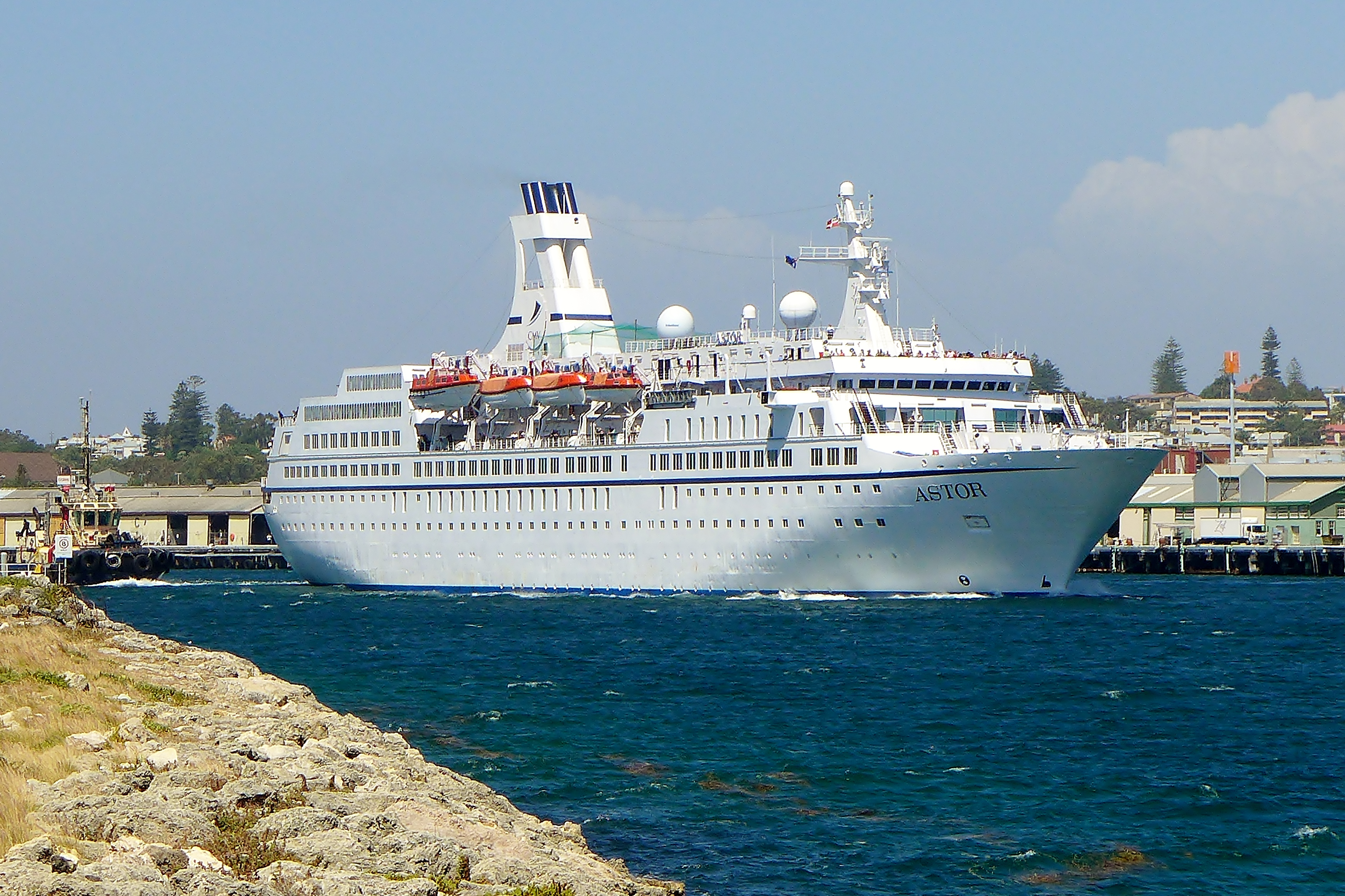
Astor departing Fremantle Harbour in December 2014

Externally, the 1987-built Astor was designed to be almost identical to the Astor of 1981, but approximately 12 metres (39 ft) longer. Due to the similar design the ships were distinguishable only due to the additional windows below the first lifeboat on the 1987 ship. Both Astors were designed with a sharply raked bow, a relatively low, terraced superstructure and a large, square funnel.

In Marlan Corporation service, Astor was initially painted with a white hull and superstructure, a red decorative stripe separating the hull and superstructure, and red/blue funnel with a large white cross painted on it alongside the letters ML. This was later altered so that the decorative stripe was extended to cover the entire lowest superstructure deck, while the funnel was painted white with red stripes. As Feodor Dostoevskiy, the decorative stripe on the hull reverted to the same form as in the original livery, while the funnel was painted white with blue exhaust pipes and a wide red stripe carrying the hammer and sickle emblem.

In Transocean Tours service the ship received a livery with a narrower light/dark blue decorative stripe on the hull, a white funnel with blue exhaust pipes, a thin light/dark blue stripe with Transocean Tours' large T logo in the middle.

=== Interior design ===
As with the exterior, the interior layout and decorations of the 1987-built Astor were very similar to the 1981-built Astor, down to the bathroom fittings. However, the 1987-built ship was designed with a larger number of suites, improved crew quarters, an added casino and added conference facilities.

Like the 1981-built ship, the 1987-built Astor was furnished in traditional style using large amounts of dark wood, with many of the public rooms having high ceilings.

=== Decks and facilities ===
As Astor in Transocean Tours service, seven decks were accessible to passengers. Facilities included dining areas, sauna, indoor and outdoor swimming pools, a gym and a showlounge.
