= MS Marco Polo =

Cruise ship

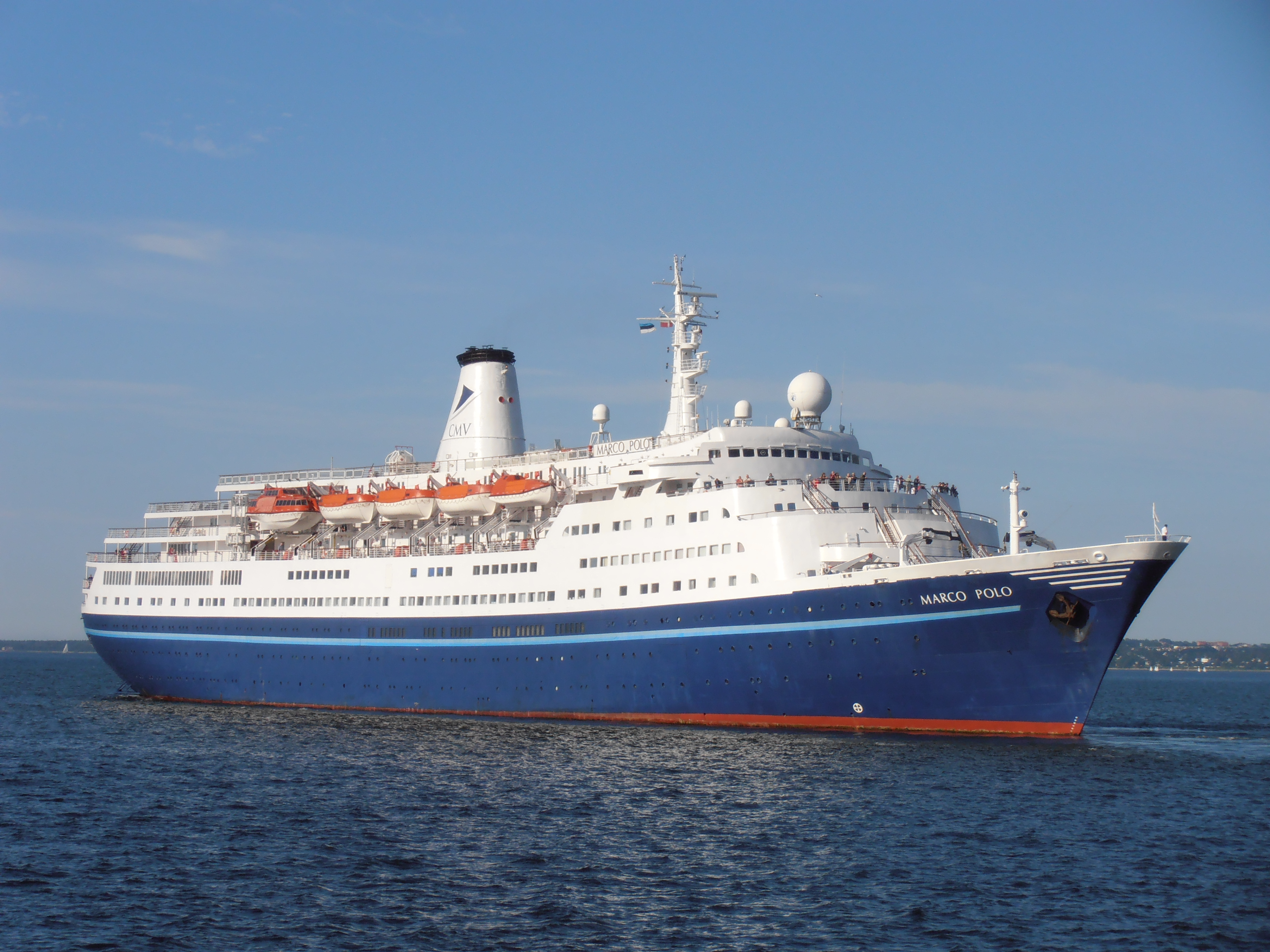
- MS Marco Polo in the port of Tallinn in 2012

History
- Name: Aleksandr Pushkin (1965–1991); Marco Polo (1991–2021)
- Namesake: Alexander Pushkin (first name); Marco Polo (second name)
- Owner: 1965–1985: Baltic Shipping Company; 1985–1991: Far Eastern Shipping Company; 1991–2008: Orient Lines; 2008–2021–: Story Cruise; 2021: NKD Maritime
- Operator: 1965–1979: Baltic Shipping Company; 1979–1985: Transocean Tours; 1985–1990: CTC Cruises; 1990–1993: laid up/rebuilt; 1993–2008: Orient Lines; 2008–2010: Transocean Tours; 2010–2020: Cruise & Maritime Voyages
- Port of registry: 1965–1984: Leningrad, Soviet Union; 1984–1991: Vladivostok, Soviet Union; 1991–2021: Nassau, Bahamas; 2021: Zanzibar, Tanzania
- Builder: VEB Mathias-Thesen-Werft, Wismar, East Germany
- Yard number: 126
- Laid down: 18 June 1963
- Launched: 26 April 1964
- Completed: 1965
- Acquired: 14 August 1965
- In service: August 1965
- Out of service: 2020
- Identification: Call sign: C6JZ7; IMO number: 6417097; MMSI number: 308693000
- Fate: Scrapped in Alang, India, 2021

General characteristics (as built)
- Class & type: Ivan Franko-class passenger ship → Ocean liner
- Tonnage: 19,860 GRT; 22,080 GT; 5,180 DWT
- Length: 176.28 m (578.35 ft)
- Beam: 23.55 m (77.26 ft)
- Draught: 8.20 m (26.90 ft)
- Depth: 13.50 m (44.29 ft)
- Ice class: 1C passenger ship
- Installed power: 2 × Sulzer-Cegielski 7RD76; 15,447 kW (combined)
- Propulsion: Two shafts; fixed pitch propellers
- Speed: 20.5 knots (38.0 km/h; 23.6 mph)
- Capacity: 650 passengers with berths (different sources give different figures) + 500 deck passengers
- Crew: 220

General characteristics (circa 2007)
- Type: Cruise Ship
- Tonnage: 22,080 GT
- Speed: 19.5 knots (36.1 km/h; 22.4 mph)
- Capacity: 820 passengers; Previously listed as 915 passengers
- Crew: 356
- Notes: Otherwise same as built

MS Marco Polo was a cruise ship. She was originally built as ocean liner Aleksandr Pushkin in 1965 by Mathias-Thesen-Werft, East Germany for the Baltic Shipping Company. After major alterations and additions, the ship operated as Marco Polo for the Orient Lines from 1993 to 2008. It last sailed for Cruise & Maritime Voyages and its German subsidiary Transocean Tours. After Cruise & Maritime Voyages entered administration in 2020 due to the COVID-19 pandemic, it was sold at auction for US$2.8 million on 22 October 2020; it was subsequently resold and in January 2021 was beached at Alang, India and scrapped.

== Design and construction ==
Aleksandr Pushkin was constructed at VEB Mathias-Thesen-Werft in Wismar, East Germany. She was the second ship of the Ivan Franko class (also referred to as "poet" or "writer" class), named after the Russian poet Alexander Pushkin. The construction of this class featured some notable differences from contemporary ships built in the west. Amongst other things they offered cabins for six people and had three taps in the bathrooms - for hot, cold and sea water - Both of these features had long since been abandoned in western liners. The ships also featured certain forward-looking features, such as all outside accommodation for both passengers and the crew, and an indoor/outdoor swimming pool with a sliding glass roof. To enable the ships to navigate through broken ice, they were constructed with greater hull strength and stability than usual in passenger ships of this size. The Ivan Franko-class ships were built with use as troopships in mind. Due to this they had unusually large provision and storage areas, enabling a cruising range of over 10,000 nautical miles (19,000 km). As a more visible sign of potential military use, the ships were equipped with unusually powerful deck lifting gear, apparently to be able to transport armoured vehicles on board. As built, the ship carried between 650 and 766 passengers in two classes, with different sources providing different figures. Additionally there were provisions for 500 cabinless passengers.

According to a deck plan printed for the passenger agency of Helsinki in 1971, the Alexandr Pushkin could carry 668 passengers, 520 in Tourist Class and 148 in First Class. Tourist Class cabin were furnished with either two or four bunks, one or two wardrobe, a sofa, a table and one or two chairs, along with a washing basin; the sanitary facilities were shared among the passengers. These rooms were located on the four lowest decks (B/Promenade Deck, C/Main Deck, Second and Third Deck). In First Class, all staterooms were furnished with two beds or a "sofa bed and upper pullman berth", a table, a chair, a sofa and a nightstand. They also had a private bathroom with a shower, a toilet and a washing basin. Staterooms 101 to 104 on the Boat Deck, looking towards the bow, were deluxe ones, with a desk and its armchair, their own telephone as well as a bath instead of a shower. On the rear of the Promenade Deck were located staterooms 277 and 279, sharing their full bathroom as these two had baby cribs. All cabins had portholes or windows. For the passenger facilities, they were located on the upper decks. The restaurant was on the C deck; on the B Deck you would have the "Kalinka" shop, the gymnasium, the sauna bath as well as the children's play room and swimming pool. The A Deck, or Saloon Deck, was filled with amenities. For the bow to the stern, you would have : the Music Saloon, with its piano and dance floor; the "North Palmyra Café" and the "Café Penguin"; the "Beriozka" shop and an information kiosk, followed by the post counter; the Cinema; the Smoking Saloon with its "Friendship bar" and play room; the Library; the two hairdressers and finally the Swimming Pool and another bar, the "Rusalka bar" (Mermaid's bar). An outside dancing floor was located on the Boat Deck and on the Bridge Deck, there was the Verandah with the "White Nights" bar.

From 1972 onwards the Ivan Franko-class ships were rebuilt. In the first stage the cargo facilities were eliminated and the forward superstructure extended, allowing for additional public spaces. Stabilizers were also installed in this stage. In the second stage the cabins were re-configured to include berths for all passengers. In a refit during the 1970s a discothèque was added on board Aleksandr Pushkin, making her the first Soviet ship to have one.

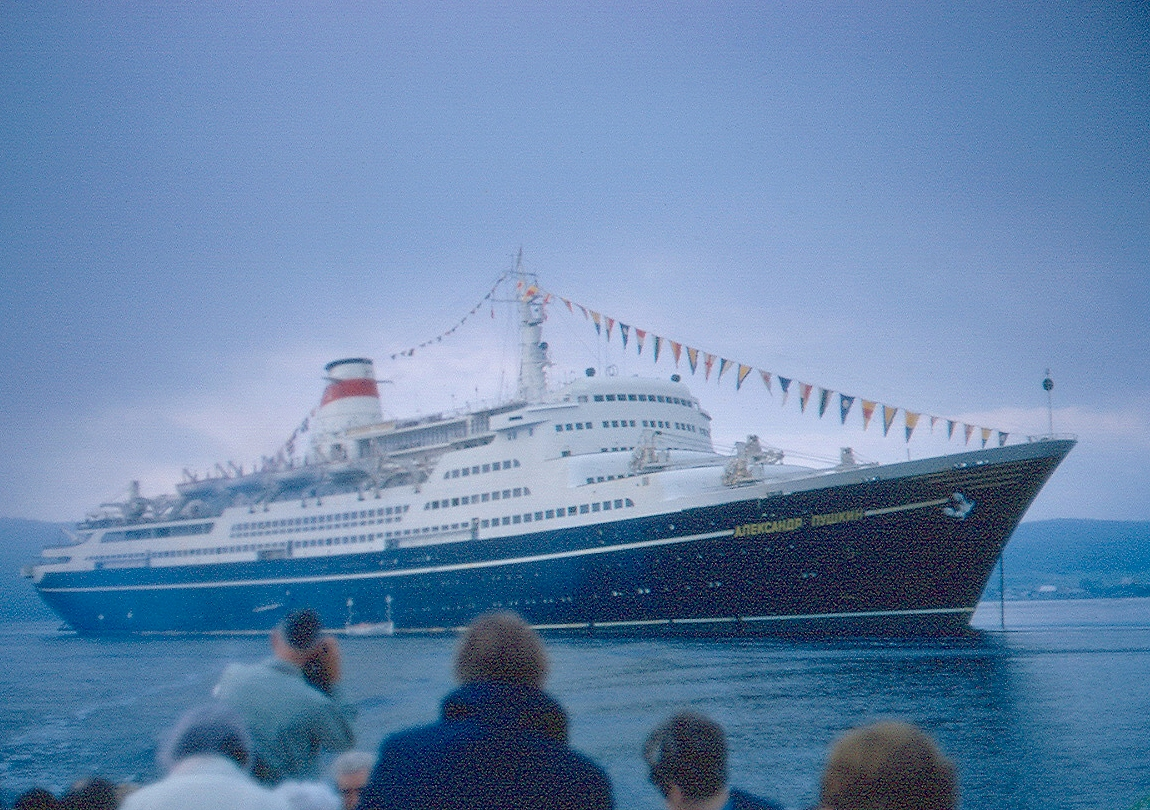
MS Aleksandr Pushkin in the summer of 1970

== Service history ==
=== Service as Aleksandr Pushkin ===
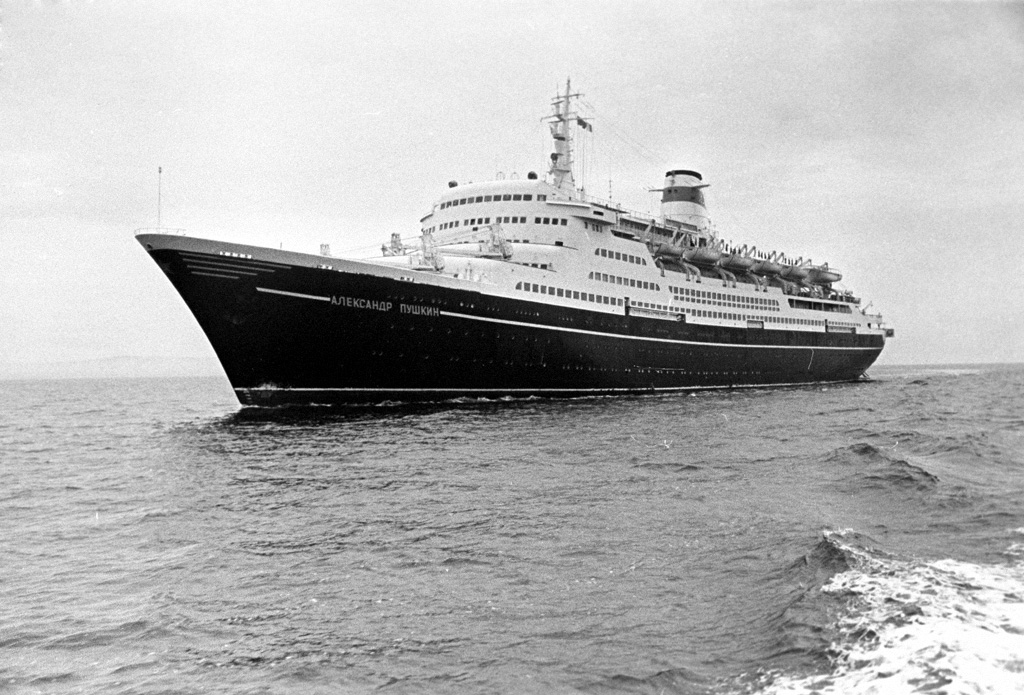
Aleksandr Pushkin

Aleksandr Pushkin entered service in 1965 with the Baltic Shipping Company, one of the three principal Soviet passenger shipping companies (the other two being the Black Sea Shipping Company and the Far Eastern Shipping Company). Reports about her service in the Soviet fleet are fragmentary and conflicting, partly due to some information still being classified by the Russians. Most sources state she was used to inaugurate the Baltic Shipping Company's regular trans-Atlantic service between Montreal, Quebec, Canada and Leningrad, and later on used for cruising. Other sources give a more detailed, but somewhat conflicting, accounts. Philip Dawson's book The Liner - Retrospective & Renaissance gives the full route as Leningrad—Helsinki—Copenhagen—London (Tilbury)—Quebec City—Montreal, in addition to which the ship was used for cruising from Montreal to Saint Pierre and Miquelon, The Bahamas and Cuba during the summer months. According to the book, the ship carried just 36 passengers on her first transatlantic crossing. According to Cruisepage.com, she spent only the summer months on Leningrad—Montreal service, while the rest of the year she was used either on crossing from Leningrad to Havana, Cuba or cruising under charter to western companies. Fakta om Fartyg offers a somewhat different account, stating that the ship originally entered service as a cruise ship in 1965, moving to the Leningrad—Montreal route in only April 1966, then spending summers from 1967 until 1979 in Leningrad—Bremerhaven—Montreal route and the rest of the year cruising, and from 1979 exclusively on cruise traffic. It does seem likely the ship called in Helsinki and London on her transatlantic crossings, as according to an article in Helsingin Sanomat Alexandr Pushkin was popular amongst Finnish passengers sailing to London and Canada; she was the only ship offering crossings from Finland to Canada and the only liner in Helsinki—London service at the time. Although not mentioned in any source, photographic evidence shows that Aleksandr Pushkin's superstructure was enlarged during her 1972 rebuilding, with the forward superstructure expanded and rear promenade decks built in.

Aleksandr Pushkin was chartered to the West Germany-based Transocean Tours in 1979, ending her transatlantic service. At this point she was one of just three passenger liners in transatlantic service, alongside Cunard Line's Queen Elizabeth 2 and Polish Ocean Lines' Stefan Batory. In addition to the liner and cruise service, two sources mention that Alexandr Pushkin was also used in service of the Soviet Navy, particularly in interventions into African countries.

In 1985, her charter to Transocean Tours ended and Aleksandr Pushkin was transferred from the Baltic Shipping Company to the Far Eastern Shipping Company, who promptly chartered her to CTC Cruises for cruising from Europe and Australia. In 1990, her charter to CTC Cruises ended and she was laid up at Singapore. In 1991, the ship was sold to Orient Lines – the brainchild of cruise lines and hotels entrepreneur Gerry Herrod – and renamed Marco Polo.

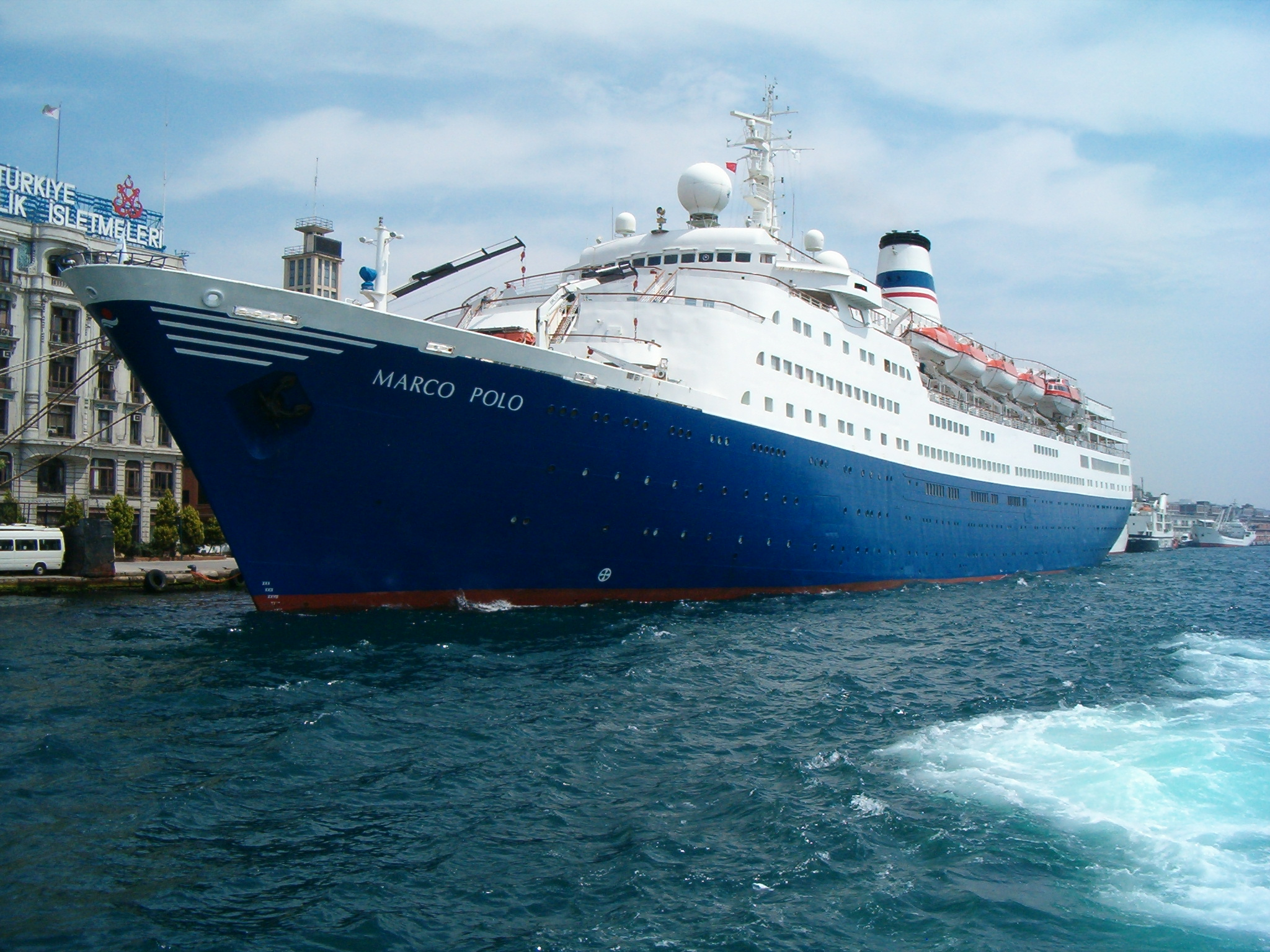
MS Marco Polo in Istanbul in Orient Lines colours, 2003.

=== Service as Marco Polo ===
Following the purchase by Orient Lines, Marco Polo sailed to Neorion Shipyard, Greece, where her engines were reconditioned by Sulzer. Following this she was moved to Perama Shipyard, Greece, where a near-total reconstruction of the ship commenced. Externally this resulted in notable extension of the rear superstructure and heightening of the funnel to maintain the proportions of the ship. Internally the ship was almost entirely rebuilt under the guidance of naval architect Knud Hansen and interior designers Michael and Agni Katzourakis. In addition to the more visual changes, the ship was fitted with Denny Brown stabilizers, additional diesel engines and brought up to the latest IMO and SOLAS standards. The refit took 2½ years; various sources estimate the cost as between US$20m and $60m.

In 1993, following completions of the conversion, Marco Polo began a varying itinerary of cruises all over the world, including more unusual destinations such as South-East Asia, Africa, and Antarctica. In 1998, Orient Lines was sold to Norwegian Cruise Lines. Marco Polo's cruises continued as before, but as a result of the NCL deal Crown Odyssey joined her in the Orient Lines fleet in 2000, turning the company into a two-ship brand. However, Crown Odyssey left the Orient fleet in 2003, and Marco Polo became again the sole ship of the brand. Since 2005 she has also been the sole surviving Ivan Franko-class vessel, the other sisters having sunk or been scrapped.

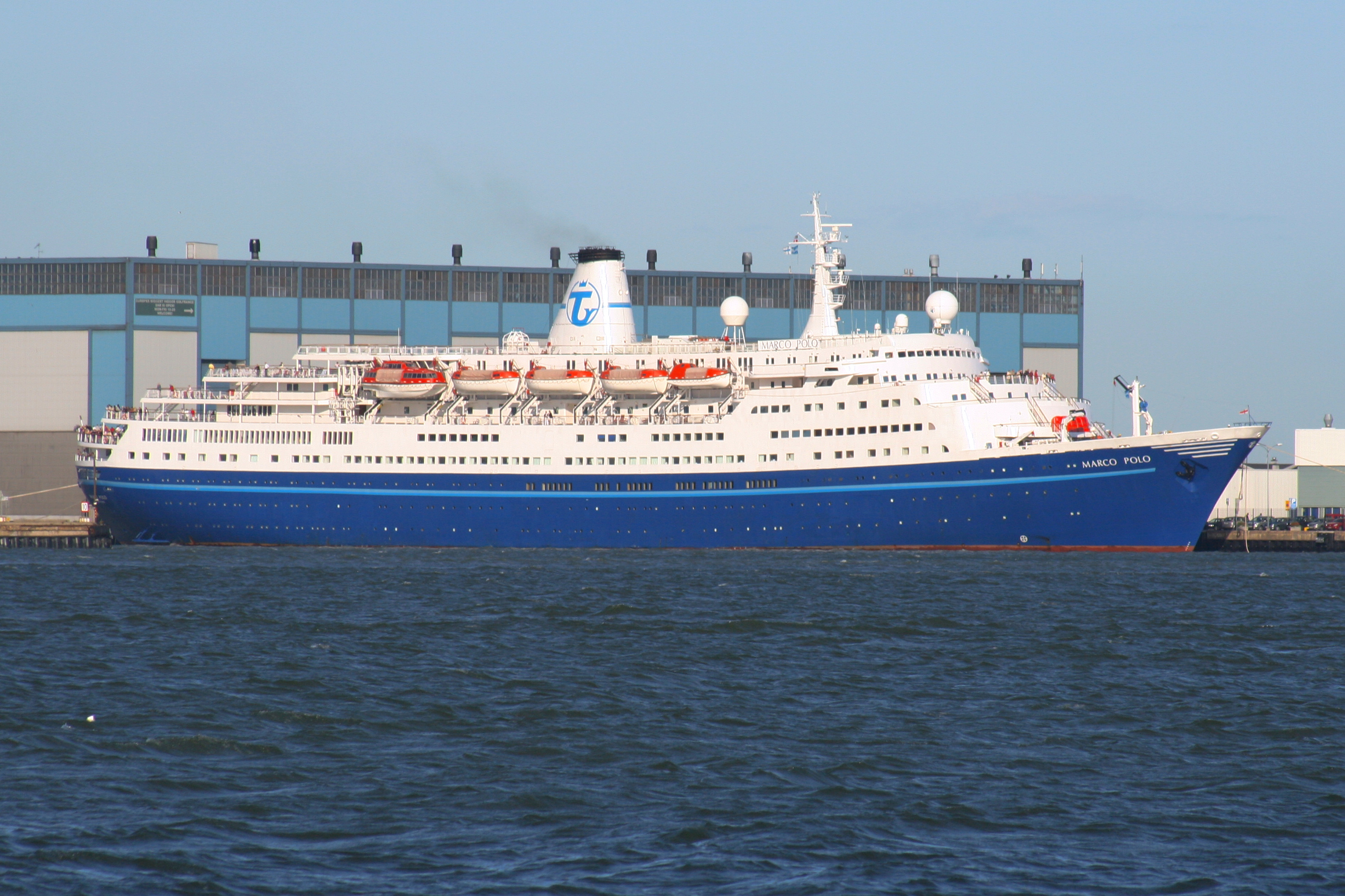
Marco Polo departing Helsinki in 2008 during her service with Transocean Tours.

In 2008 Norwegian Cruise Line sold Marco Polo to the Greece-based Global Maritime Group, which chartered the ship to the Germany-based Transocean Tours. Marco Polo replaced Arielle in the Transocean Tours fleet, operating cruises out of the United Kingdom and Germany. The sale of Marco Polo also meant the end of the Orient Lines brand. Transocean Tours said that they planned to operate the ship until 2012 at least.

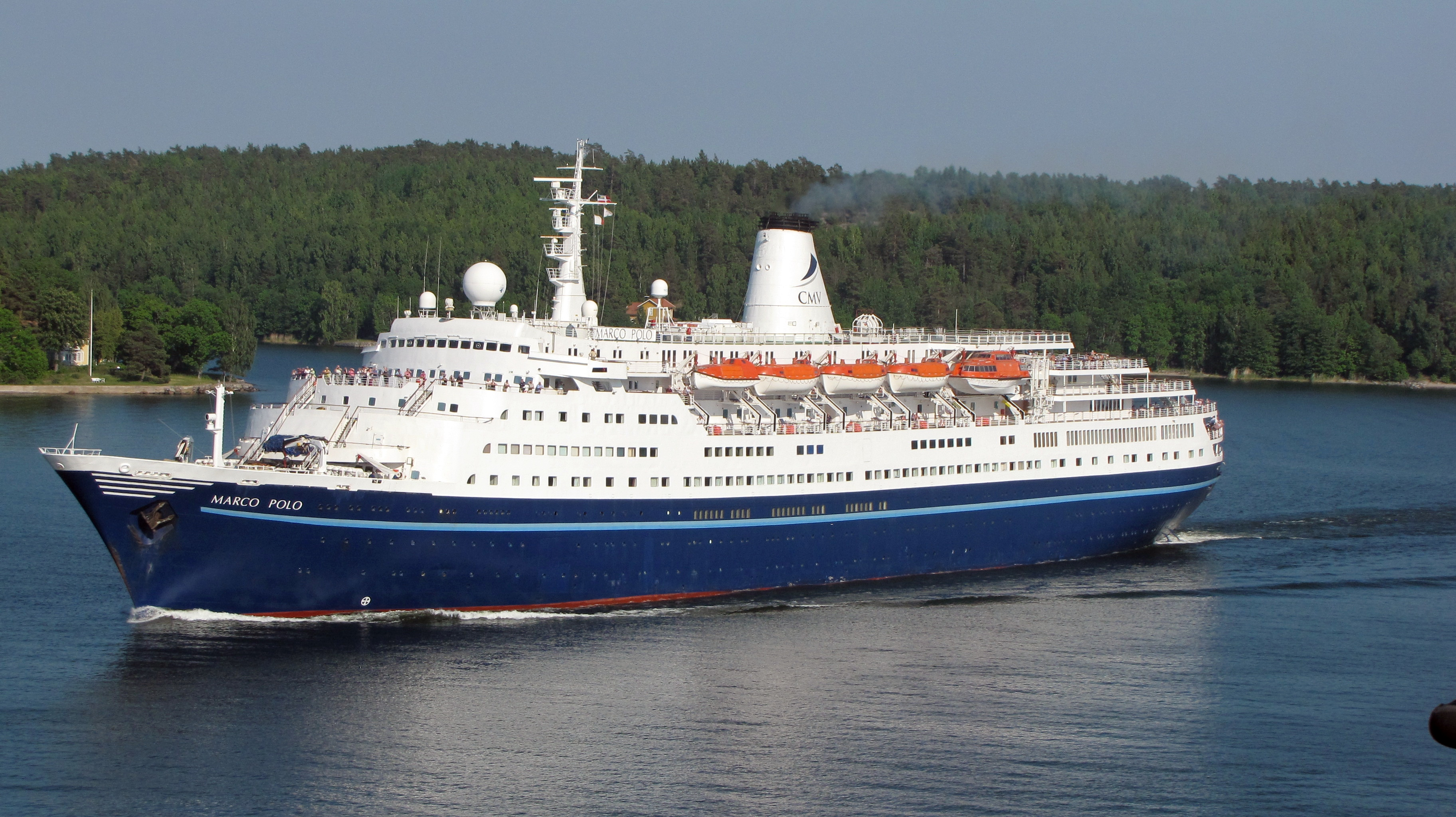
Marco Polo

On 6 July 2009 Marco Polo called at Invergordon, Scotland on a cruise outbound from Tilbury in England. During a health inspection by the local port health officials up to 150 passengers were discovered to have been infected with what was presumed to be norovirus; the number of infected passengers and crew subsequently rose to 400. Also on 6 July a 74-year-old passenger died of a heart attack on board the ship. According to reports from the local health officials he had serious underlying health problems, and it was not known if a norovirus infection contributed to his death. On 7 July Transocean Tours decided to cancel the remainder of Marco Polo's ten-day cruise after consulting NHS Highland. Reportedly the company gave the passengers an option to either stay with the ship until she returned to Tilbury on 11 July or to return to their homes earlier by a specially arranged charter train. On 8 July three infected people remained in Raigmore Hospital in Inverness.

Some reports indicate that passengers on board Marco Polo's previous cruise, which terminated in Tilbury on 4 July, might also have been infected with norovirus. However, according to Transocean Tours the ship was inspected upon return to Tilbury and no infections were found, although some passengers during the cruise did suffer from gastroenteritis. The London Port Health Authority stated that they were not informed of illness on board the ship when it docked at Tilbury, and Transocean Tours could consequently face legal action.

Despite Transocean Tours' intention of keeping the ship in its fleet until 2012, reports emerged in August 2009 that Marco Polo would be chartered to the newly founded, UK-based Cruise & Maritime Voyages for five years from 2 January 2010. Her planned itineraries included cruises from the UK to South America during the northern hemisphere winter months, and from the UK to Northern Europe and the Mediterranean during the summer months.

On 13 March 2013 Cruise & Maritime voyages announced that Marco Polo would be terminating one of her northern lights cruises and go into dry dock for inspection and minor repairs after striking an uncharted object under command of the local pilot minutes after sailing from Sortland on 9 March 2013. Her cruise terminated in Antwerp with passengers being transferred to Tilbury and London via the Channel Tunnel or ferry by coach.

On 14 February 2014 a passenger died and sixteen people were injured after a freak wave struck the ship in the English Channel during a storm. One seriously injured passenger was taken off by helicopter. The ship was heading to Tilbury with 735 passengers and 349 crew on board.

Marco Polo has been the subject of a television programme in the series Mighty Cruise Ships (a spin-off of Mighty Ships) which documented the 2013 voyage to St Petersburg, Russia, and the Baltic States. The ship ran into a force 10 gale in The Baltic.

On 1 November 2014, while docking at the port of Leknes in Lofoten, Norway, a strong breeze sent the cruise ship off course, resulting in the ship running aground at coordinates 68.12208°N 13.56687°E.

=== Scrapping ===
On 20 July 2020, Cruise & Maritime Voyages entered administration. The company's administrators sold Marco Polo at auction for US$2.8 million on 22 October 2020. Plans for Offshore Solutions Unlimited to return her to service were not realised, nor were announced plans by the buyer, Highseas Ltd., to convert her into a floating hotel in Dubai. She was resold two months later for approximately $4 million to an Indian company, reached the scrapyards of Alang, India on 13 January 2021 and was beached and scrapped. Scrapping commenced on 28 March 2021.
