= MS Holiday =

Cruise ship built in 1985

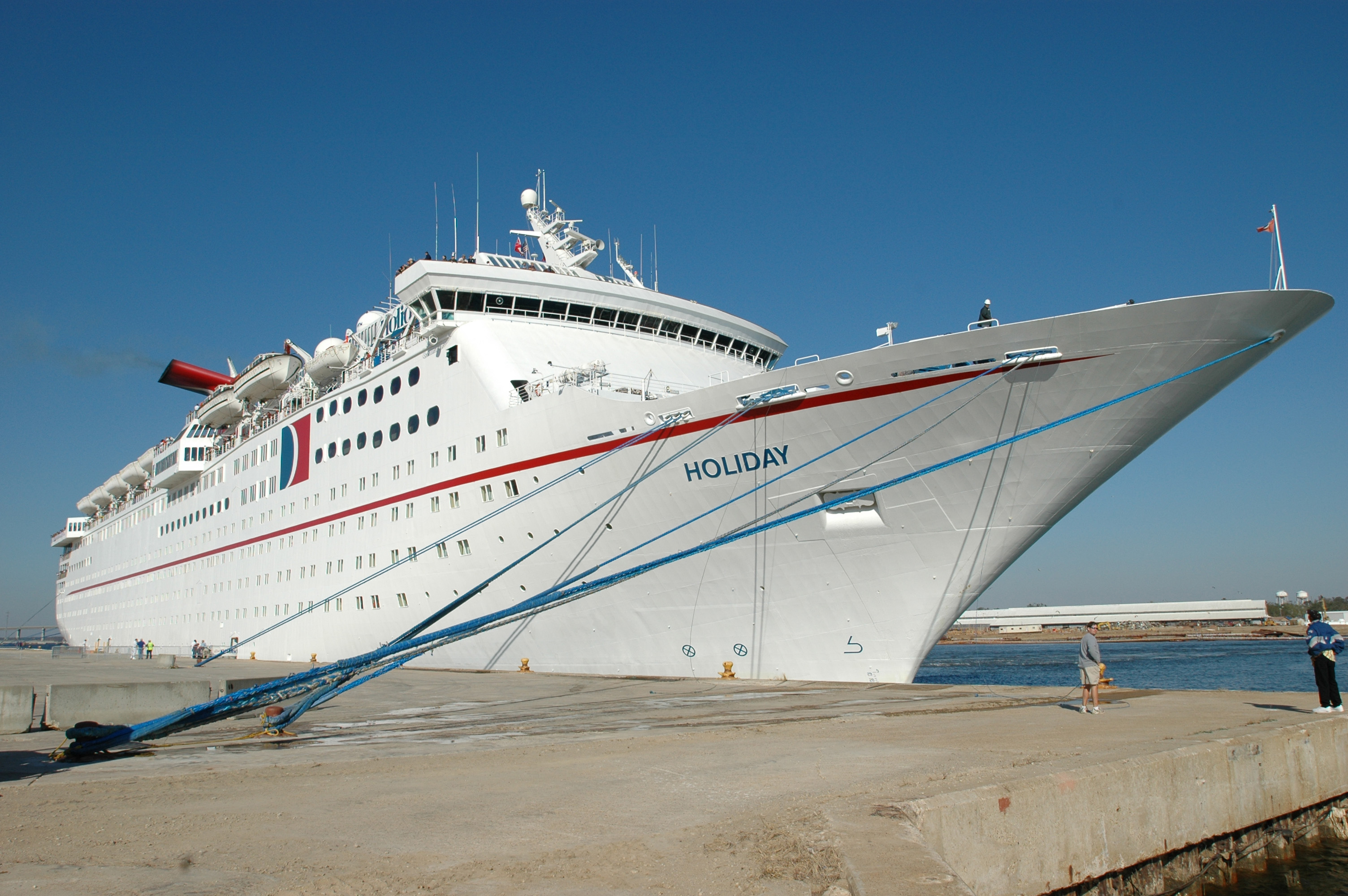
- Holiday in Mississippi on October 29, 2005

History
- Name: 1985–2009: Holiday; 2010–2014: Grand Holiday; 2015-2021: Magellan; 2021: Mages
- Owner: 1985–2015: Carnival Corporation & plc; 2015-2020: Global Maritime Group; 2020-2021: Seajets; 2021: Wanda Service Ltd
- Operator: 1985–2009: Carnival Cruise Lines; 2010–2014: Iberocruceros; 2014: Laid up; 2015–2020: Cruise & Maritime Voyages; 2020-2021: Seajets
- Port of registry: 1985–2009: Nassau, Bahamas; 2009–2015: Madeira, Portugal; 2015–2021: Nassau, Bahamas; 2021: Moroni, Comoros
- Builder: Aalborg Værft, Ålborg, Denmark
- Launched: 10 December 1983
- Completed: 21 June 1985
- Maiden voyage: 13 July 1985
- In service: 1985–2020
- Out of service: Spring 2020
- Identification: Call sign CQNH; IMO 8217881; MMSI 255803790
- Fate: Scrapped at Alang, India in 2021

General characteristics
- Class & type: Holiday-class cruise ship
- Tonnage: 46,052 GT
- Length: 728 ft (222 m)
- Beam: 105.6 ft (32.2 m)
- Decks: 10
- Speed: 21 knots (39 km/h; 24 mph)
- Capacity: 1,452 passengers
- Crew: 660

MS Holiday (also known as Grand Holiday and Magellan) was a Holiday-class cruise ship, which was formerly owned by Carnival Cruise Line as the Holiday and Ibero Cruises as the Grand Holiday. She last sailed for Cruise & Maritime Voyages from Spring 2015 to 2020 as the Magellan until Cruise & Maritime Voyages ceased operations due to the COVID-19 pandemic. She was then sold at auction and was scrapped at Alang, India in early 2021.

== Ship history ==
=== Service as Holiday and Grand Holiday ===
MS Holiday was built by Aalborg Værft in Aalborg, Denmark and entered service for Carnival Cruise Lines on 13 July 1985. The ship was the first out of the three Holiday-class ships built for the line. The ship's condition had been in decline, until 2003 when she was sent into dry dock and renovated. In 2005, during Hurricane Katrina, she was taken out of service to be used as temporary housing for the victims of the storm. After leaving Mississippi, she again went to dry dock for an additional three weeks of renovations. New carpeting and plumbing were added and repairs to the propellers were made, amongst other improvements.

Holiday resumed her normal route in the Western Caribbean, sailing from Mobile, Alabama until November 2009 when Holiday was retired from the Carnival fleet. She was later transferred to the fleet of Iberocruceros, another cruise line owned by Carnival Corporation & plc as MS Grand Holiday. The distinctive Carnival-style funnel was kept and repainted. In April 2010, she underwent dry dock refurbishment and was then transferred to the Ibero Cruises fleet. Sailing as Grand Holiday began on 18 May 2010

The ship was transformed into a four-star floating hotel in Port Sochi Imeretinskiy during the Winter Olympics from 5 to 24 February 2014.

However, in the same year Ibero Cruises was absorbed into Costa Cruises. Costa had little interest in keeping the Grand Holiday in service, and she was laid up before being sold off.

=== Service as Magellan ===
On 3 November 2014, British cruise line Cruise & Maritime Voyages announced that Grand Holiday would be joining their fleet in Spring 2015 under the name Magellan. She began cruising out of London Tilbury, Newcastle upon Tyne and Dundee commencing 15 March 2015 and also Hamburg on 12 July 2015. In 2018 she underwent dry dock with Damen Shiprepair in Amsterdam. In 2019, she began cruising out of Liverpool Cruise Terminal.

=== Disposal as Mages ===
On 20 July 2020 South Quay Travel Limited, which traded under the name 'Cruise & Maritime Voyages', was placed into administration. On 19 October 2020, CW Kellock & Co. London auctioned Magellan. The Greek company Seajets won the auction, with the declared intention of converting her into a floating hotel at Liverpool for the 2021 Grand National. However, citing high operating costs, they instead resold her for scrap. She was renamed Mages and sailed to Alang, India, for scrapping with anchorage at Bhavnagar on 23 January 2021; the ship was moved in front of Alang on 28 January waiting for high tide and was finally beached in the early morning of 30 January 2021. Scrapping started on 21 June 2021.

== Gallery ==
Pictures of the ship in previous liveries

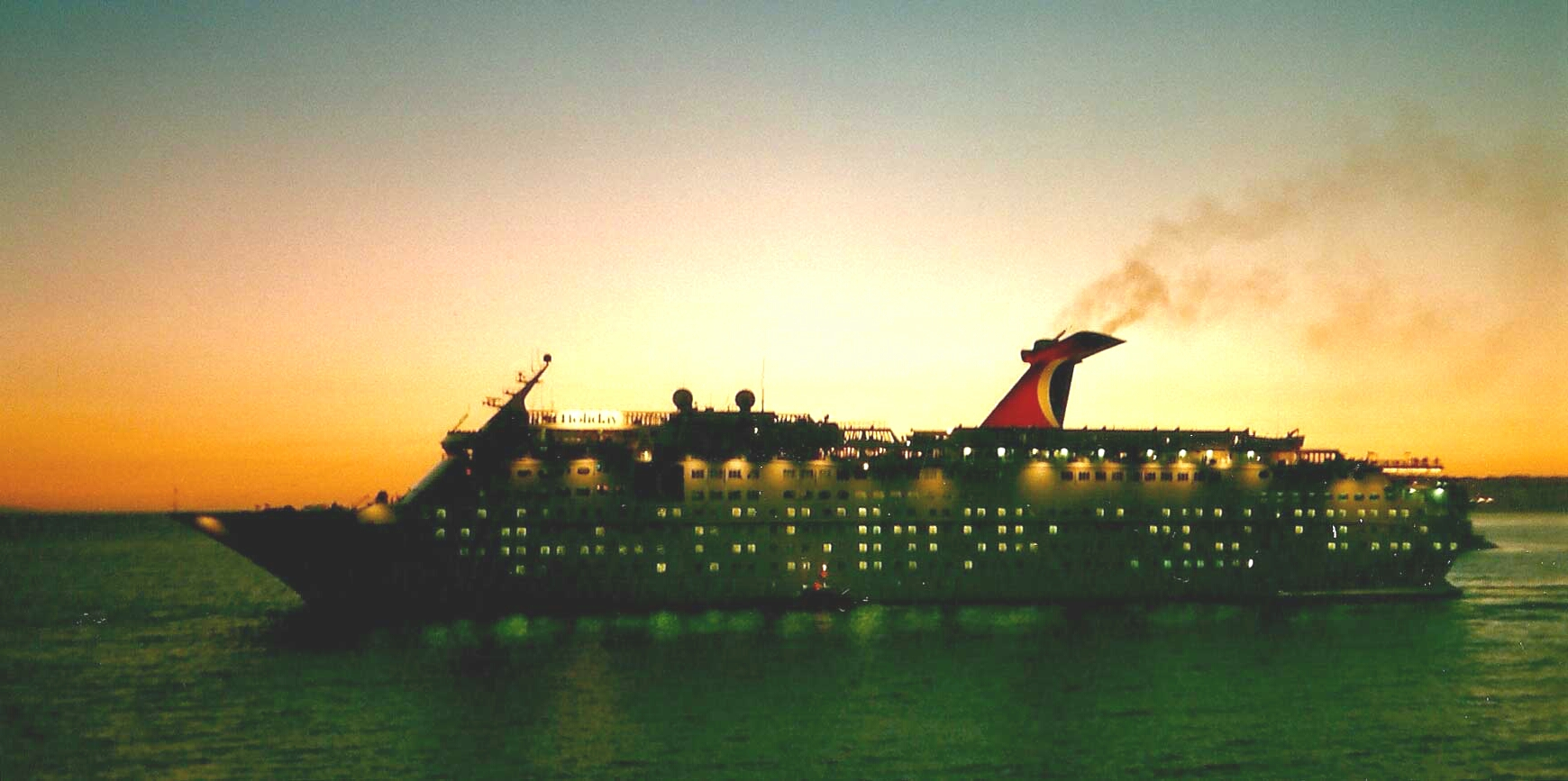
Holiday

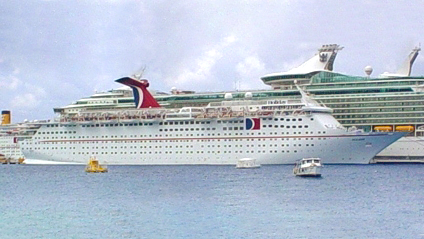
Holiday docked in Cozumel, March 2004

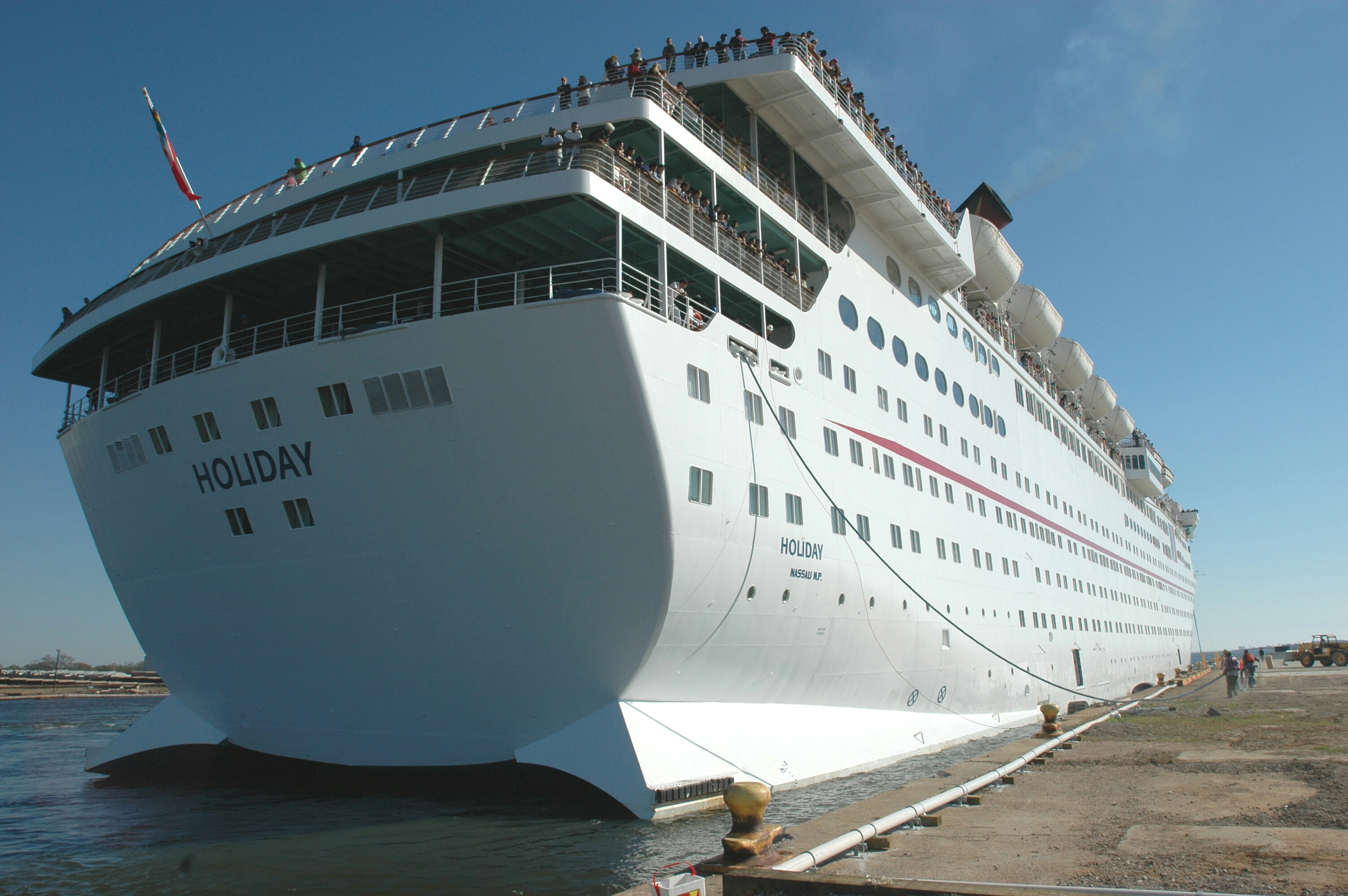
Holiday in Mississippi, October 29, 2010

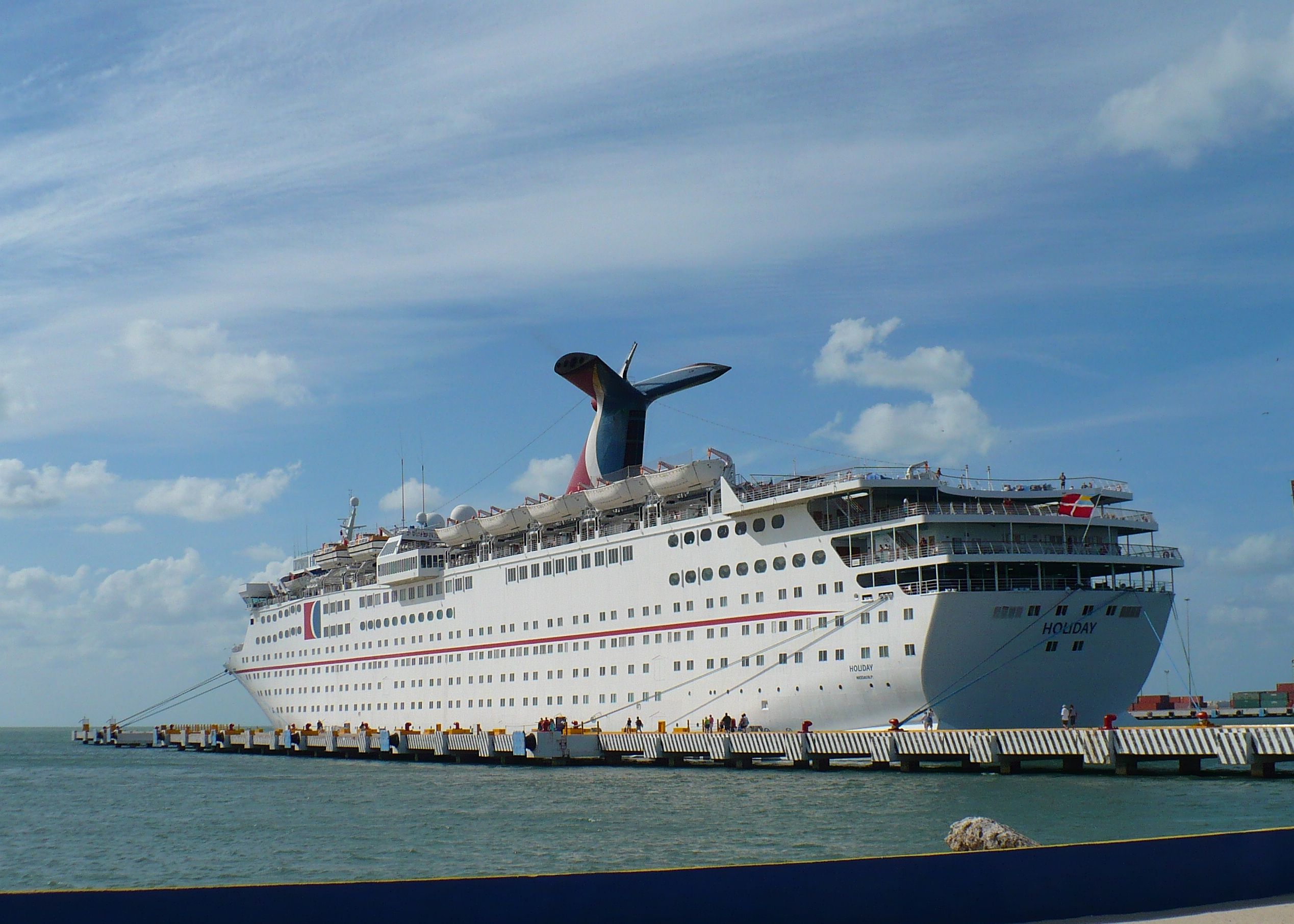
Holiday at the port of Yucatán, Mexico

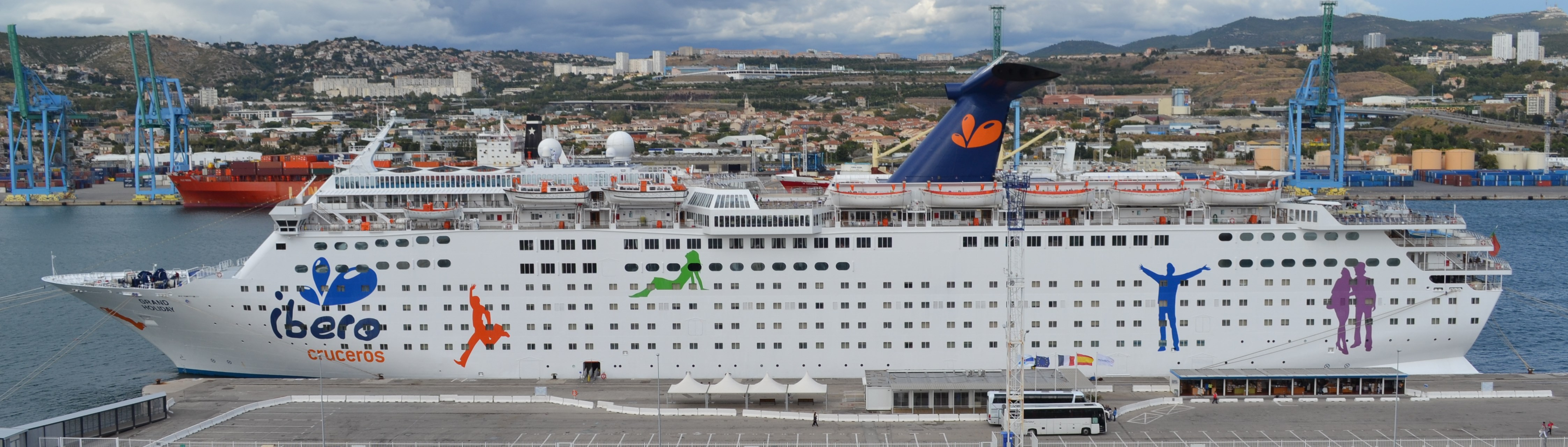
Grand Holiday docked in Marseille

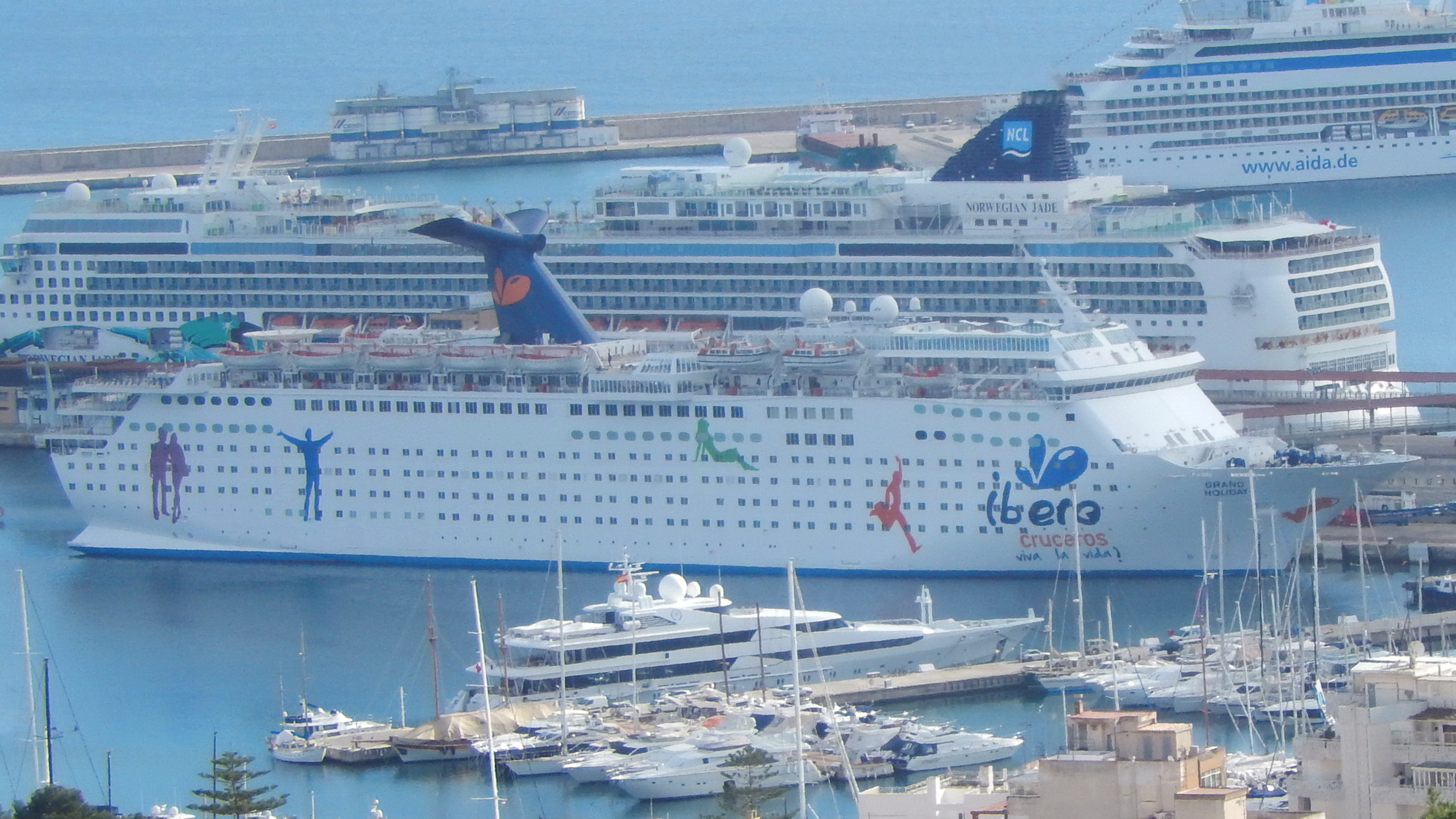
Grand Holiday docked in Palma, Majorca, Spain. NCL's cruise ship Norwegian Jade can be seen in the background.

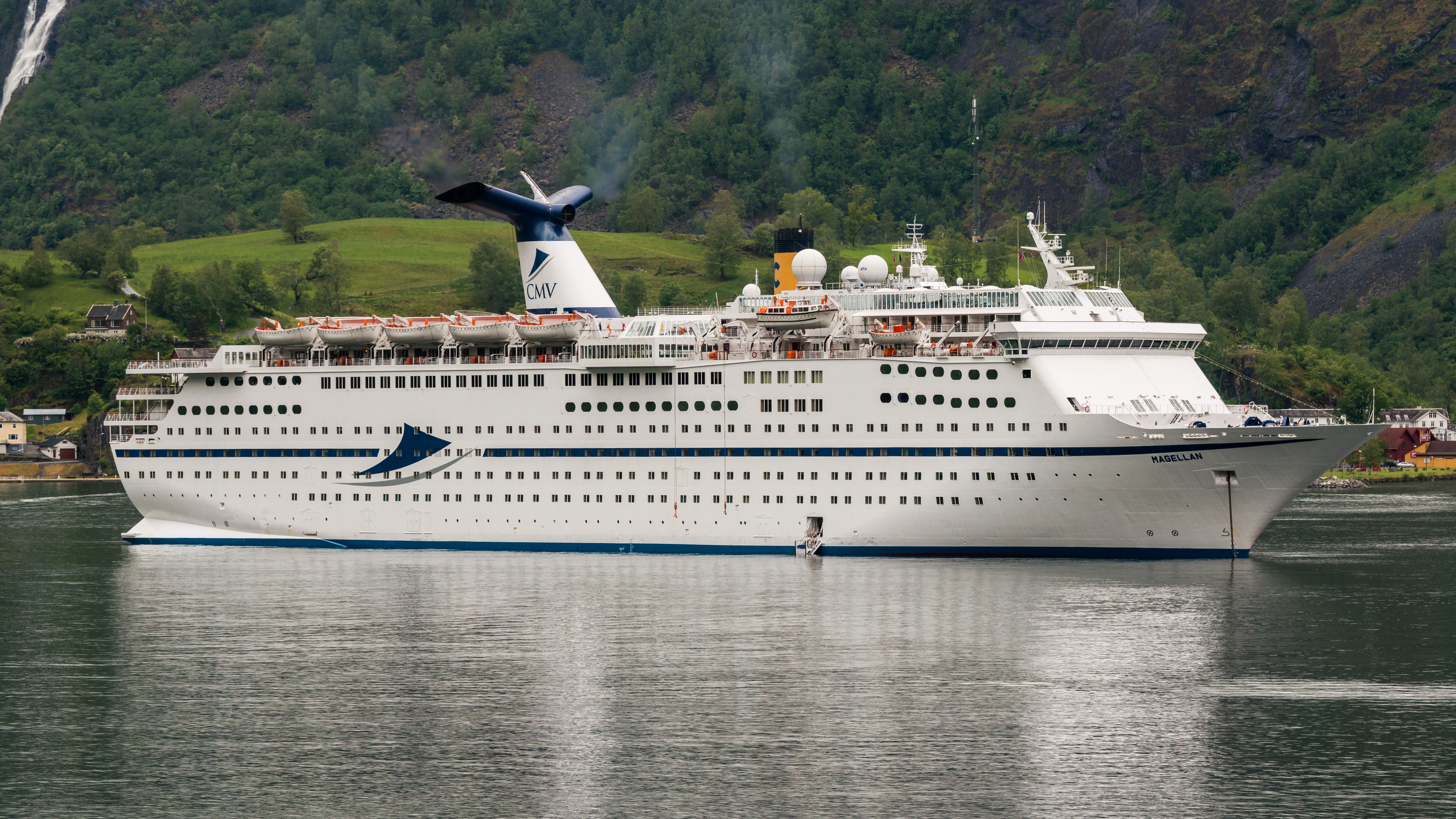
Magellan anchored in Flåm

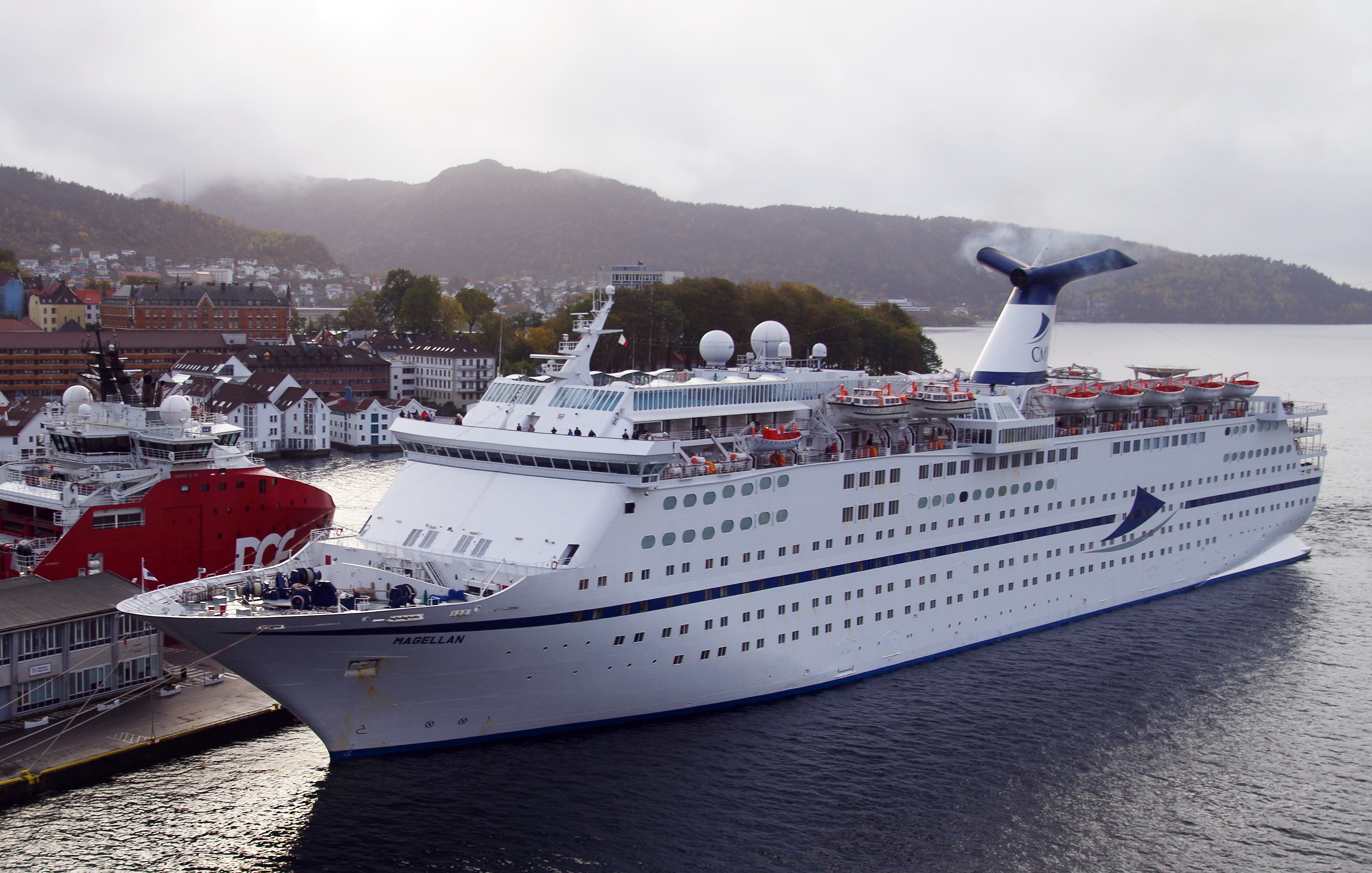
Magellan

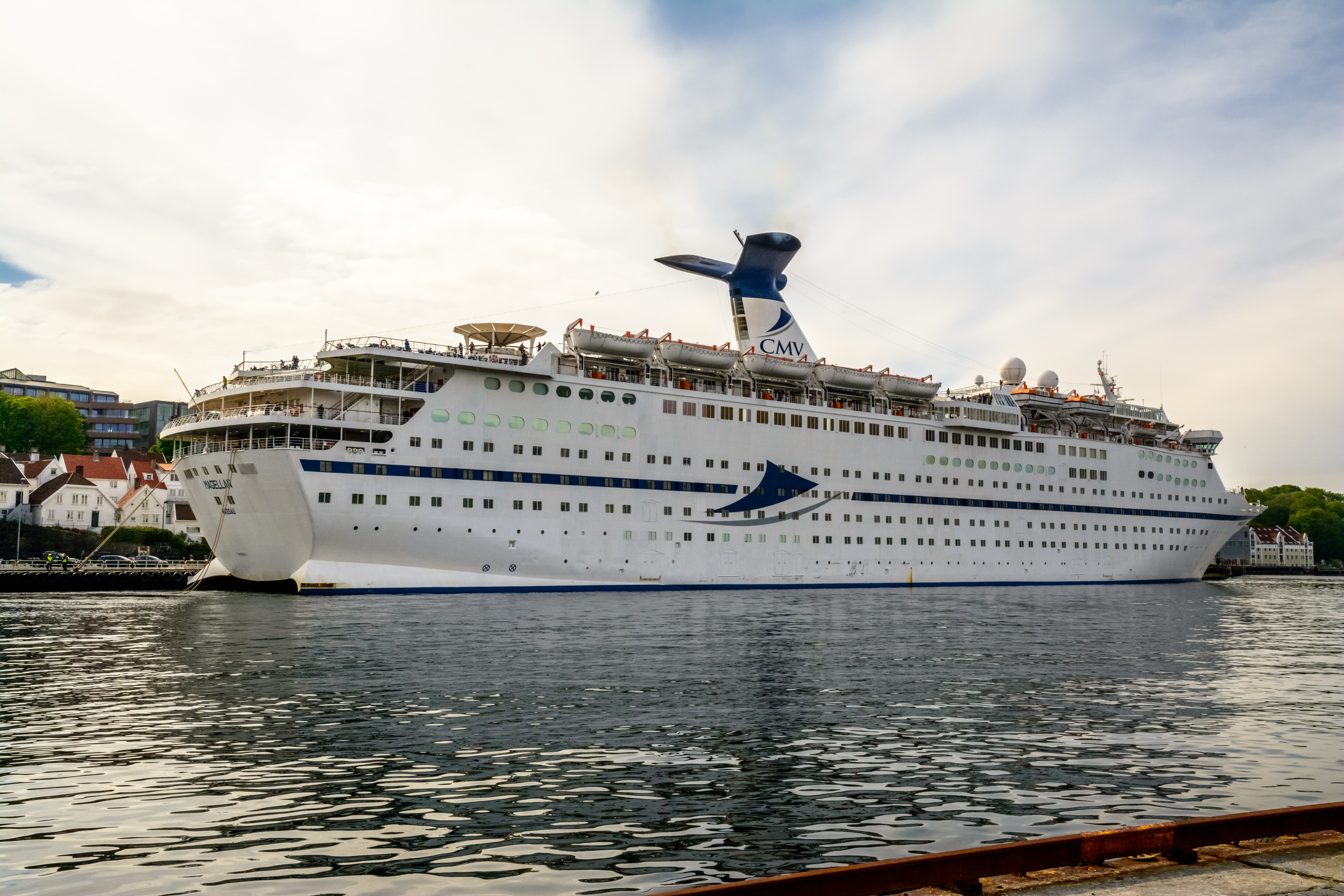
Magellan in Stavanger, Norway on May 22 .2017
