= Vistafjord =

Ocean liner (1973–2017)

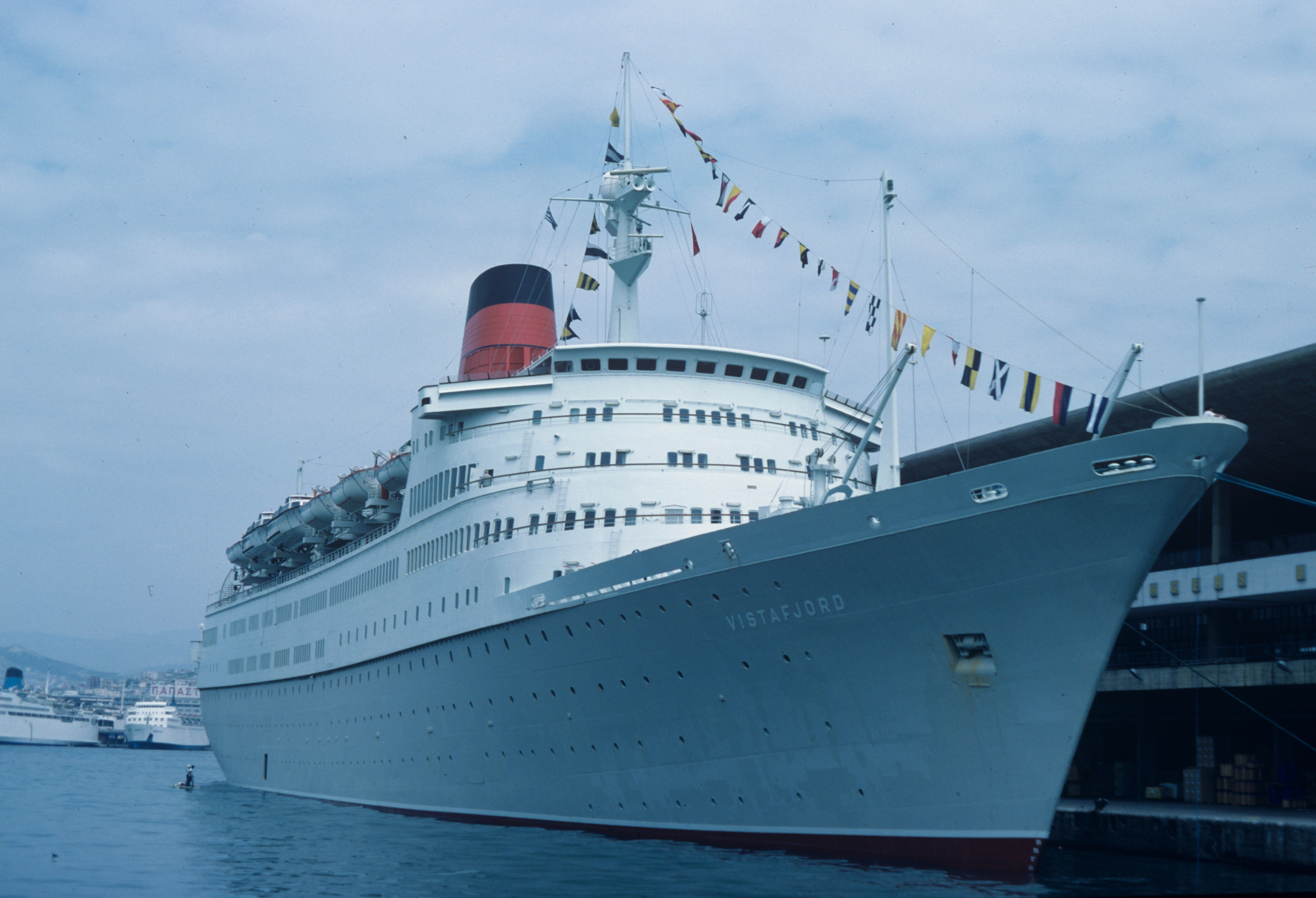
- Vistafjord in Piraeus, 1984

History
- Name: 1973–1999: Vistafjord; 1999–2004: Caronia; 2004–2014: Saga Ruby; 2014–2017: Oasia
- Owner: 1973–1983: Norwegian America Line; 1983–1998: Cunard; 1998–2004: Carnival Corporation; 2004–2014: Acromas Shipping; 2014–2017: Millenium View Ltd, Singapore
- Operator: 1973–1983: Norwegian America Line; 1983–2004: Cunard; 2004–2014: Saga Cruises
- Port of registry: 1973–1983: Oslo, Norway; 1983–1999: Nassau, Bahamas; 1999–2004: Southampton, United Kingdom; 2004–2010: London, United Kingdom; 2010–2014: Valletta, Malta; 2014–2017: Nassau, Bahamas
- Builder: Swan Hunter, Newcastle, England
- Cost: $35 million
- Yard number: 39
- Launched: 15 May 1972
- Completed: 1972
- Acquired: 15 May 1973
- Maiden voyage: 22 May 1972
- In service: 1972–2017
- Out of service: 2017
- Identification: IMO number: 7214715; as Saga Ruby: Call sign: 9HA2415; MMSI number: 248563000
- Fate: Scrapped in 2017
- Notes: Beached for scrap

General characteristics (as built)
- Type: Cruise ship
- Tonnage: 24,292 GRT; 5,954 DWT
- Length: 191.09 m (626 ft 11 in)
- Beam: 25.00 m (82 ft 0 in)
- Draught: 8.20 m (26 ft 11 in)
- Ice class: 1 C
- Installed power: 2 × Sulzer 9RD68; 17,650 kW (combined)
- Propulsion: 2 propellers
- Speed: 20 knots (37 km/h; 23 mph) (service)
- Capacity: 670 passengers (maximum)

General characteristics (after 2005 refit)
- Tonnage: 24,492 GT
- Draught: 8.23 m (27 ft 0 in)
- Decks: 9 (passenger accessible)
- Capacity: 655 passengers (maximum)
- Crew: 380
- Notes: Otherwise the same as built

Vistafjord was an ocean liner that was built as a combined liner/cruise ship in 1973 by Swan Hunter, England for the Norwegian America Line. In 1983 she was sold to Cunard, retaining her original name until 1999 when she was renamed Caronia. In 2004 she was sold to Saga and sailed as Saga Ruby until sold in 2014 for use as a floating hotel and renamed Oasia. This never came to fruition. Her owners went bankrupt, and in April 2017 she arrived at Alang Ship Breaking Yard, India for scrapping.

== Concept and construction ==
Vistafjord was ordered by Norwegian America Line (NAL) from Swan Hunter, Newcastle, England. She was based on the company's 1965-built MS Sagafjord, but with an enlarged hull, additional superstructure deck and improved interior layout. However, as the cost of building Sagafjord had put her builders, Forges et Chantiers de la Mediterranee, out of business, Vistafjord had to be built at a different shipyard. She was launched on 15 May 1972 and delivered to the Norwegian America Line exactly a year later on 15 May 1973. She was the last cruise ship to have been built in the United Kingdom.

== Service history ==
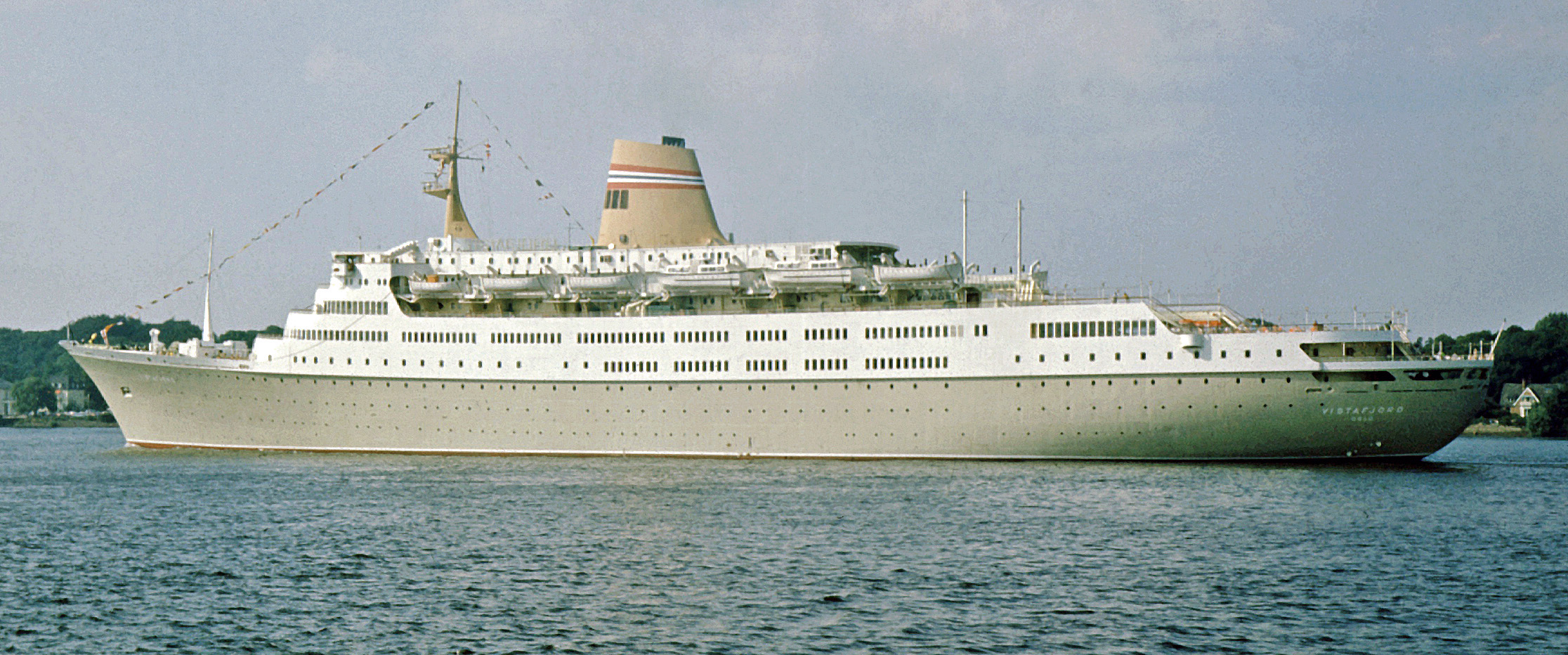
Vistafjord in Hamburg 1973

=== Norwegian America Line ===
On 22 May 1973, Vistafjord set on her maiden voyage, a transatlantic crossing from Oslo to New York. In early 1980, the vessel was famously chartered by car manufacturer British Leyland to internally launch the Austin Metro to its British dealer network.

Although their ships were high-rated, Norwegian America Line had trouble making profit.

=== Cunard Line ===
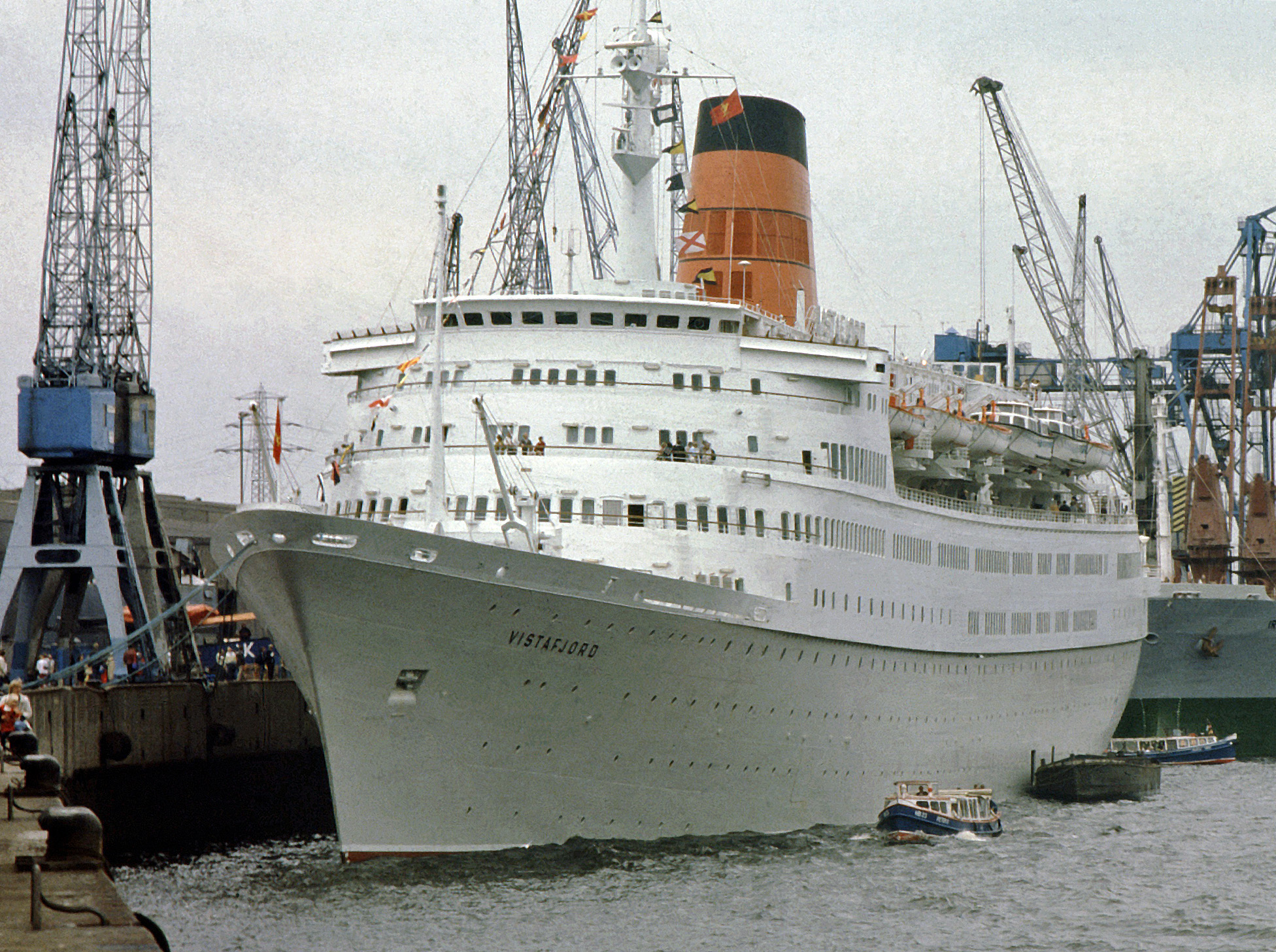
Vistafjord 1984

In 1983 Trafalgar House, the owners of Cunard, purchased NAL and in October 1983 Vistafjord joined the Cunard fleet together with her fleetmate Sagafjord. She retained her original name and the grey NAL hull colour, but received Cunard Line funnel colours and was re-registered to the Bahamas. Despite the flag change she retained Norwegian command staff.

During this time, both Vistafjord and Sagafjord, were considered to be amongst the most luxurious cruise ships in the world, sharing the top 5 in Berlitz Complete Guide to Cruising, together Sagafjord and Royal Viking Line's Royal Viking Star, Royal Viking Sky and Royal Viking Sea for several years.

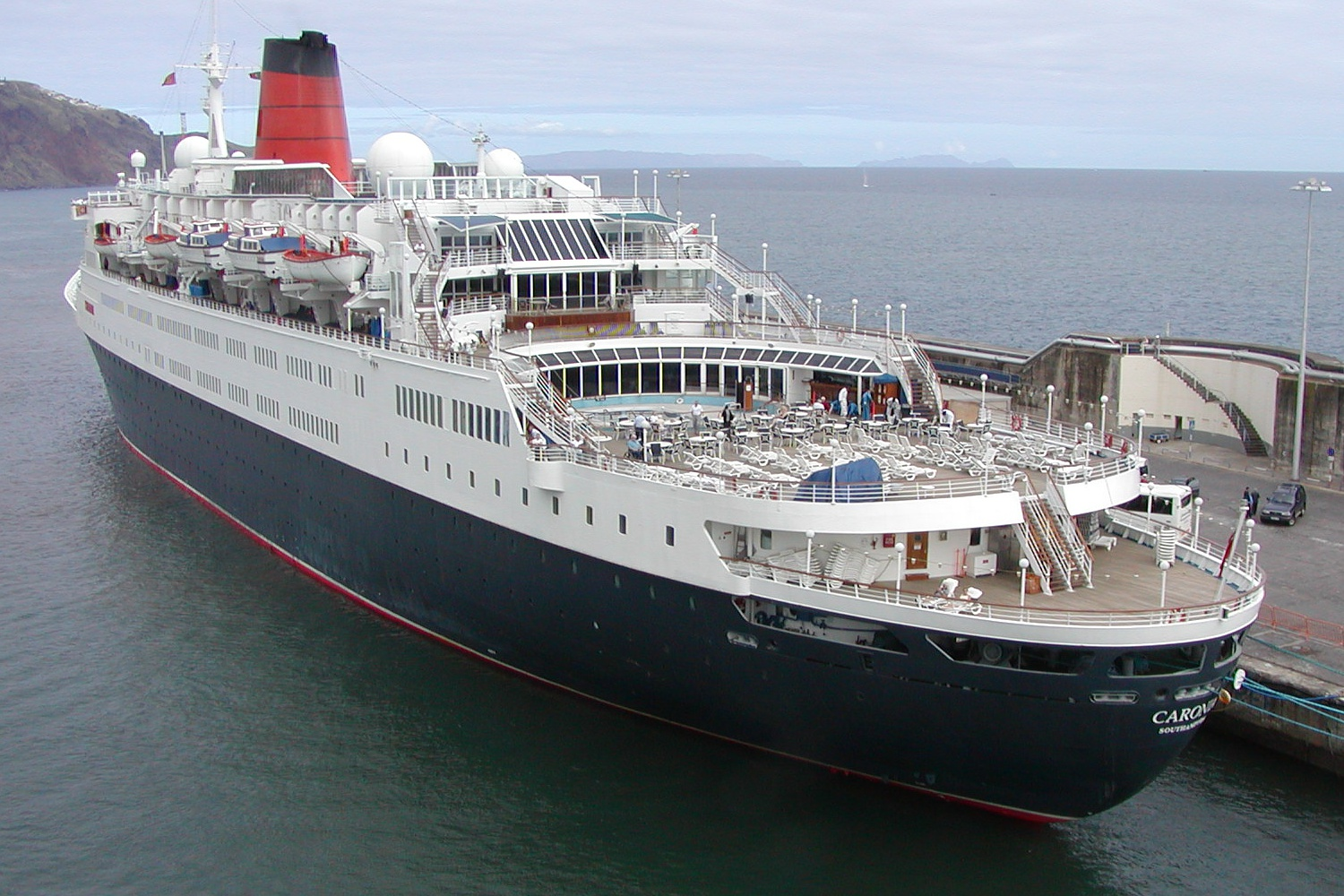
Caronia in 2003.

In 1999 the decision was made to rename Vistafjord with a more traditional Cunard Line name. On 10 December 1999 she was renamed Caronia and re-registered in the United Kingdom.

=== Saga Cruises ===
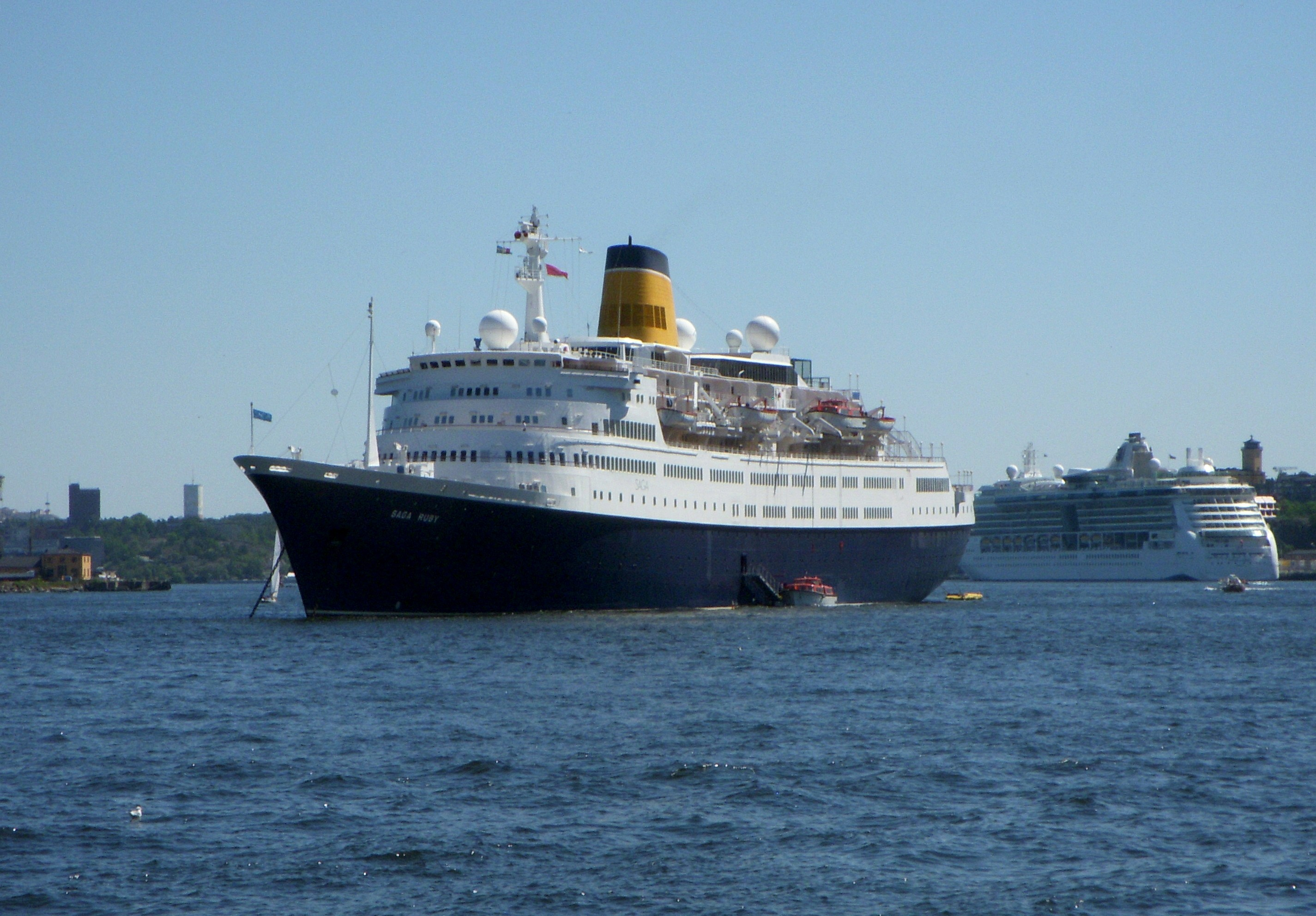
Saga Ruby in Stockholm 2011

She continued service with Cunard until November 2004, when she was sold to Saga Cruises. Following a £17 million refit at Valletta, Malta Caronia reappeared as Saga Ruby in March 2005. In the Saga Cruises fleet she joined her former Norwegian America Line fleetmate Sagafjord (now named Saga Rose).

It was reported in 2012 that Saga Cruises would retire Saga Ruby in 2014 and the Quest for Adventure would move back into the fleet as Saga Pearl II.

==== Farewell voyage with Saga ====
She sailed her final world cruise in the first months of 2013. However it was marred by technical difficulties which kept the ship in Southampton until late February, which led to the cruise being renamed the 'Grand Voyage' visiting South America and South Africa.

It was reported that Saga Ruby would depart on her final cruise with Saga Cruises on 7 December 2013 round trip from Southampton on a 31-day voyage to the Caribbean. While on her final cruise she was forced to change her itinerary to a Western Mediterranean cruise finally returning to Southampton on January 7, 2014. The cruise returned to Southampton late due to poor weather in the Bay of Biscay, eventually arriving on 9 January 2014, with passengers disembarking on 10 January.

=== Floating hotel Oasia ===
In January 2014 she was sold for US$14 million to Millennium View, a privately held company based in Singapore. The new owners planned to convert her into a floating hotel in Myanmar. In mid-February 2014 she sailed from Gibraltar as Oasia under Bahamas flag and management of FleetPro Ocean. In February 2017, it was announced that Oasia was being sold for scrap. The ship, was still SOLAS compliant and had recently undergone a US$10 million overhaul as a hotel and museum ship. She was found in Thailand, awaiting tow to scrapping, after having US$20 million invested in her.

== Design ==
=== Exterior design ===
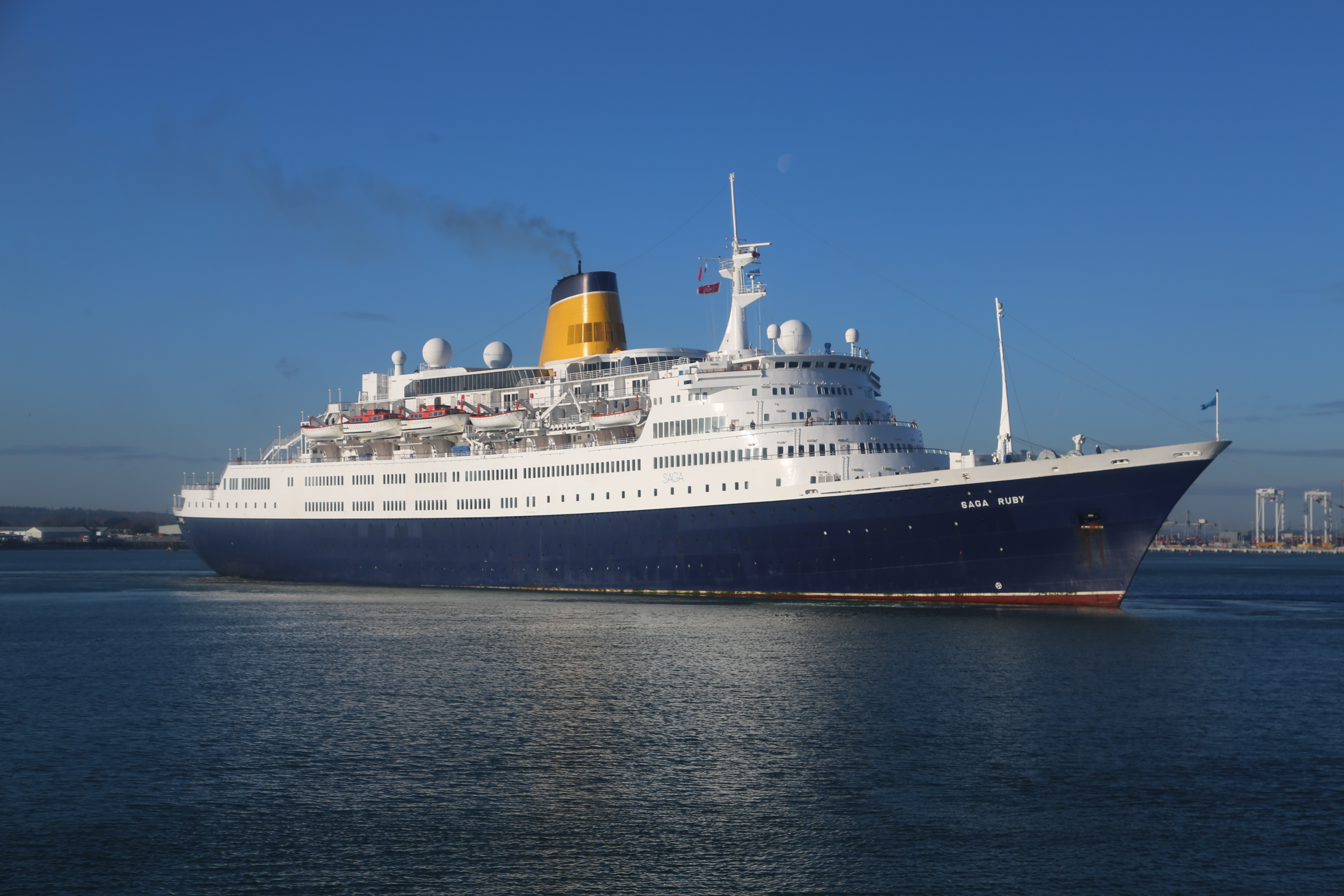
Saga Ruby in 2013

Vistafjord was built with a very traditional ocean liner profile, with the funnel placed amidship and a notable sheer on her hull. The superstructure is terraced both at the fore and aft of the ship. In two refits during her Cunard Line career additional structures were added to the rear and top of the superstructure.

In Norwegian America Line service Vistafjord carried the traditional NAL livery, with a grey hull, white superstructure, yellow mast and a yellow funnel with red, white and blue (colours of the flag of Norway) stripes. Following the sale to Cunard she retained the grey hull colour, but her funnel was painted in the red/black Cunard colours and her mast white. A red "Cunard" text was later added to her superstructure. Coinciding with her renaming into Caronia in 1999 the ship's hull was repainted black. As Saga Ruby her hull was repainted dark blue and her funnel yellow, with a dark blue top and a narrow white stripe separating the two colours.

== Filming ==
- Vistafjord featured in the 1983 movie Table for Five.
- Vistafjord featured in two 1985 consecutive episodes of The Love Boat, season 9, episodes 4 and 5 ("The Spain Cruise").
- Vistafjord featured in the 1986 episode "Countdown" of MacGyver as the cruise ship SS Victoria.
