= Spirit of Adventure =

Spirit of Adventure may refer to:

- Spirit of Adventure (video game), a 1991 Attic Entertainment computer role-playing game
- The Spirit of Adventure, a 1915 American short film
- MS Berlin (1981), a cruise ship that operated for Saga Cruises as Spirit of Adventure from 2006 to 2012; later operated for FTI Cruises from 2012 to 2020 as FTI Berlin and Berlin
- Spirit of Adventure (2020 ship), a cruise ship set to operate for Saga Cruises in 2020
- Spirit of Adventure, an airship in Up (2009 film)
  - "The Spirit of Adventure", a song by Michael Giacchino featuring Craig Copeland from Up (film score)
- Spirit of Adventure Council
