= Saga Pearl II =

German cruise ship

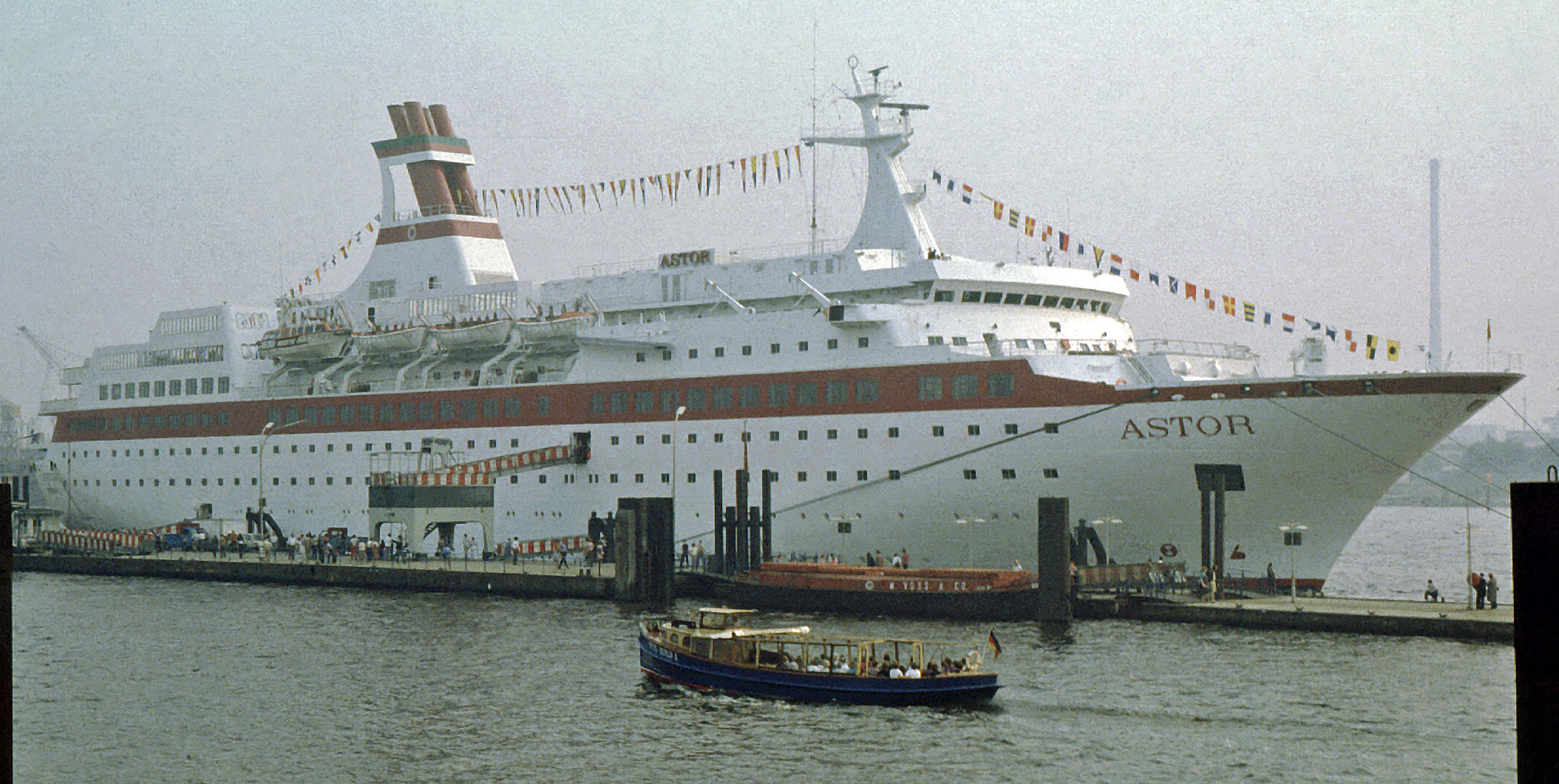
- Saga Pearl II as Astor in Hamburg, 1983

History
- Name: 1981–1985: Astor; 1985–2002: Arkona; 2002–2010: Astoria; 2010–2012: Saga Pearl II; 2012–2013: Quest for Adventure; 2013–2019: Saga Pearl II; 2019–2022: Pearl II; 2022: Pearl
- Operator: 1981–1984: HADAG; 1984–1985: Safmarine; 1985–2001:Deutsche Seereederei; 2001–2009: Transocean Tours; 2009-2019: Saga Cruises; 2019–2022: Aqua Explorer Holdings Ltd.
- Port of registry: 1981–1985 Hamburg, Germany; 1985–1990: Rostock,, German Democratic Republic; 1990–1997: Rostock, Germany; 1997–2002: Monrovia, Liberia; 2002–2011: Nassau, Bahamas; 2011–2022: Valletta, Malta
- Builder: Howaldtswerke-Deutsche Werft, Werk Ross, Hamburg
- Yard number: 165
- Laid down: 20 May 1980
- Launched: 16 December 1980
- Completed: December 1981
- In service: 14 December 1981
- Out of service: 2019
- Identification: Call sign: 9HA2950; IMO number: 8000214; MMSI number: 256878000; DNV ID: G16718
- Fate: Scrapped in Aliağa, Turkey in 2022

General characteristics
- Class & type: Cruise ship
- Tonnage: 18,591 GT → 18,627 GT
- Length: 164.35 m (539 ft 2 in)
- Beam: 22.6 m (74 ft 2 in)
- Draught: 6.2 m (20 ft 4 in)
- Installed power: 4 × MAN 6L40/45 (4 × 3,300 bhp)
- Propulsion: Two shafts; controllable pitch propellers
- Speed: 21.4 knots (39.6 km/h; 24.6 mph) (maximum); 20.3 knots (37.6 km/h; 23.4 mph) (cruising)
- Capacity: 638 passengers (originally); 530 passengers (1984); 449 passengers (2018)
- Crew: 252

MS Saga Pearl II was a cruise ship of about 18,700 GT that was built in Germany by Howaldtswerke-Deutsche Werft as the Astor in 1981. After short unsuccessful operations with two owners, she was bought by the East German government in 1985 and renamed Arkona. After 1990 the ship was operated by Seetours, which was acquired by P&O Princess Cruises in 1999, and then chartered to Transocean Tours as Astoria in 2002. From 2009 until 2019 she was owned by Saga Cruises as Saga Pearl II (and a short period as Quest for Adventure), then withdrawn from service, laid up as Pearl II, and scrapped in 2022.

== Design and construction ==
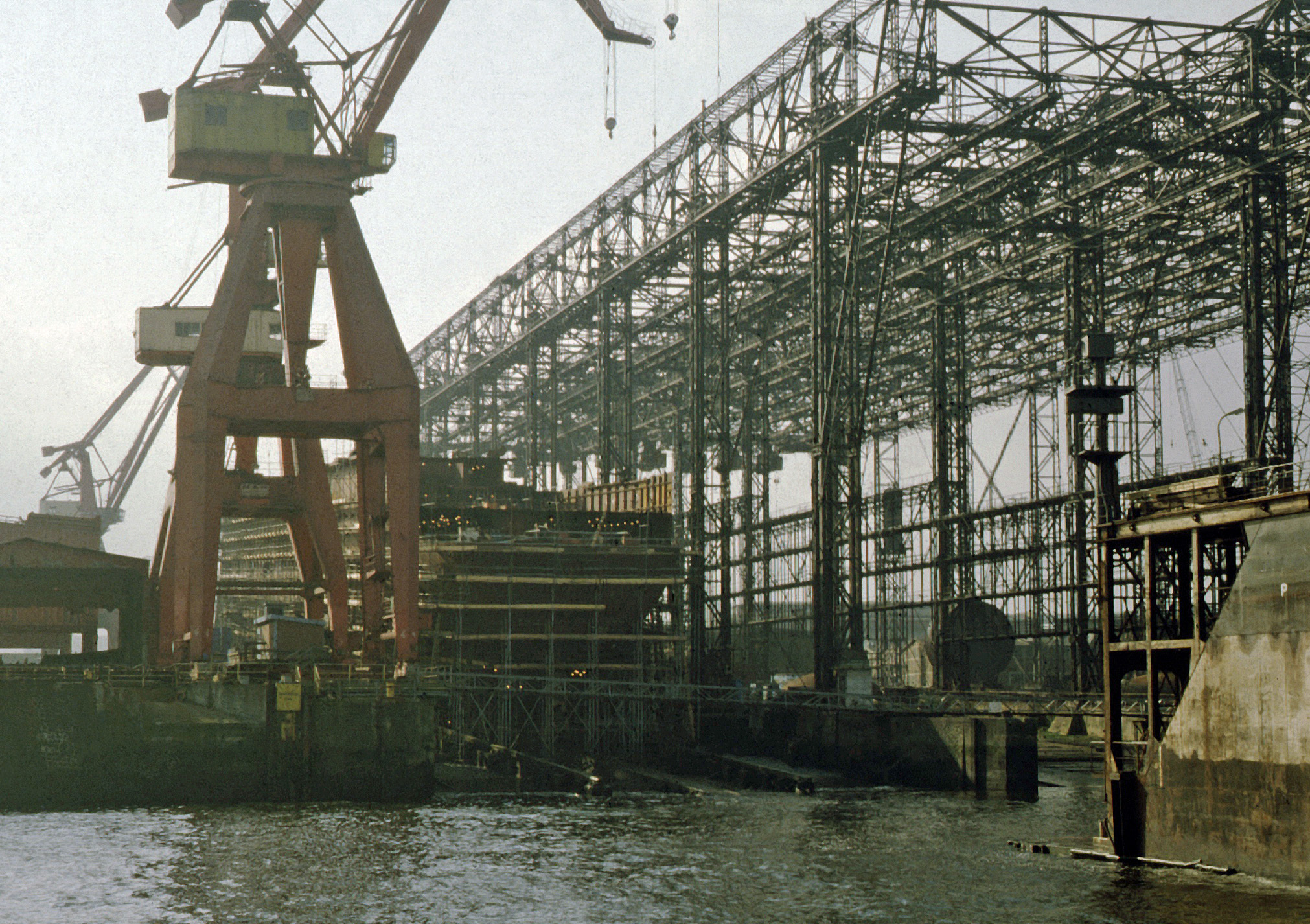
Astor under construction at Hamburg in 1980.

Astor was built in 1981 as Yard no. 165 in the shipyard of Howaldtswerke-Deutsche Werft, Werk Ross, Hamburg for the newly-formed German company Hadag Cruise Line, owned by the City of Hamburg. Originally intended to be named Hammonia, the female personification of Hamburg, she was launched as Astor on 16 December 1980. As built, she measured 18,834 gross tonnage (GT) and her hull dimensions were 164.35 m (539 ft 2 in) length overall, 22.6 m (74 ft 2 in) beam and 16.1 m (52 ft 10 in) depth, with a service draught of 6.1 m (20 ft 0 in). She was powered by four 6-cylinder MAN 6L40/45 medium-speed diesel engines rated 3,300 brake horsepower (2,500 kW) each. They were geared to two controllable-pitch propellers, which gave a speed of 18 knots (33 km/h; 21 mph). The ship's initial capacity was for 638 passengers.

During fitting out she was damaged by an onboard fire, leading to a delay in delivery of over three months.

== Service history ==
=== Astor ===
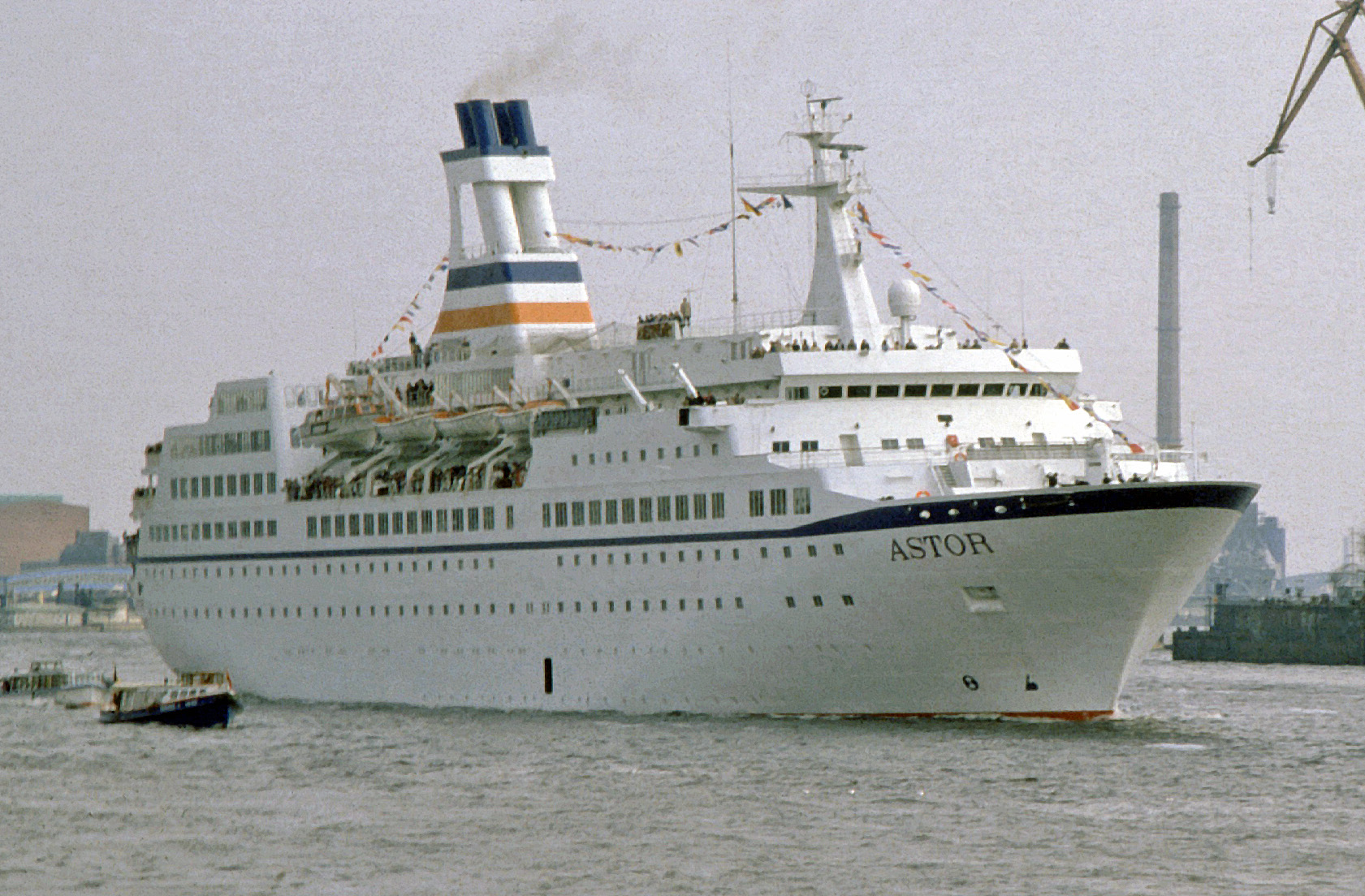
Astor at Hamburg in 1984.

Astor's maiden voyage had been scheduled for 22 August 1981 but could only begin after her delayed delivery on 4 December. Her schedule of winter cruises in the Caribbean region and summers in Europe did not prove to be profitable, so Hadag decided in October 1983 to sell her.

The South African Marine Corporation (Safmarine) bought the ship in February 1984 and, after a refit in Hamburg during which the passenger capacity was reduced to 530, they began a programme combining cruises in Europe and southern Africa with Southampton–Cape Town voyages, reviving the ocean liner route. However, Safmarine discovered that Astor did not have enough speed to maintain the liner schedule. So a new ship was ordered that could meet those requirements, also to be named Astor, and the existing ship was sold on 29 August 1985.

It has been alleged that the sale of Astor to East Germany, via a West German intermediary, was part of a secret three-way arrangement through which South Africa received submarine technology transfer, in defiance of the international arms embargo, as well as the replacement Astor. At the same time the HDW shipyard, desperate for new work, would build the ship, and East Germany, which lacked the foreign currency to buy Astor, could pay the intermediary in its national Ostmark.

=== Arkona ===
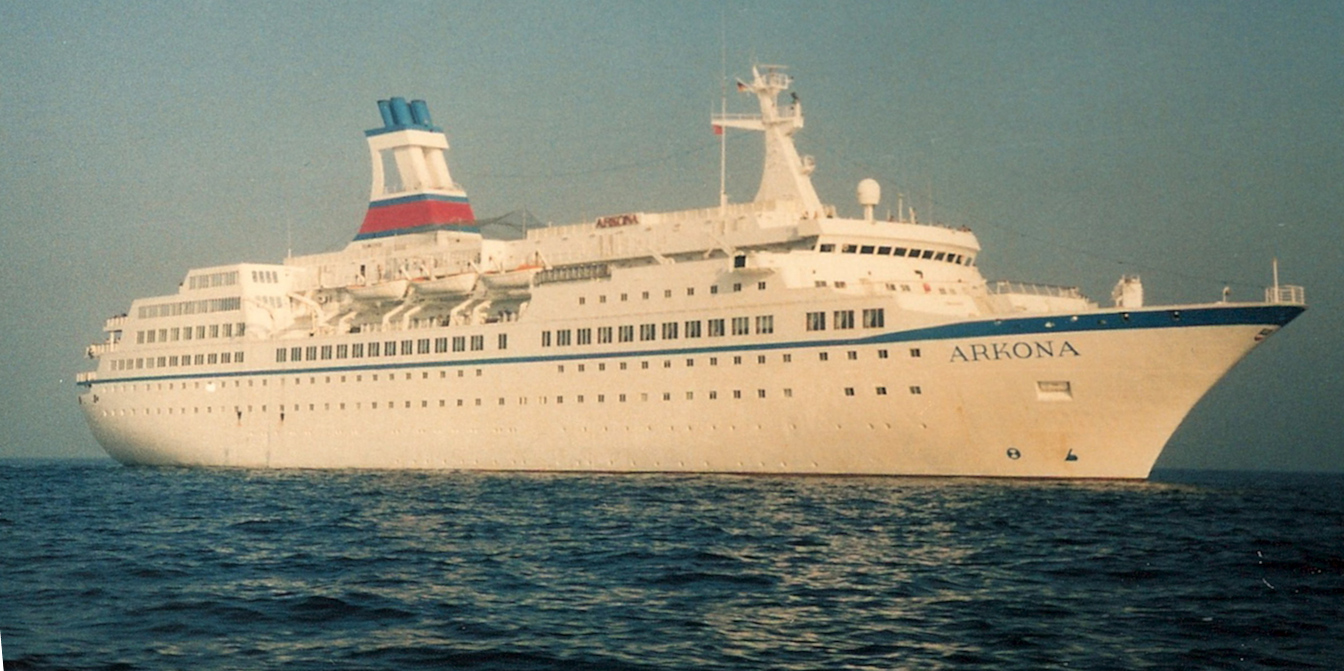
Arkona on a cruise in the Baltic Sea, 1989

On 29 August 1985, Astor was acquired by Deutfracht/Seereederei Rostock (DSR), the East German state shipping company, and was renamed the Arkona. The vessel was used to give favoured party officials cruises for part of the year, and was chartered to western operators for the remainder. During the process of the reunification of Germany, DSR was privatised in 1990. DSR acquired Seetours of Bremen and cruises on the Arkona were marketed under the Seetours franchise.

=== Astoria ===
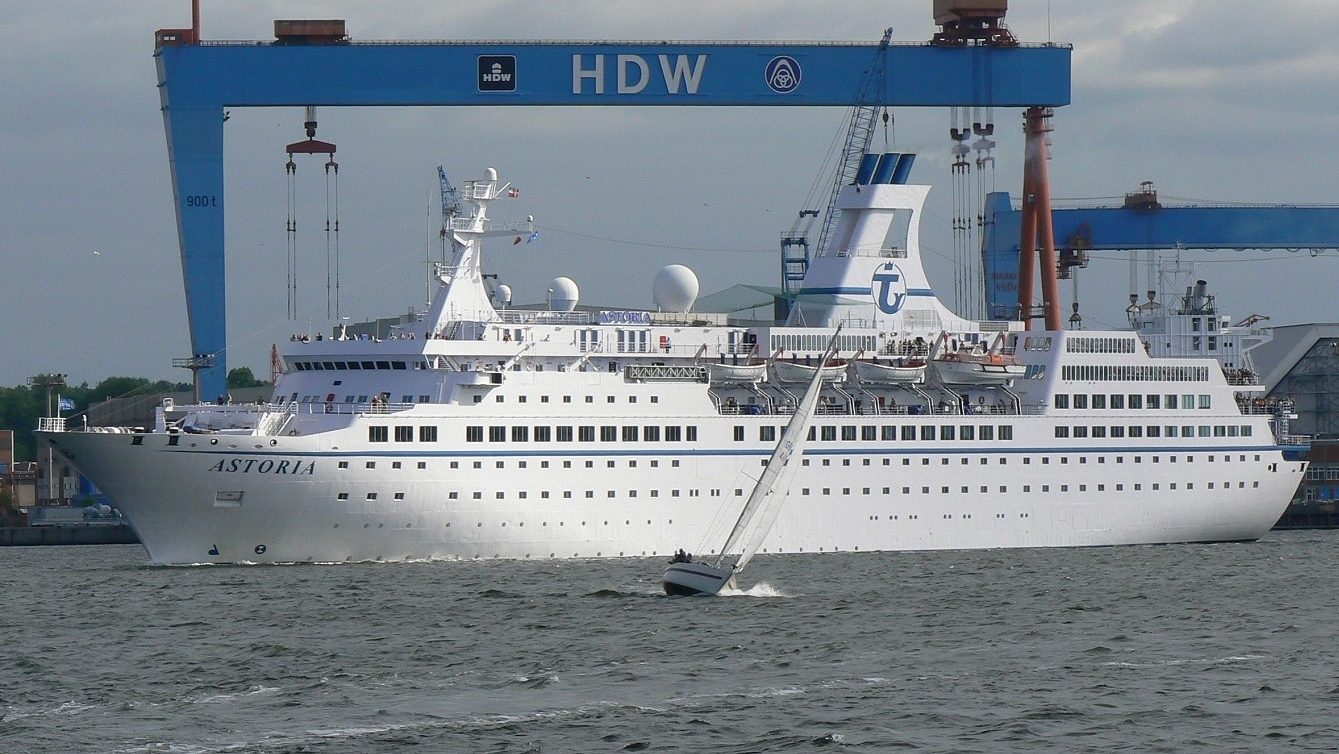
Astoria in Kiel

P&O Princess Cruises acquired Seetours in 1999 and retired Arkona in 2001 (Seetours was rebranded as AIDA Cruises in 2004). The Arkona was renamed Astoria in 2002 and bareboat chartered to Transocean Tours of Bremen. Under Transocean, Astoria specialized in cruises in Europe, particularly to Norway. The vessel then operated on coastal itineraries, providing low-cost cruises for German, Norwegian and Swedish passengers.

In November 2008, a world cruise had to be aborted after serious mechanical problems were identified during a refit in Barcelona. The ship remained laid up in Barcelona until June 2009 when she was towed to Gibraltar. Following an auction in August, Saga Cruises acquired the ship after an unsuccessful attempt to do so earlier in the year.

=== Saga Pearl II and Quest for Adventure ===
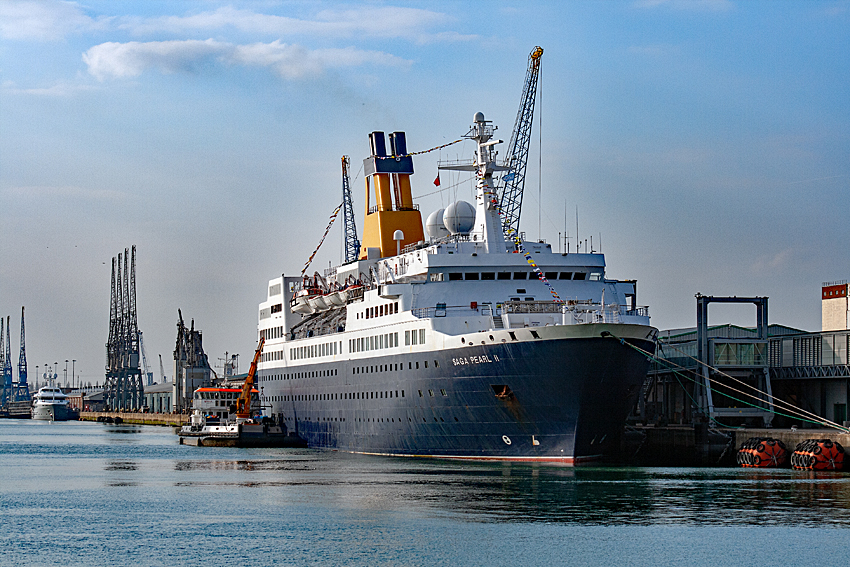
Saga Pearl II at Southampton in 2011

Saga Cruises acquired the ship, at auction, in August 2009. Saga Pearl II effectively replaced the Saga Rose which was decommissioned in 2009. In late 2009, the ship sailed to Swansea, Wales where she underwent a £20 million three-month refit, including engine overhaul, in the re-opened Swansea dry dock, after which the ship had a maximum capacity 449 passengers, served by 252 crew members. In spite of the low ratio, the cruise ship offered a luxury service to its passengers. The gross tonnage of the vessel was 18,591 gross tons. The maximum speed of the vessel was 21.4 kn (39.6 km/h; 24.6 mph). Stabilization was provided by a Pinfabb Digital Stabilizers Control system.

She sailed on her first cruise as Saga Pearl II on 15 March 2010 to the Norwegian fjords.

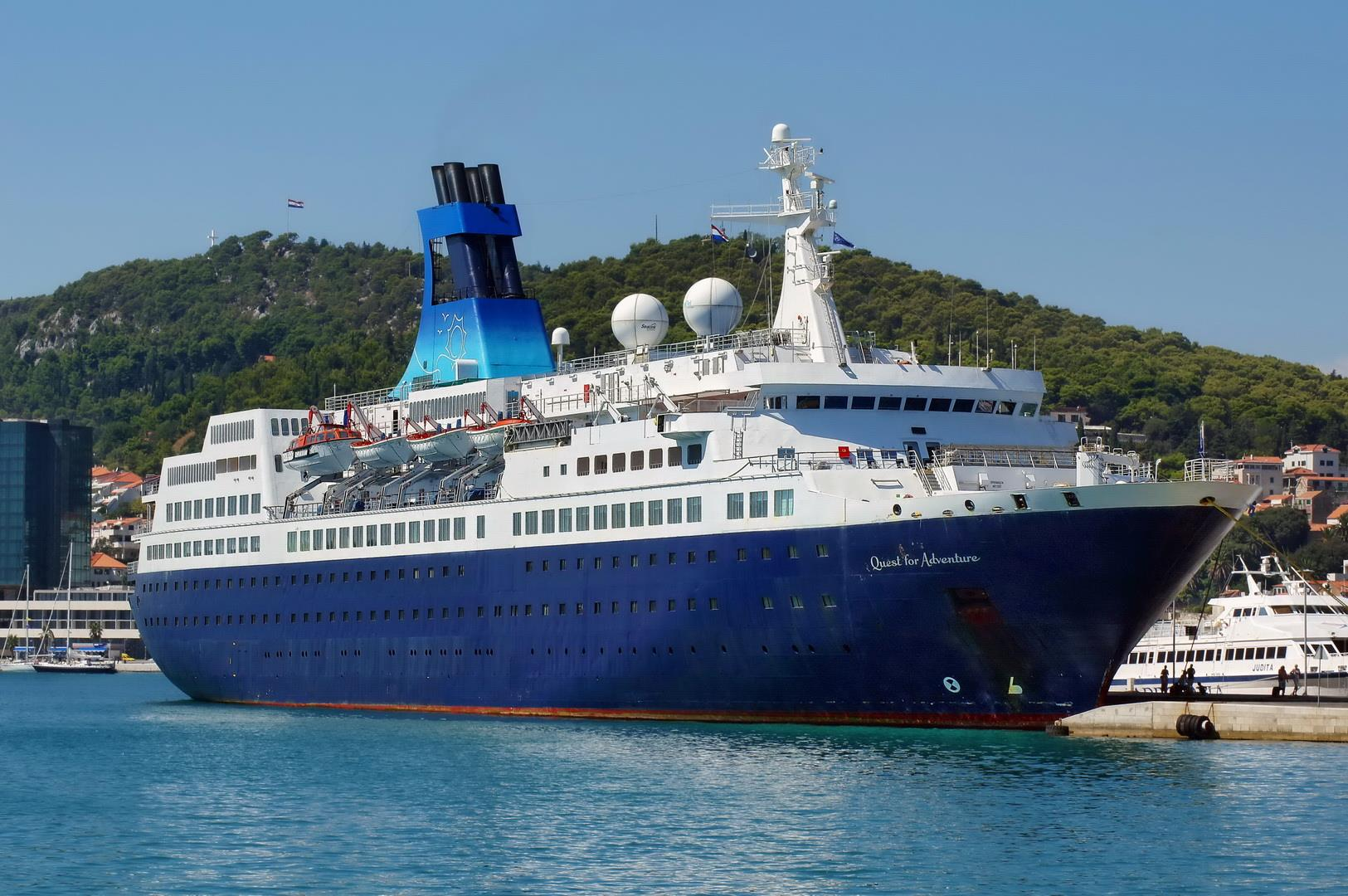
Quest for Adventure in Split, 2013

She was renamed Quest for Adventure in May 2012 and became the flagship for Saga's Discovery-style Adventure Cruises. She did not undergo a refit at that time but continued in her new role with the same facilities, captain and crew. In December 2012, Quest for Adventure underwent a refit, where she received her new Saga funnel livery. This was like her fleetmate Saga Sapphire's funnel. However, the port side of the funnel was left blank and did not display the "SAGA" logo.

The Quest for Adventure had the name Saga Pearl II restored to it on 21 November 2013 and received the "SAGA" logo on the port side of her funnel. In 2018 Saga reverted to the traditional yellow funnel livery, Saga Pearl II was the second ship to receive the yellow funnel, in late 2018.

In 2019, Saga Pearl II was replaced by Spirit of Discovery, Saga's first new build. For her last voyage Saga Pearl II sailed from Portsmouth on 16 February 2019 for a 54-day cruise to South Africa returning on 11 April. This was a coming-home cruise, as it was where the ship spent many of its earlier years, when it sailed the South Atlantic waters for Safmarine.

=== Pearl II ===
In 2019 Saga Pearl II was sold to the British Virgin Islands company Aqua Explorer Holdings, renamed Pearl II, and laid up at Salamis, Greece.

=== Pearl ===
In July 2022 the ship was renamed Pearl and was towed from Greece to Aliağa, Turkey for scrapping.

== See also ==
- MS Astor, successor of 1986

== Bibliography ==
- Bröking, Klaus (2007). MS Astor – MS Astoria: eine deutsche Geschichte (in German). Königswinter: Heel. ISBN 9783898807951.
- Plowman, Peter (2007). Australian Cruise Ships. Rosenberg Publishing. ISBN 9-7818-7705-850-9.
