= Sidney De Haan =

British buisnessman (1919-2002)

Sidney Isaac De Haan
- Born: 6 February 1919; Mile End, London, England
- Died: 16 February 2002 (aged 83); Folkestone, Kent, England
- Occupation: Businessman
- Known for: Saga Group
- Spouse: Margery Crick
- Children: 3, including Roger De Haan
- Awards: Order of the British Empire

Sidney Isaac De Haan, OBE (6 February 1919 – 16 February 2002) was the founder of Saga, an internationally known group of companies providing a wide range of services for people aged 50 and over.

== Early life ==
Born in Mile End, East London on 6 February 1919, one of the eight sons and three daughters of a shoe factory foreman, he left school at the age of 14 and began training as a chef, working at The Waldorf Hilton, London for a while. In 1939 he was called up to the Royal Army Medical Corps and was captured at Dunkirk, he spent three years in a Stalag in Eastern Europe and was then released in order to escort sick prisoners of war who were being repatriated in 1943. Upon arrival in the UK he was transferred to a hospital in the south of England where he met his wife Margery Crick, a nurse, and they married in 1945. They had three sons, David (in 1945), Roger (in 1948) and Peter (in 1952).

== Career ==
After the war, De Haan had an ambition to buy and run a small seaside hotel, so he bought the Rhodesia Hotel in Folkestone which enabled him to fulfil this wish, but he was to discover that holidaymakers did not come to Folkestone outside the brief summer season.

The De Haans noticed the large number of retired people who came to the south-east coast after the high season crowds had gone. De Haan decided to offer affordable, off-peak holidays exclusively to people who were retired. The plan was to offer them all-inclusive holidays with built-in travel by coach and three meals a day. Seeing the potential economic value in stretching the holiday season, he persuaded the local council and other traders to find ways of welcoming the retired visitors, with special offers and discounts.

De Haan soon expanded the business overseas and as Saga grew, it became impossible to continue selling all its holidays face-to-face, he began to promote Saga holidays by mail, inadvertently becoming a pioneer in what would become known as direct marketing.

When he retired in 1984 De Haan had become an established name in travel circles, and was awarded the Officer of the Order of the British Empire, for services to tourism, in the following New Year's Honours List. He had floated his company on the stock exchange in 1978 when it became the most over-subscribed issue of the year. Many Saga holidaymakers also became shareholders and demonstrated their loyalty by providing him with a high level of repeat business.

De Haan had not realised it at the time, but when he hit upon a bright idea to generate some extra revenue for his hotel, he was founding a company which, in addition to worldwide holidays and cruises, would move on to provide a plethora of insurance products, financial services, and more, all for a customer group which most advertisers ignored. In so doing it would become one of Britain's best-known brands.

He was survived by three sons, David, Peter and the retired Chairman of Saga Group Ltd, Roger De Haan.

De Haan died at his home in Folkestone, Kent, on Saturday 16 February 2002, after suffering a heart attack. Margery pre-deceased him in 1994.

In memory of Sidney De Haan, the Roger De Haan Charitable Trust funded the Sidney De Haan Research Centre led by the university's music department and the Centre for Health Education and Research in 2004 in association with Shepway Primary Care Trust and Canterbury Christ Church University. The centre is an extension of research undertaken by Professor Grenville Hancox and Professor Stephen Clift into the positive effects of music on health and well-being. The project, the first of its kind in East Kent, is one of only four in the UK. It is the first higher education venture to be carried out in Folkestone, Kent.
