= Saga Cruises =

England-based cruise line

Saga Shipping

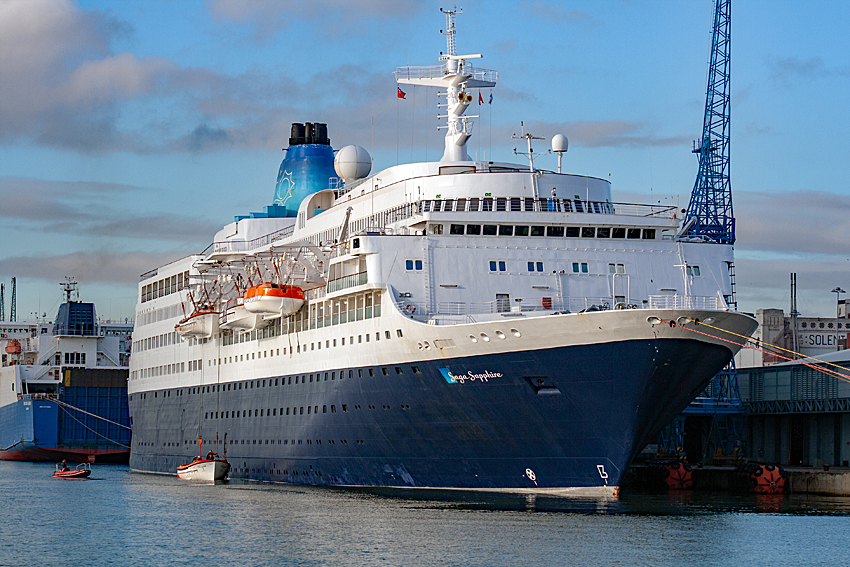
- Lifeboat drill on Saga Sapphire
- Type: Subsidiary
- Industry: Shipping, tourism
- Founded: 1996
- Headquarters: Folkestone, England
- Products: Cruises, holidays
- Parent: Saga plc
- Website: travel.saga.co.uk/cruises/ocean.aspx

Saga Shipping, also known as Saga Cruises, a division of the Saga plc, is a cruise line headquartered in Folkestone, England. Saga Cruises exclusively markets to and operates for people aged 50 and over.

== History ==
=== 1997–2005: Development ===
In 1997, Saga Group purchased its first ship, Gripsholm, from Cunard Line, after which it renamed the ship Saga Rose. The vessel was remodeled and arrived in Southampton on 14 May 1997, commencing operations thereafter. Saga Rose was briefly joined by Saga Pearl in the summer of 2003 after Saga chartered her. In November 2004, Saga purchased its second ship, Caronia, from Cunard. After a £17 million refurbishment at Malta Dockyard in 2005 she entered Saga service as Saga Ruby.

=== 2006–2013: Attempts at growth ===
In 2006, Saga founded a sub-brand, named "Spirit of Adventure," with the ship, Spirit of Adventure. The ship had most recently operated as Orange Melody as a charter for the Russian Metropolis company, and was originally set to be named Saga Opal following Saga's purchase. In 2010, Saga purchased Astoria from Transocean Tours and renamed her Saga Pearl II. In August 2011, it was reported Saga was selling Spirit of Adventure to German tour operator FTI in 2012, upon which she would become FTI Berlin. In May 2012, Saga Pearl II was transferred to the sub-brand and named Quest for Adventure. In August 2012, Saga announced the "Spirit of Adventure" sub-brand would be absorbed into its parent brand, and in November 2013, Quest for Adventure rejoined Saga and was renamed Saga Pearl II.

In 2009, Saga retired Saga Rose in 2010, citing the prohibitive repair costs due to the ship's age and the new SOLAS regulations set to become law in 2010. Her farewell cruise was scheduled for 30 October 2009. She was later laid up in Gibraltar and later scrapped in China. In July 2012, Saga announced Saga Ruby would exit the fleet in early-2014. Due to a failed generator, the ship's final cruise was changed from a Caribbean sailing to a Mediterranean sailing. She was sold in January 2014 to become a hotel ship in Myanmar, but those plans dissolved and the ship was scrapped in India in 2017.

=== 2014–present: Modernisation ===
In 2014, Saga's parent company, Saga Group, went public via an initial public offering on the London Stock Exchange.

In 2015, Saga announced it had signed a memorandum of agreement for its first-ever new-build from Meyer Werft for a 2019 delivery, with an additional option for a sister ship expected in 2021. Named Spirit of Discovery, the new ship would measure 58,250 GT, becoming the largest ship ever to be operated by Saga. In explaining how Saga intended to modernise the brand, Saga's new-build director, David Pickett, explained that after Saga went public in 2014, the company had expanded access to capital investment, opening up more possibilities to invest in its fleet. The new ship had allowed Saga to expand its offerings not featured before on its older vessels, such as fitness facilities, a large theatre, and specialty dining venues. Saga also partnered with Siemens to install their ships' propulsion and power distribution systems for the two vessels in order to maximise the ships' efficiency and ensure their reliability.

In July 2017, Saga announced it would retire Saga Pearl II in mid-2019 with a 54-night farewell cruise to South Africa from Portsmouth. The following year, Saga revealed plans to retire Saga Sapphire by 2020, with a farewell cruise to Norway. In May 2019, it was reported Saga Pearl II had been sold to Aqua Explorer Holdings of the British Virgin Islands, and the ship would be moved to Perama as a result of the sale. In August 2019, Turkey-based ANEX Tour had reportedly purchased Saga Sapphire for its first ship to launch its cruise business, with a scheduled debut in mid-2020 from Antalya. In April 2020, Saga's managing director Nigel Banks said Saga's plans to transfer Saga Sapphire to ANEX Tour may be postponed due to the COVID-19 pandemic, but on 18 June 2020, the sale was completed and it was announced the ship would debut for ANEX Tour in 2021 as Blue Sapphire.

With the exits of Saga Pearl II and Saga Sapphire, Saga completed its fleet renewal program and hoped to usher in a new era for the company, with the cruise line's first new-build delivered on 24 June 2019. But while in anticipation of her delivery, in April 2019, Saga reported it was still encountering significant financial difficulties, with its shares hitting a record low in light of lower profits. Saga blamed its losses on Brexit and the fears surrounding economic uncertainty for driving bookings and commitments to holidays down for the brand. The retirement of Saga Pearl II, combined with the increase in marketing expenditure for the brand's new ship, was also credited for Saga's declining revenue through late-2019. With the new ships joining the fleet, Saga had aimed to make £40 million in profit per ship per year and intended to strengthen its focus on its cruising and tour businesses. In November 2019, in hopes of capitalizing on the launch of Spirit of Discovery, Saga announced it had ordered a new riverboat in a new investment toward its river cruising business after it had previously chartered riverboats for its river cruise program. The new boat, named Spirit of the Rhine, would be Saga's first boutique riverboat and be heavily inspired by the design and style of Spirit of Discovery, as well as include the all-inclusive cruising experience also accommodated on Saga's ocean cruises. Scheduled to debut in spring 2021, the 190-passenger ship will cruise the Rhine, Moselle, Main, and Danube, as well as waterways in the Netherlands.

In January 2020, despite losing £4 million following the collapse of Thomas Cook Group in the second half of 2019, Saga Group claimed Spirit of Discovery played a large role in driving part of the company's success and expected the ship to make more than £20 million in her next six months of operation. Later, in April 2020, amidst the COVID-19 pandemic, Saga noted that, despite a possibility of increasing cancellations, chief executive Euan Sutherland explained Saga was positioned well to weather the economic crisis arising from the pandemic, citing strong forward bookings and available credit facilities. But in June 2020, the pandemic led Saga to announce that the debut of its second new-build, named Spirit of Adventure, would be postponed by several months due to construction delays at Meyer Werft caused by the pandemic. Later that month, Saga introduced COVID-19 treatment and repatriation to the travel insurance plans it offers to its cruise guests. Spirit of Adventure was delivered on 29 September 2020, though the pandemic has also resulted in several postponements of her public debut and maiden voyage to May 2021.

== Ocean Fleet ==
=== Current fleet ===
Ship name	Built	In Service	Gross tonnage	Flag	Notes	Image
Spirit of Discovery	2019	2019–present	58,119 GT	United Kingdom	First new-build for Saga Cruises	
Spirit of Adventure	2020	2020–present	58,119 GT	United Kingdom	Sister ship to Spirit of Discovery; Delivery and maiden voyage postponed due to the COVID-19 pandemic	

=== Former fleet ===
Ship name	Built	In Service	Gross tonnage	Notes	Image
Saga Rose	1965	1997–2010	24,528 GT	Originally operated by Norwegian America Line as Sagafjord. Laid up and scrapped.	
Saga Pearl	1989	Summer 2003	12,892 GT	Chartered by Saga in summer 2003. Later operated as Minerva for Swan Hellenic.	
Spirit of Adventure	1981	2006–2012	9,570 GT	Originally operated by Peter Deilmann Cruises as Berlin. Sold to FTI Group in 2012 for FTI Cruises and renamed FTI Berlin.	
Saga Ruby	1973	2005–2014	24,492 GT	Originally operated by Norwegian America Line as Vistafjord. Sold to become hotel in Myanmar before being scrapped in India.	
Saga Pearl II	1981	2010–2012; 2013–2019	18,627 GT	Originally operated by HADAG as Astor. Sold to Aqua Explorer Holdings. Scrapped in 2022.	
Saga Sapphire	1981	2012–2020	37,049 GT	Originally operated by Hapag-Lloyd as Europa. Sold to ANEX Tour and renamed Blue Sapphire.	

== River Fleet ==
=== Current fleet ===
Ship name	Built	In Service	Gross tonnage	Flag	Notes	Image
Spirit of the Douro	2017	2024	TBA	Portugal	Built by WestSEA in Portugal, owned by Douro Azul and operated by Saga since 2024.	
Spirit of the Rhine	2021	2021	TBA	Switzerland	Saga's first boutique riverboat. Constructed by Vahali in Serbia. Keel laid on 11 December 2019. Scheduled to debut in March 2021. Christened on 19 March 2022 in Arnhem	
Spirit of Danube	2022	2022	TBA	Switzerland	Constructed by Vahali in Serbia; Christened on 19 March 2022 in Arnhem	
Spirit of the Moselle	2023	2023	TBA		Ordered in March 2022 Constructed by Vahali in Serbia	
Spirit of the Main	2024	2024	TBA		Ordered in March 2022; Constructed by Vahali in Serbia	

=== Future fleet ===
Ship name	Built	In Service	Gross tonnage	Notes	Image
Spirit of the Elbe	2025	2025	TBA		Ordered in March 2022; Constructed by Vahali in Serbia
Spirit of the Rhône	2026	2026	TBA		Ordered in March 2022; Constructed by Vahali in Serbia
Amadeus Elegant		2023	TBA		
