= Roger De Haan =

British businessman (born 1948)

Sir Roger De Haan CBE DL
- Born: Roger Michael De Haan; October 1948 (age 77); Northampton, England
- Education: Westbrook House Preparatory School for Boys and Girls; Seaford College
- Occupation: Businessman
- Known for: Saga Group, Folkestone
- Spouses: Susan Bridget Chambers (m. 1969) Marie-Lyvie M Goder (m.1988) Alison Downey (m. 2011)
- Children: 8
- Parent(s): Sidney De Haan (father); Margery Crick (mother)
- Awards: Kt CBE DL

Sir Roger Michael De Haan, CBE, DL (born October 1948) is the son of Sidney De Haan, who created the Saga group of companies, best known for selling holidays to the over-50s market.

== Business career ==
De Haan took over Saga in 1984 when his father retired, and then ran the company with his brother Peter for a further twenty years, launching Saga-branded radio stations to accompany the group's holidays and financial services.

He chose to leave the business in 2004, selling the entire Saga Group (which included insurance and holiday businesses) to a management buyout for £1.35 billion, although he continued to run some of the radio stations himself. In that year he bought Folkestone Harbour for £11 million. The Folkestone Harbour and Seafront Development Company is promoting regeneration schemes for the area.

The Roger De Haan Charitable Trust was established in 1978, offering charitable support to a variety of charities and community organisations, mostly in the area around Folkestone and south east Kent.

Following the sale of Saga, he retained ownership of two digital radio stations, PrimeTime Radio and Saga Radio (Digital), but following continuing heavy losses decided to close them in 2006.

== Wealth ==
In April 2016, his net worth was estimated at £900 million, according to the Sunday Times Rich List.

During the 2019 United Kingdom general election, De Haan donated £125,000 to the Conservative Party and £3,000 to Damian Collins, the Conservative MP for Folkestone and Hythe.

== Honours ==
In 2003/2004 he was awarded an honorary fellowship of Canterbury Christ Church University.

De Haan was appointed Commander of the Order of the British Empire (CBE) in 2004 for services to business, education and charity in 2004 and was knighted in the 2014 New Years Honours List for services to education and to charity in Kent and overseas.

== Personal life ==
He is the father-in-law of Tinie Tempah.
