= Safmarine =

South African international shipping company

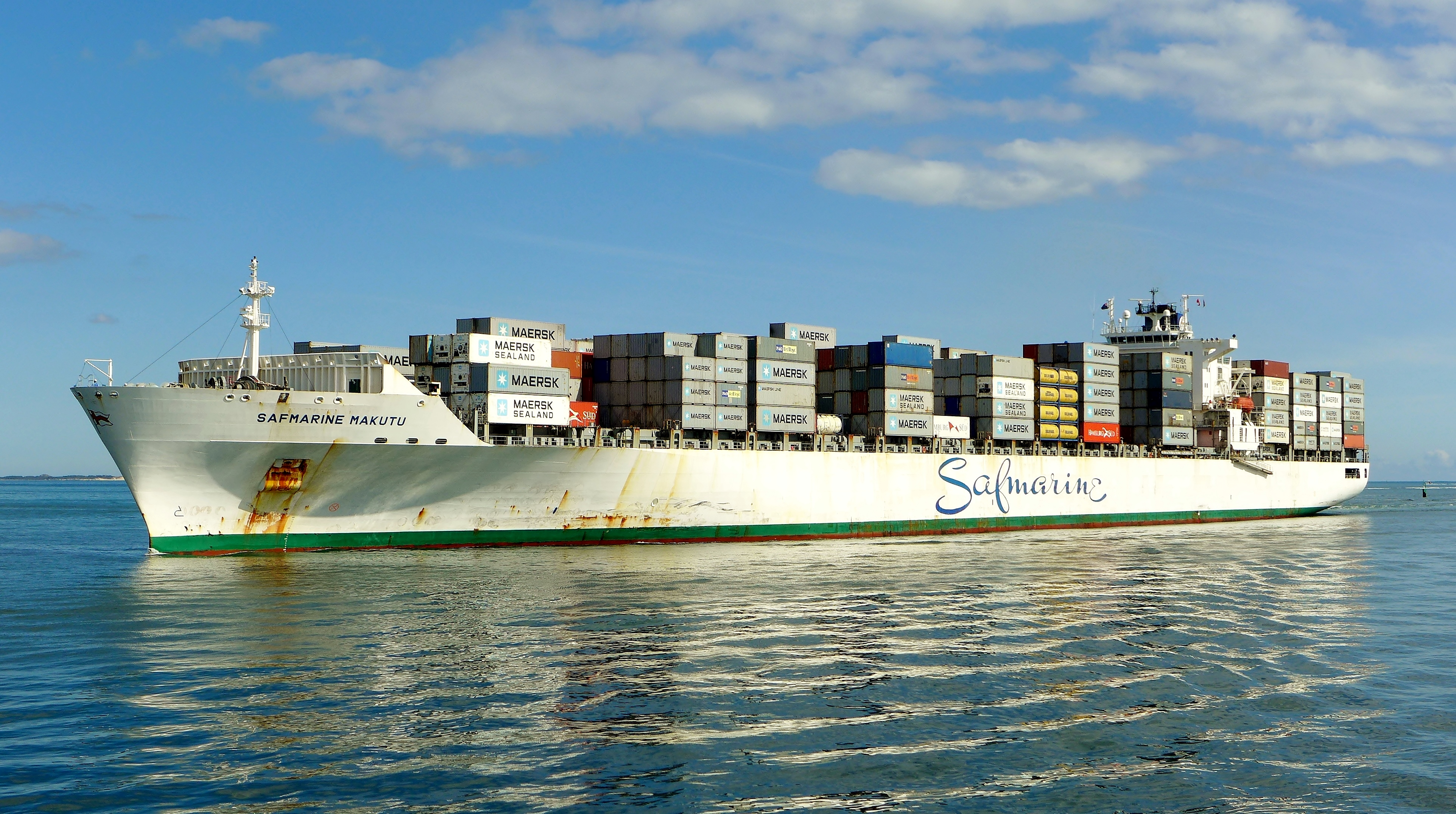
- Safmarine Makutu, one of Safmarine's container ships, is seen arriving in Fremantle, Australia in 2015.
- Type: Division
- Industry: Container shipping
- Founded: 1946
- Defunct: 2020
- Fate: sold to Maersk; part of Maersk Line
- Headquarters: Cape Town, South Africa
- Area served: Worldwide
- Key people: David Williams (CEO)
- Parent: Maersk Line

Safmarine, short for South African Marine Corporation, and latterly South African Marine Container Lines, was a South African shipping line, established in 1946, which offered freight transport services with cargo liners and container ships. It was bought by Maersk Line in 1999, and was fully integrated into that company in 2020. It also operated passenger vessels and specialised cargo ships.

== History ==
House flag of Safmarine, adopted in 1969

The company was founded in June 1946 by South African industrialists and American ship owners with three American wartime Victory ships. Hendrik van der Bijl saw the need for a South African shipping line and sought a financial partner overseas, the States Marine Corporation of New York. The three ships were renamed the Constania, Morgenster, and the Vergelegen. In 1950 it came under American control but in 1959, the Industrial Development Corporation helped finance its repurchase and returned it to South African control. It would sell its holding 1984. In 1955, four further modern steamship were purchased for £1 million each, the S.A. Merchant, S.A. Trader, S.A. Pioneer, and S.A. Transporter.

Safmarine became widely known as a north–south trade and African specialist, represented in more than 130 countries throughout the world, and employing more than 1200 seafarers. Safmarine's container line was headquartered and registered in Antwerp, Belgium, from 1996, when it completed its acquisition of the Belgian container line CMBT, which in turn had been an outgrowth of Compagnie Maritime Belge.

In 1999, Safmarine was acquired by the Danish shipping company A.P. Moller-Maersk Group, where Maersk Line chose to retain the Safmarine brand rather than integrating it wholly into Maersk Sealand. In 2002, Safmarine acquired Torm Lines. On October 3, 2011, it was decided that Safmarine would integrate its internal support and management functions into those of its sister company Maersk Line. In 2020 Safmarine was fully subsumed into Maersk Line.

== Passenger services ==
Safmarine operated a passenger liner service between the United Kingdom and South Africa between 1965 and 1977 and again between 1984 and 1985.

=== 1965 to 1977 ===
Safmarine passenger operations had begun in 1965, when two Union-Castle Line ships used on the Southampton–Durban service, RMS Transvaal Castle and Pretoria Castle, were transferred to Safmarine to satisfy demands from the South African government. The ships were renamed S. A. Vaal and S. A. Oranje respectively, re-painted in Safmarine colours but continued on the same service as before. In 1969, both vessels were transferred from British to South African registry. During the 1970s the South African liner trade started to decline, mainly due to competition from the jet airplane and the rising success of the revolutionary new container ships, in carrying cargoes more efficiently and more economically than conventional, older vessels. Thus, in 1975 the S. A. Oranje and her Union-Castle sister RMS Edinburgh Castle were withdrawn and sold for scrapping. RMS Pendennis Castle was also withdrawn in June 1976, leaving S. A. Vaal to remain with Union-Castle's RMS Windsor Castle, and the two smaller cargo/passenger mailships RMMV Good Hope Castle and RMMV Southampton Castle. In October 1977, both companies withdrew their passenger services and S. A. Vaal was sold to Carnival Cruise Lines, becoming their SS Festivale.

=== 1984 to 1986 ===
In 1984, Safmarine purchased the cruise ship MS Astor from the West German Hadag Cruise Lines. Following refit she was used to revive the Southampton–Cape Town service, also making cruises out of South Africa and the United Kingdom between liner voyages. However, in service the Astor was found not to have enough speed to maintain the liner schedule and Safmarine ordered a replacement ship based on the same design from Howaldtswerke-Deutsche Werft in Kiel, also to be named MS Astor. In preparation for the delivery of the new ship, the first Astor was sold to the East German Deutsche Seerederei via a West German intermediary, becoming MS Arkona. Ultimately the second Astor never entered service for Safmarine, as the company abandoned the liner service in 1986. The second Astor, still under construction at the time, was sold to Marlan Corporation in January 1986.

== Cargo ships ==
=== Victory Class ===
Safmarine purchased three Victory ships (Westbrook Victory, Westerly Victory, New Bern Victory) from the US and, after modifications to convert them from war use to general dry cargo, they entered service in 1947. They were named Vergelegen, Morgenster and Constantia. These three ships enabled Safmarine to start a South Africa-based cargo enterprise. In 1961, their names were changed to South African Victory, South African Venture and South African Vanguard. In 1966, the prefix South African on all Safmarine's ships was changed to S.A. In the engine rooms there were two Babcock & Wilcox water-tube boilers supplying superheated steam to two Westinghouse turbines geared down to a single shaft, giving 6,000 shaft horsepower (4,500 kW) and a speed of 16 knots (30 km/h; 18 mph). For electrical power, two steam turbines drove DC generators.

=== Global Class ===
The next four sister ships to be brought into service were South African Trader, South African Pioneer, South African Transporter and South African Merchant. They were designed for carrying general dry cargo and had berths for twelve passengers. All were built in Scotland and entered service in the mid-1950s. Each ship had two Yarrow water-tube boilers and two Parson type turbines geared down to a single shaft, giving approximately 7,000 shp (5,200 kW) and a speed of 15 knots (28 km/h; 17 mph). For electrical power, three Ruston Hornsby diesel engines drove DC generators.

=== "S" Class ===
In 1961, South African Statesman, South African Seafarer, and South African Shipper joined the fleet. They were designed for carrying general dry cargo, and were built in Scotland in the 1950s for the Clan Line then the Springbok Shipping Co. These ships had a distinctive cowl top on the funnel and were fitted with Babcock & Wilcox water-tube boilers and three Parson type turbines geared down to a single shaft, giving approximately 10,000 shp (7,500 kW) and a speed of 17 knots (31 km/h; 20 mph). Electrical power came from generators driven by three Ruston Hornsby diesel engines.

=== Refrigerated ships ===
Three refrigerated motor ships S.A. Langkloof, S.A. Zebediela, and S.A. Hexrivier were built to export temperature controlled fruit from South Africa to the UK and Europe. They were built in Dutch yards and entered service in early to mid-1960s. They were powered by an eight-cylinder MAN K8Z70/120 low speed two-stroke diesel engine developing approximately 9,600 BHP and a speed of 17 knots (31 km/h; 20 mph). For electrical power, four MAN diesel engines drove AC alternators.

Three further ships, S.A. Letaba, S.A. Tzaneen and S.A. Drakenstein were built in Scotland, entering service in the mid-1960s. They had the same hull design as the Dutch-built ships but used B&W engines at approximately 9,650 BHP.

=== Heavy lift ships ===
The following three sister ships were the heavy lift vessels in the Safmarine fleet, also for carrying general cargo. S.A. Van Der Stel, S.A. Weltevreden, and S.A. Nederburg were all built by a Dutch company, and entered service in the mid-1960s. The S.A. Van Der Stel could lift 250 tons with her own derricks and the other two could lift 125 tons. They were all powered by a six-cylinder MAN K6Z86/160 low-speed two-stroke diesel engine, developing approximately 14,000 BHP and a speed of 21 knots. For electrical power three MAN diesel engines drove AC alternators. These ships were modified in Japan in 1975/1976. An additional hold specially designed for containers approximately 100' long was added amidships. A new heavy lift derrick was added and loading points were added on deck for container mounting.

A further sister ship, S.A. Vergelegen was commissioned in 1969; she had a 250 ton Stulken heavy lift derrick and the number 3/4 and 5/6 holds had been extended. She was last known as the Virgil prior to being decommissioned after 1987. S.A. Nederburg was decommissioned in 1987 after leaving Durban harbour via Australia to the Far East to be dismantled.

=== Alphen Class ===
These were the last of the dry cargo ships to be built in the 1960s for Safmarine. "S.A. Alphen" and "S.A. Huguenot" came into service in the mid-1960s, and later "S.A. Constantia", "S.A. Morgenster", and "S.A. Vergelegen" were built to the same design in Japan. S.A. Vergelegen was later modified in Germany with a Stulken derrick capable of lifting 250 tons. This class of vessel had the most pleasing lines of all the dry cargo ships built for the corporation. They were powered by a six-cylinder Sulzer 6RND90 two-stroke diesel engine developing 15,000 BHP giving them a speed of 21 knots. For electrical power two eight-cylinder and two six-cylinder MAN diesel engines drove AC alternators.

== Container ships ==
Safmarine had eight of its newest dry cargo ships lengthened to carry a small number of containers. It was the time for Safmarine to get into the container business which was starting to change the way cargo was transported all around the world.

An order was placed with French ship building yards to build four large container ships with all the latest designs and technology that was available at that time. They were all completed between 1977 and 1978. They were named "S.A. Helderberg" "S.A. Sederberg" "S.A. Waterberg" and "S.A. Winterberg". These ships were fitted with two large diesel engines, two bow thrusters, stabilizers, and full airconditioning which included the engine control room. There also was luxury accommodation for ten passengers.

Early in their service, they were affectionately called "The Big Whites" because of their large size and gleaming white hulls that reflected the African sun, on their regular voyages to African ports. Their specifications were as follows:

- Two Sulzer eight cylinder two-stroke diesel engines which are Type 8RND 90M
- Maximum power: 49600 BHP
- Length: 258.5 metres
- Breath: 32.3 metres
- Approx. Tonnage: 52,615 dwt
- Container Capacity: 2450 TEU then later on increased to 2500 TEU.
- Reefer Container Capacity: 892 TEU then later on increased to 1100 TEU.
- Cruising speed: 19.5 knots.
- Fuel consumption per 24 hours: 153 tons.

When the ships were built, they had Crepelle V16 diesel generators (which ran on diesel fuel) fitted which proved to be very unreliable. They were later on replaced with 6-cylinder Wartsila engines that ran on heavy fuel oil (bunker C) the same as the main engines.

Shaft generators were fitted so that when running at cruising speed these generators produced a large amount of electrical energy, which made these ships more fuel efficient.

Safmarine was acquired by Maersk Line in 1999. Present Safmarine ships under Maersk include the N-Class Vessels (Safmarine Nile, Nuba, Nakuru etc.), K-Class vessels, M-Class vessels, and C-Class vessels.

== Arms ==
Coat of arms of Safmarine

Notes
Arms originally granted under letters patent dated 15 September 1960 by the College of Arms.
Crest
Out of a naval crown Or sails Argent three protea flowers slipped and leaved Proper.
Escutcheon
Azure a representation of the Continent of Africa Or over all an Anchor fouled counterchanged.
Supporters
Dexter a blue wildebeest and sinister zebra both Proper.
Motto
Celer Atque Fidelis
