= Spirit of Discovery (2019) =

Cruise ship operated by Saga Cruises

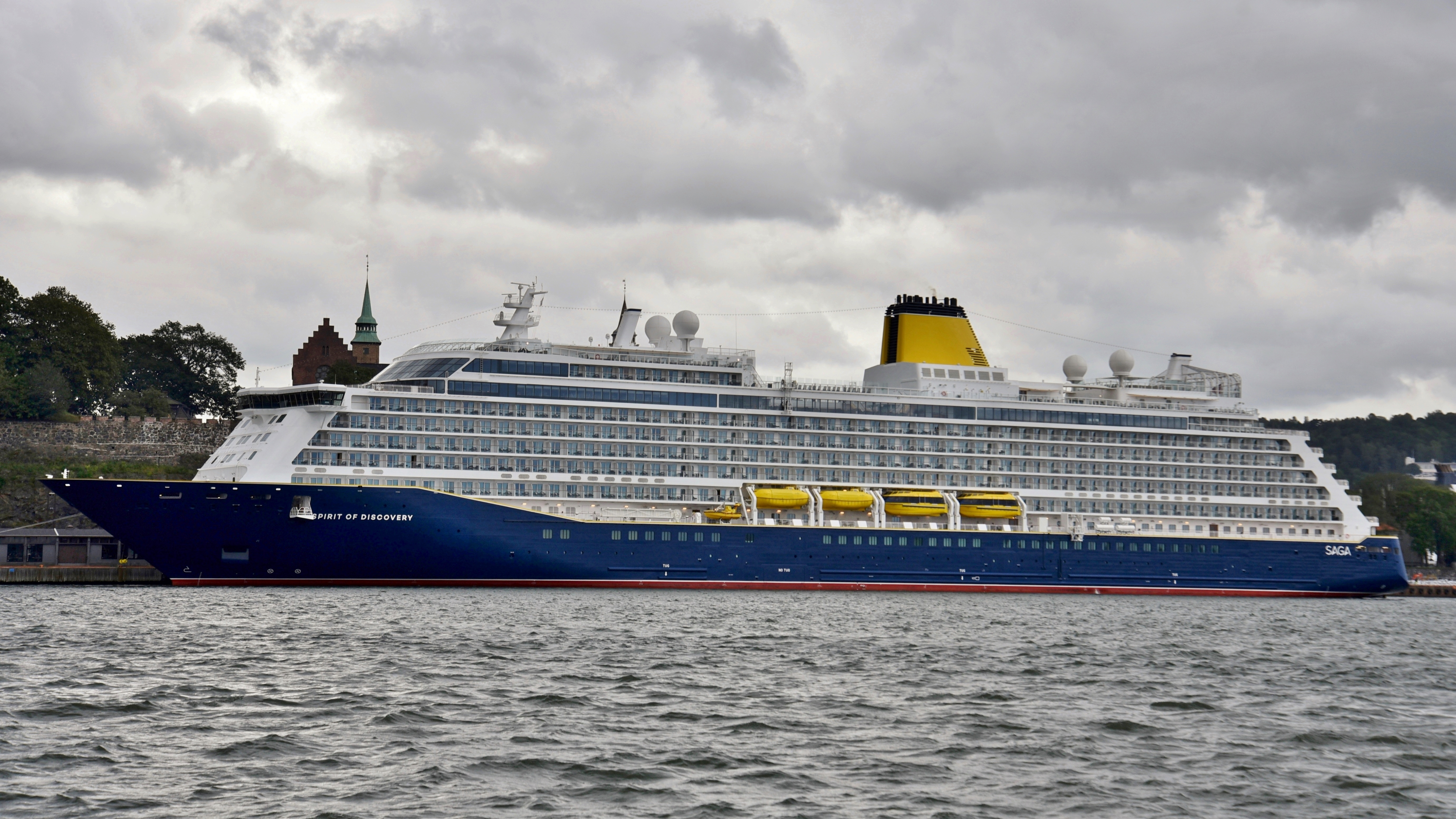
- Spirit of Discovery at Oslo, August 2019

History

United Kingdom
- Name: Spirit of Discovery
- Owner: Saga Group
- Operator: Saga Cruises
- Port of registry: London, United Kingdom
- Ordered: 1 October 2015
- Builder: Meyer Werft; Papenburg, Germany
- Yard number: 714
- Laid down: 28 June 2018
- Launched: 12 May 2019
- Sponsored by: Camilla, Duchess of Cornwall
- Christened: 5 July 2019
- In service: 2019–present
- Identification: Call sign: MEYE7; IMO number: 9802683; MMSI number: 232021171
- Status: In service

General characteristics
- Tonnage: 58,250 GT
- Length: 236 m (774 ft 3 in)
- Beam: 31.2 m (102 ft 4 in)
- Decks: 10 passenger decks
- Capacity: 999 passengers
- Crew: 523

Spirit of Discovery is a 58,250 gross tonnage (GT) cruise ship operating for Saga Cruises. Built by Meyer Werft, the ship was delivered on 24 June 2019 and began operations on 10 July 2019. Upon delivery, she became Saga's first ever new-build ship. She is Saga's largest ship to ever operate in its history, a title she will share with her sister ship, Spirit of Adventure, after she was delivered in September 2020.

== History ==
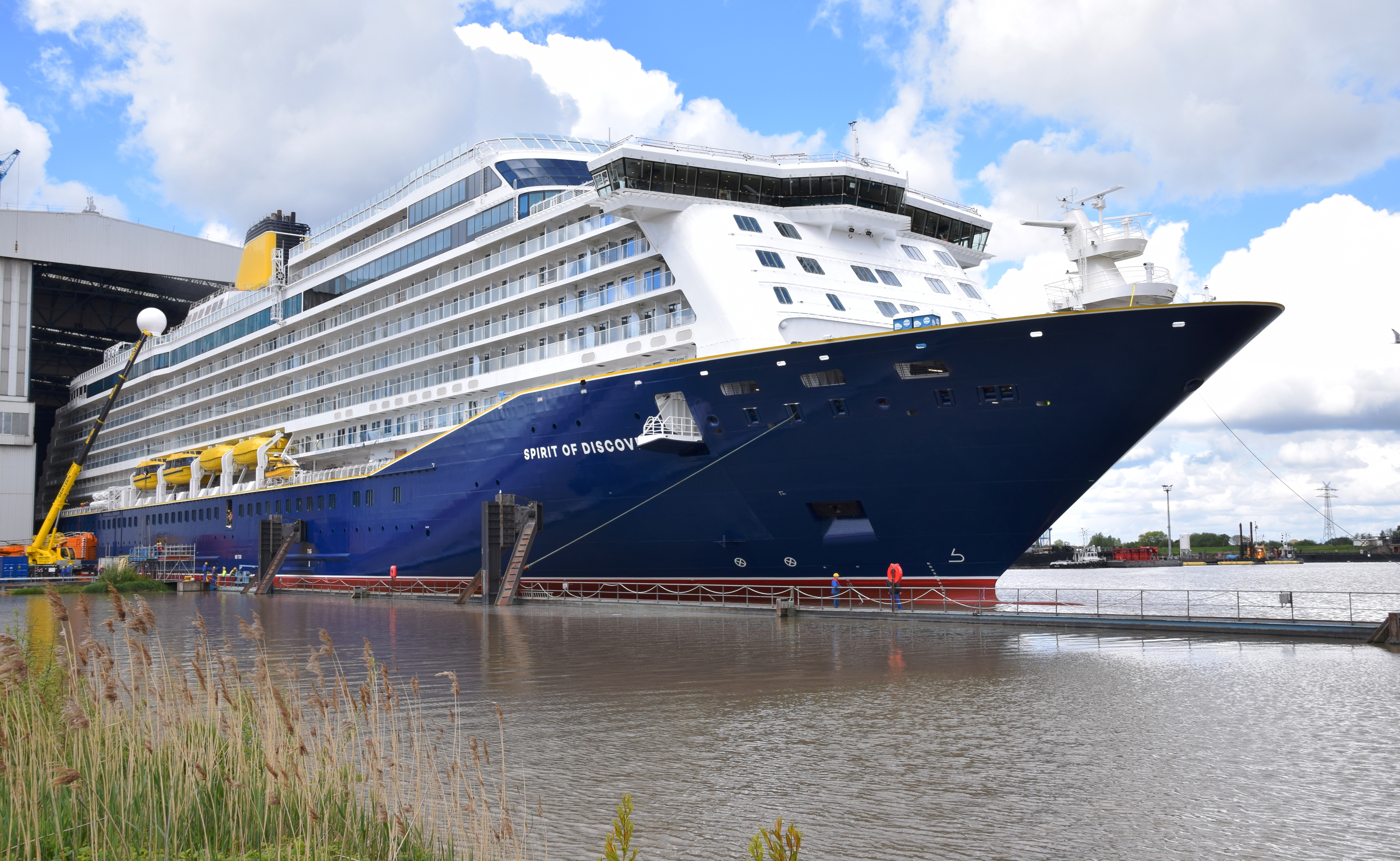
Spirit of Discovery at Meyer Werft, May 2019

Spirit of Discovery i the port of Ystad 16 september 2026.

=== Planning and construction ===
In October 2015, Saga Cruises, which had previously purchased secondhand vessels, ordered its first new build from Meyer Werft for a scheduled 2019 delivery. The order also came with an option for an identical sister ship scheduled to be delivered in 2021.

On 29 March 2017, the ship's name was announced as Spirit of Discovery. On 1 March 2018, the first steel was cut for Spirit of Discovery at Meyer Werft. Construction officially began with her keel-laying and coin ceremonies on 28 June 2018. On 12 May 2019, she was floated out and later completed her conveyance across the river Ems on 26 May 2019 to begin her sea trials in the North Sea.

Spirit of Discovery was delivered on 24 June 2019. Shortly after her delivery, she incurred an incident when she collided with bollards at the Great Sea Lock upon leaving Emden on the evening of 24 June. She only sustained several superficial abrasions and scratches, but the bollards received significant damage. She arrived in England on 28 June. On 5 July 2019, Camilla, Duchess of Cornwall christened Spirit of Discovery at the Port of Dover, making her the first ship to be christened in Dover in more than a decade.

=== Operational career ===
Spirit of Discovery sailed her maiden voyage on 10 July 2019, which circumnavigated the United Kingdom and included calls in Ireland. Throughout her inaugural season, she sailed throughout Northern Europe, Spain, and the Mediterranean. In January 2021, the ship sailed her longest voyage up to then, a circumnavigation of South America. In November 2023, she was caught in a storm in the Bay of Biscay, causing injuries to significant numbers of passengers and forcing the ship to return to the departure port of Portsmouth (the ship was already on its way to Portsmouth).

== Design and specifications ==
Describing how Saga retained its brand's experience with the debut of Spirit of Discovery, David Pickett, newbuild director of Saga, explains:

Our ship is of quite an unusual size in the modern marketplace. There are not many ships of 999-passenger capacity. It was the right size for us, as the Saga experience is typified by small ship style, high standards of customer service and a friendly ship where there is a strong relationship between customers and crew. The ship is 236 m long, 100 m less than mega ships. We have a high crew to passenger ratio. Saga Cruises is a premium brand.

Spirit of Discovery also houses several specialty restaurants, a theater, and fitness and wellness facilities, features not included on the fleet's previous vessels. Additionally, Saga designed Spirit of Discovery for an all-inclusive cruising experience, in which the cost of the cruise covers expenses incurred from beverages, gratuities, specialty dining, room service, internet access, and local chauffeur services. Spirit of Discovery also offers 100 passenger cabins designed for solo travelers and employs 523 crew members.

Saga partnered with Siemens to employ Siemens SISHIP SiPODs for the ship's propulsion and power distribution systems. The ship is powered by four nine-cylinder 32/44 common rail MAN engines equipped with selective catalytic reduction, each producing 5,400 kilowatts (7,200 hp), for a total of 21,600 kilowatts (29,000 hp). To better recover waste heat, the ship is also equipped with a centralised heating water system that reduces pump power by 65 kW to save 200 MWh per annum. Spirit of Discovery is built to Polar Code.
