= Acromas Holdings =

Acromas Holdings Ltd
- Company type: Private limited company
- Industry: Holding company
- Founded: 18 May 2007
- Headquarters: Folkestone, Kent, United Kingdom
- Key people: Lloyd East, CEO
- Website: www.acromas.com

Acromas Holdings is a holding company formed in May 2007 by Charterhouse Capital Partners, CVC Capital Partners and Permira, to act as the parent company of Automobile Association and Saga, ahead of the companies' mergers in September 2007.

Saga became listed on the London Stock Exchange in May 2014, through an initial public offering in which Acromas sold all its shares. The AA became listed on the London Stock Exchange in June 2014, through an initial public offering in which Acromas also sold all its shares.

Acromas was subsequently placed in members' voluntary liquidation in April 2017.
