= Spirit of Adventure (2020 ship) =

Cruise ship operated by Saga Cruises

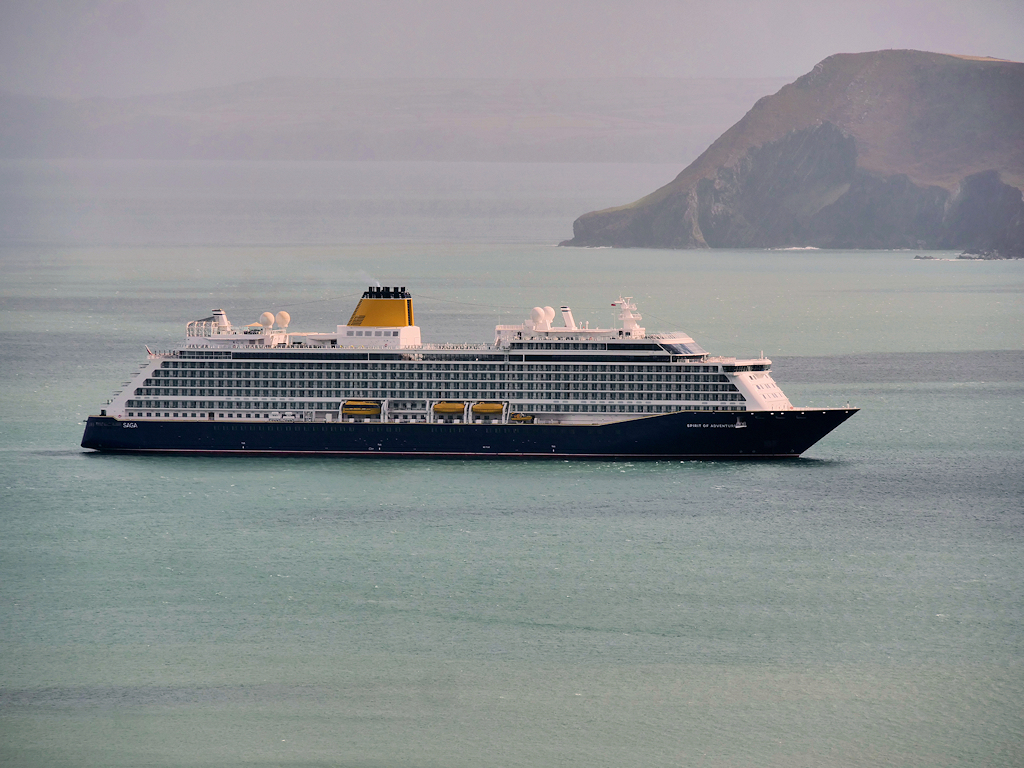
- Spirit of Adventure in Fishguard Bay

History

United Kingdom
- Name: Spirit of Adventure
- Owner: Saga Group
- Operator: Saga Cruises
- Port of registry: London, United Kingdom
- Ordered: 22 September 2017
- Builder: Meyer Werft; Papenburg, Germany
- Yard number: 715
- Laid down: 3 June 2019
- Launched: 24 July 2020
- Sponsored by: Inga Kennedy
- Christened: 19 July 2021
- Acquired: 29 September 2020
- Maiden voyage: 26 July 2021
- In service: 2021–present
- Identification: IMO number: 9818084; Call sign: MGWT8; MMSI number: 232026551
- Status: In service

General characteristics
- Tonnage: 58,199 GT
- Length: 236.6 m (776 ft)
- Beam: 31.2 m (102 ft)
- Draught: 7.6 m (25 ft)
- Decks: 15
- Installed power: 21.6 MW (29,000 hp) (total power)
- Speed: 18 kn (33 km/h; 21 mph) (service speed)
- Capacity: 999 passengers
- Crew: 540

Spirit of Adventure is a cruise ship operated by Saga Cruises and constructed by Meyer Werft in Papenburg, Germany. As Saga's second new-build vessel, she was originally considered as an option in the cruise line's pursuit to renew its fleet, but the company finalised the order in 2017 after seeing rising profits in its travel business following the announcement of her sister ship, Spirit of Discovery. Her keel was laid on 3 June 2019 and she was delivered on 29 September 2020, but in response to travel restrictions caused by the COVID-19 pandemic, the inaugural cruise was continuously postponed until she officially debuted on 26 July 2021.

Spirit of Adventure operates under Saga's business model of targeting guests ages 50 and over and shares many of the same dimensions with her sister ship, but includes a different interior design to better distinguish her identity as a distinct vessel in the fleet.

== Design ==
Along with her sister ship, Spirit of Discovery, Spirit of Adventure operates under Saga's model of exclusively serving guests of ages 50 and over. All voyages aboard the ship will also include Saga's "all-inclusive" cruising experience, in which the cost of the cruise covers expenses incurred from beverages, gratuities, specialty dining, room service, internet access, and local chauffeur services to the port. Saga also commissioned a separate firm for the ship's interior to craft an environment unique to her through new decor, a modified variety of accommodations and eateries, and redesigned lounge venues.

Spirit of Adventure is designed to match her sister ship's dimensions, measuring 58,250 GT, 236 metres (774 ft) long, and 31.2 metres (102 ft) wide, and will also have 554 all-balcony passenger cabins housing a total of 999 guests. Saga partnered with Siemens to employ Siemens SISHIP SiPODs for the ships' propulsion and power distribution systems. The ships are powered by four nine-cylinder 32/44 common rail MAN engines equipped with selective catalytic reduction, each producing 5,400 kilowatts (7,200 hp), for a total of 21,600 kilowatts (29,000 hp). To better recover waste heat, they are also equipped with a centralised heating water system that reduces pump power by 65 kW to save 200 MWh per annum.

== Construction ==
On 30 September 2015, Saga announced it had signed a memorandum of agreement with German shipbuilder Meyer Werft for a new-build ship, along with the option for a second new-build, scheduled for 2019 and 2021 deliveries, respectively. On 22 September 2017, Saga confirmed its plans with Meyer Werft for its second new-build after firming up the option and also announced the new ship's name as Spirit of Adventure. Saga explained that the decision to expand its fleet of its first-ever set of new-build vessels stemmed from strong demand for its first new-build on order, Spirit of Discovery, coupled with the desire to further its investment in its fleet after seeing its travel business's profits rise. Spirit of Adventure replaces Saga Sapphire, whose sale was completed in June 2020.

On 27 March 2019, Saga held the steel-cutting ceremony for Spirit of Adventure at Meyer Werft in Papenburg, Germany, marking the beginning of construction for the vessel. On 3 June 2019, Saga held the keel laying ceremony, in which a coin inscribed with the ship's name, keel laying date, and yard number of 715, was placed under the first of 54 keel blocks slated for the ship. Her integral components, including the ship's bow and cabin blocks, were assembled by 10 January 2020. The ship was floated into a wet dock in late-March 2020 to begin her outfitting. On 24 July 2020, following the installation of her propellers, she was floated out from the building hall, after which her funnel was installed and final outfitting began. She undertook her Ems conveyance to Emden on 30 August 2020 and underwent her sea trials in the North Sea in September.

Construction for Spirit of Adventure encountered delays arising from the COVID-19 pandemic. She was originally expected to be delivered in July 2020 and was scheduled to be christened at the Portsmouth International Port on 19 August 2020. But on 29 May 2020, Saga announced her delivery and subsequent debut in August 2020 would be postponed after Meyer Werft informed Saga that the shipyard had been significantly impacted by work and travel restrictions as a result of the pandemic. She was delivered on 29 September 2020 in Emden and was christened by nurse and senior Royal Navy officer Inga Kennedy on 19 July 2021 in Portsmouth.

== Service history ==
Spirit of Adventure was originally scheduled to offer a preview sailing for members of the travel industry and press on 11 August 2020, but after announcement of the ship's postponement of delivery, Saga announced it had not decided if it would postpone or cancel the sailing altogether. Her maiden cruise, a 17-night Baltic cruise from Dover, was originally scheduled for 21 August 2020, but was eventually changed to a 17-day Mediterranean sailing departing on 5 November 2020 from Southampton, visiting Gibraltar, Barcelona, Monaco, and Naples. For her inaugural season, she had been expected to operate cruises to the Norwegian fjords and the Mediterranean. At the ship's delivery ceremony on 29 September 2020, Saga announced the ship's inaugural plans had been further modified by postponing her inaugural cruise to 4 May 2021. Saga Cruises eventually opened bookings for the ship in March 2021 for a further postponed debut season and the ship officially debuted on her inaugural voyage on 26 July 2021 for a 15-night sailing around the British Isles.
