= Saga plc =

British company

- Type: Public
- Traded as: LSE: SAGA
- Industry: Insurance; Travel; Financial services
- Founded: 1951
- Headquarters: Folkestone, Kent, United Kingdom
- Key people: Roger De Haan (Chairman); Mike Hazell (Group Chief Executive Officer)
- Revenue: ▲£660.0 million (2026)
- Operating income: ▲£70.7 million (2026)
- Net income: ▲£3.6 million (2026)
- Website: corporate.saga.co.uk

Saga is a British company focused on serving the needs of those aged 50 and over, originally owned by its founder, later acquired by private equity, and ultimately listed on the London Stock Exchange. It has 2.7 million customers. The company operates sites on the Kent and Sussex coast: Enbrook Park and Priory Square. It is listed on the London Stock Exchange and is a constituent of the FTSE 250 Index.

== History ==
=== 1951–2020 ===
The business was founded by Sidney De Haan in 1951 and was passed to his son Roger De Haan who took over in 1984 after his father's retirement. Saga was acquired by staff (20%) backed by the private equity firm Charterhouse in October 2004. In 2007 Saga merged with The AA (owned by private equity firms CVC and Permira) to form Acromas Holdings until it was demerged in 2014.

In July 2011, Saga acquired Allied Healthcare. On 31 January 2015, it wrote it down to zero, and then sold it, at a small net profit, to Aurelius Group in December 2015.

In May 2014, Saga Group Ltd was successfully listed on the London Stock Exchange as Saga PLC. Also in 2014, Saga acquired Bolton based luxury holiday company Destinology.

In January 2020, Saga appointed Euan Sutherland as CEO of the Saga Group. At the same time, Saga's escorted touring brand Titan Travel was put up for sale, a process paused due to the coronavirus pandemic that started that year.

=== Since 2020, debt problems ===
In 2019 the company issued a profit warning and since then struggled to reduce its debt. Part of the strategy has been to sell off assets.

In February 2020, Saga sold its motorcycle insurance business, Bennetts, to Atlanta Investment Holdings Ltd, part of the Ardonagh group, for £26 million.

In March 2020, Saga sold its Patricia White's and Country Cousins domiciliary care agencies, now rebranded as Trinity Homecare, to private equity firm Limerston Capital for a reported £14 million.

In June 2020 Saga Care at Home permanently closed, which was the end of Saga's involvement in the homecare sector. Care at Home's assets were assigned to another care provider.

In November 2023, Euan Sutherland resigned as chief executive effective from January 2024 after serving for four years. He was replaced by the company's finance director Mike Hazell.

== Operations ==
Saga's operations include:

- Saga Holidays provides package holidays and tours across the globe. It owns and operates the cruise ships Spirit of Discovery and Spirit of Adventure (Note: The ship was delivered on 29 September 2020, but in response to travel restrictions caused by the COVID-19 pandemic, Saga postponed the inaugural cruise until 26 July 2021.) as well as Titan Travel and luxury holiday company Destinology.
- Saga Services provides a wide range of Insurance products, Motor, Home, Travel, Caravan, Pet, Private Medical, Life Insurance, Motorhome.
- Saga Personal Finance provides savings accounts, credit cards, travel money, financial advice, equity release, share dealing, annuities, life assurance & long term care funding advice.
- Saga SOS Personal Alarms.
- Saga also owns direct mail and fulfilment service Metro Mail.

== Magazine ==
Saga operates a subscription magazine, Saga Magazine, with a circulation of 627,000 and a readership of one million per month; it has been described as the "United Kingdom's biggest selling monthly subscription title". Founded by Paul Bach, under his editorship, it became Britain's biggest selling monthly magazine.

== Television campaign ==
In 2021 Saga launched a television advertising campaign called Experience is Everything with actor Nicholas Farrell.
