= Sagafjord =

Former Norwegian and British liner/cruise ship entering service in 1965

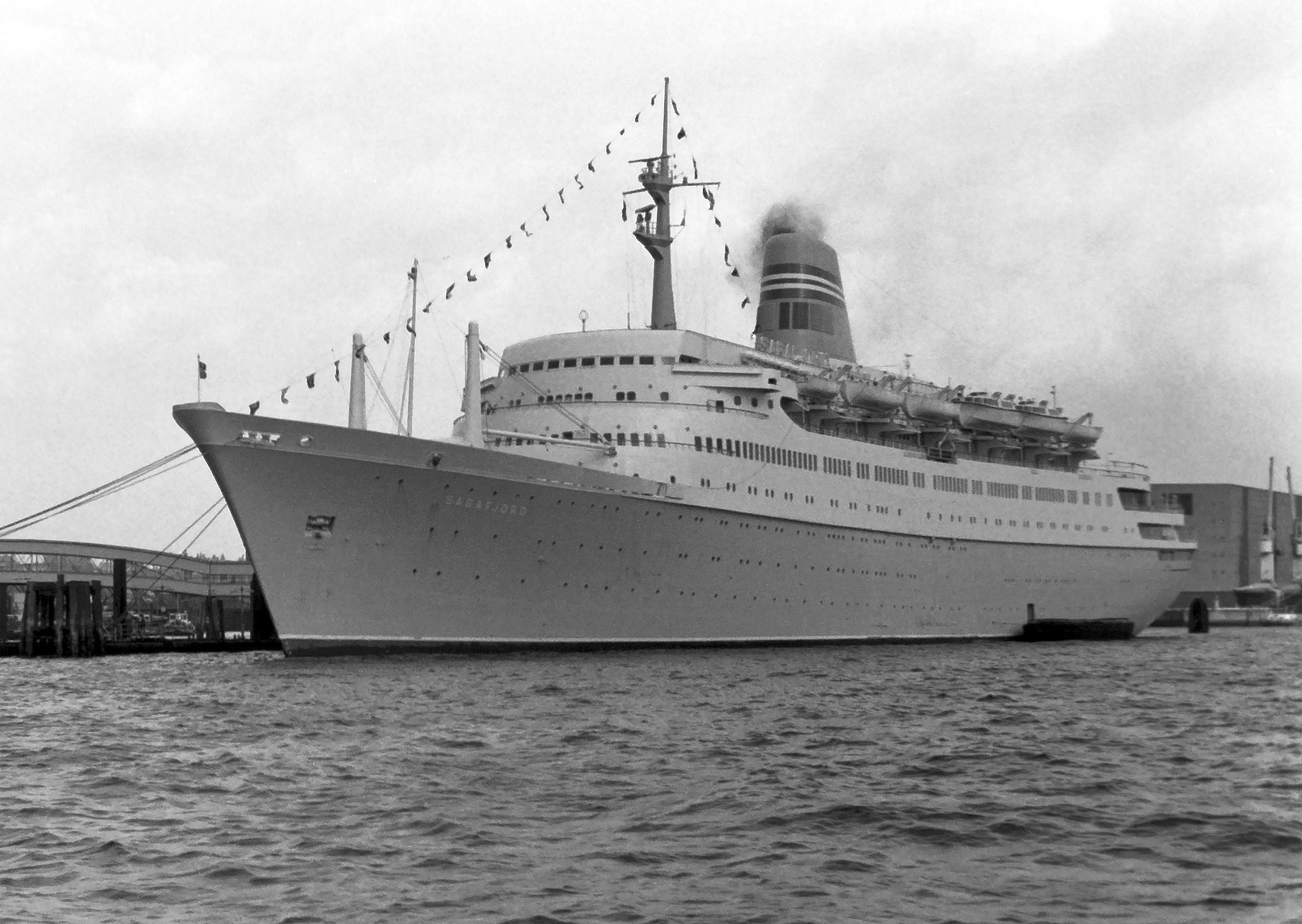
- Sagafjord in Hamburg, 1969.

History
- Name: 1965–1983: Sagafjord; 1983-1996: Cunarder; 1996–1997: Gripsholm; 1997–2009: Saga Rose
- Owner: 1965–1983: Norwegian America Line; 1983–1997: Cunard; 1997–2009: Saga Cruises
- Operator: 1965–1983: Norwegian America Line; 1983–1996: Cunard; 1996–1997: Transocean Tours; 1997–2009: Saga Cruises
- Port of registry: 1965–1983: Oslo, Norway; 1983-2009 Nassau, Bahamas
- Ordered: 24 September 1962
- Builder: Société Nouvelle des Forges et Chantiers de la Méditerranée, France
- Cost: $30 million
- Yard number: 1366
- Laid down: 21 June 1963
- Launched: 13 June 1964
- Completed: 1965
- Maiden voyage: 1965
- In service: 1965
- Out of service: October 2009
- Identification: IMO number: 6416043
- Fate: Scrapped 2010 in Jiangyin, China
- Notes: Beached for scrap

General characteristics
- Tonnage: 24,528 GT
- Length: 189 m (620.1 ft)
- Beam: 24.4 m (80.1 ft)
- Draft: 8.25 m (27.1 ft)
- Capacity: 584 (double occupancy), 620 (full occupancy)
- Crew: 350
- Notes: Data from 'Cruise Reviews' and 'Passenger Ship Society'

Sagafjord was an ocean liner built in 1965 by Société Nouvelle des Forges et Chantiers de la Méditerranée for Norwegian America Line as a combined ocean liner/cruise ship. Between 1983 and 1996 the Sagafjord was operated by Cunard as the Cunarder. In 1996–1997 she was briefly operated by Transocean Tours as the Gripsholm prior to being sold to Saga. She was last owned and operated by Saga Cruises on worldwide cruises targeted at the senior market out of the United Kingdom, known as the Saga Rose . She was retired in 2009 and scrapped in 2010.

== Concept and construction ==
The Sagafjord was built by Société Nouvelle des Forges et Chantiers de la Méditerranée, France, who received the original plans and specifications for the vessel from the Norwegian America Line during the summer of 1960. The build contract was undertaken on 24 September 1962 with the keel laid on 21 June 1963 before her launch on 13 June 1964. She underwent sea trials from May until September in 1965 and was finally christened Sagafjord on 18 September 1965 in Toulon. The construction of the Sagafjord was so expensive that it put the shipyard out of business.

== Service history ==
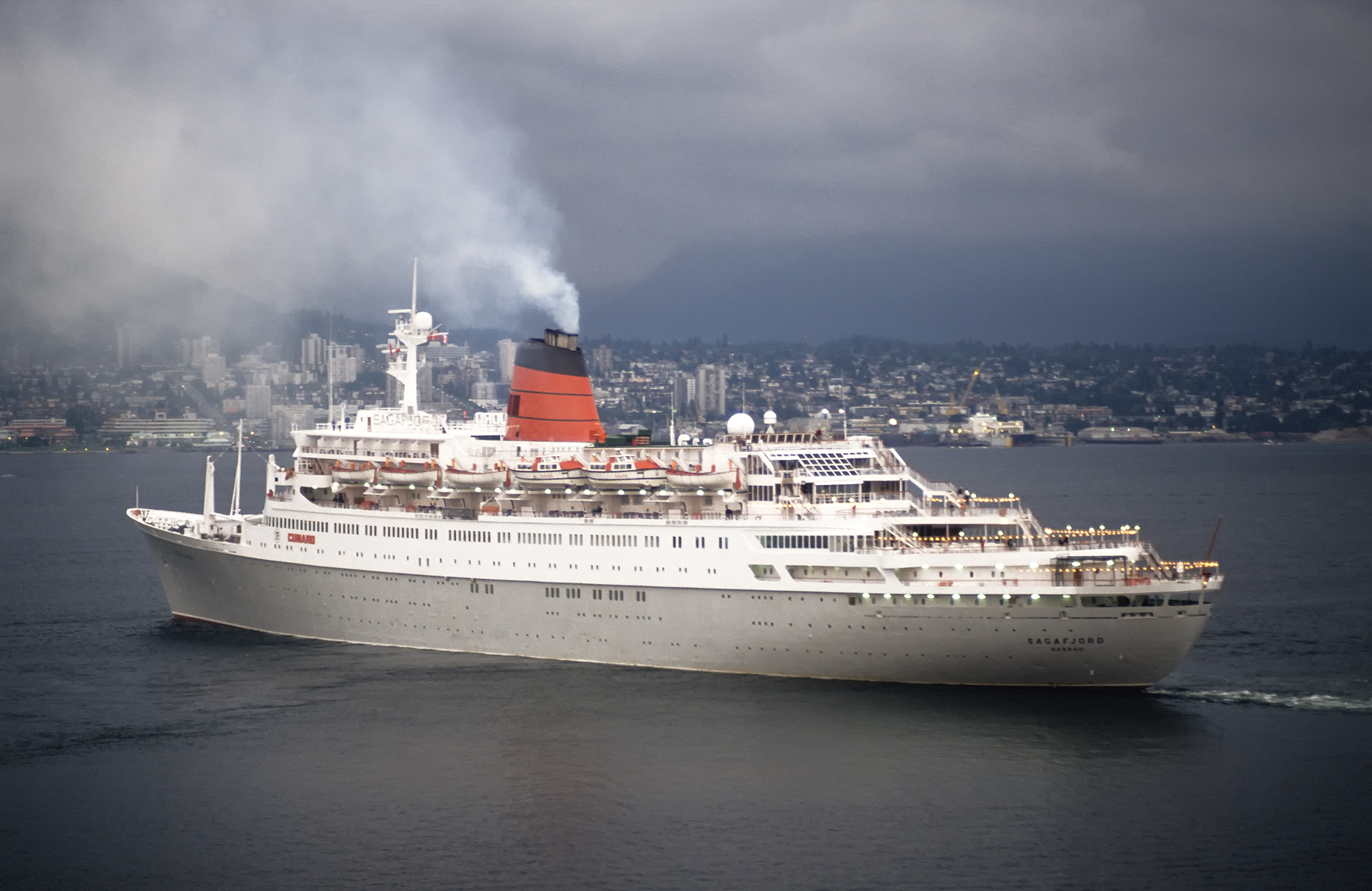
Sagafjord in Vancouver harbor, 1992

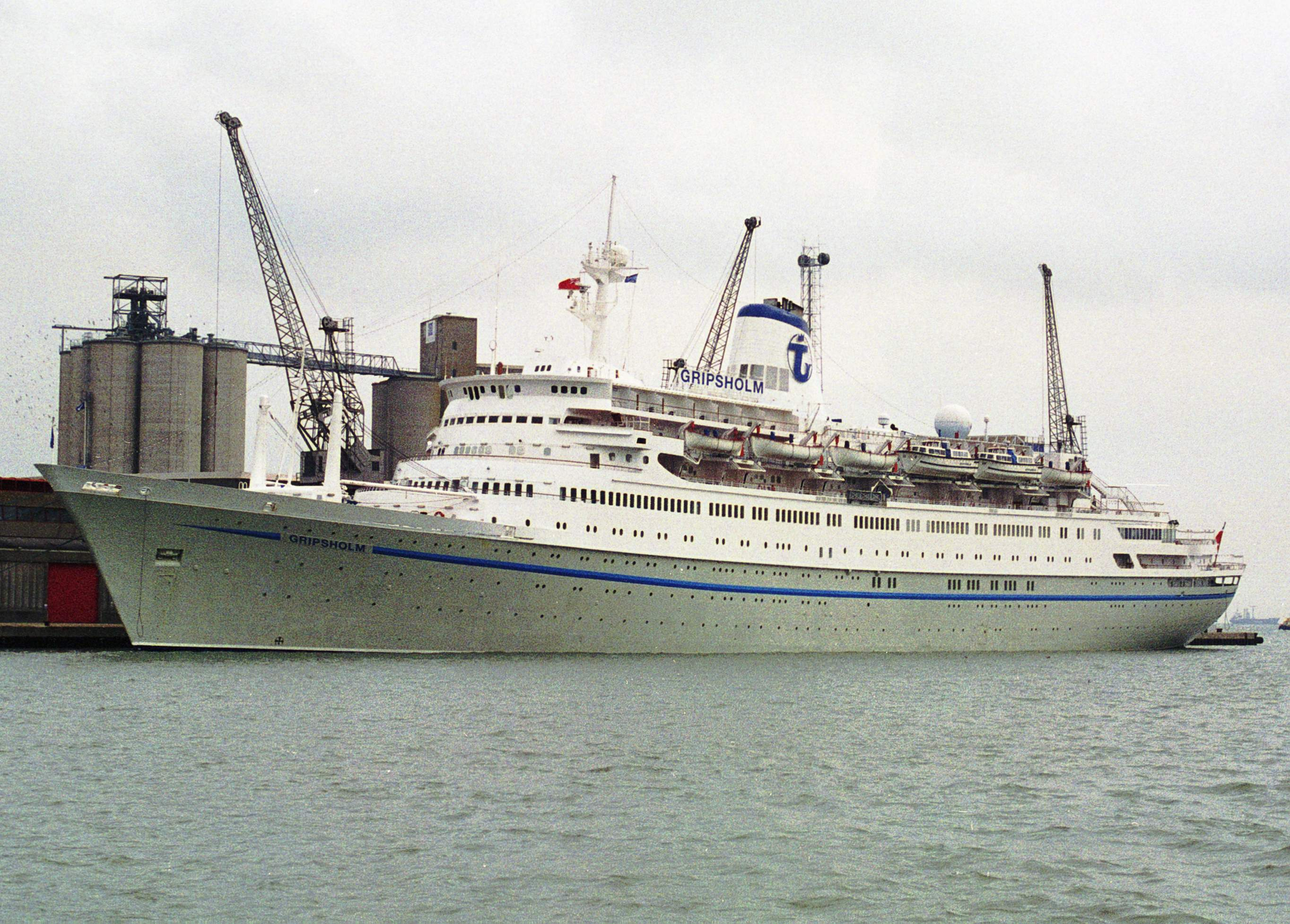
Gripsholm in Southampton, 1996

The Sagafjord undertook her maiden voyage from Oslo to New York City on 2 to 11 October 1965. At the time she was built to set the mark of luxury. She sailed with Norwegian America Line until 1980. Cruise services operated a loss in the late 1970s and were restructured with the two cruise ships Sagafjord and Vistafjord passing to a new company, Norwegian America Cruises, in 1980. The two ships were sold in 1983. The company was taken over by Cunard with the ship renamed Cunarder. Sagafjord was awarded a 5 Stars Plus rating by the Berlitz Cruise Guide and consistently voted amongst the 10 best cruise ships in the world until the early 1990s.

In 1996–97 the Sagafjord was chartered to Transocean Tours as part of a six-month deal. While in service with Transocean Tours she was renamed Gripsholm. During this time, she damaged a screw after grounding not far from Copenhagen. She was sold to Saga Cruises in 1997 and renamed Saga Rose. The ship was refurbished prior to entering service with her new owners. On 29 July 1999, she collided with the Norwegian fishing vessel Havbas, which sank 6 nautical miles (11 km) off Bremangerlandet. Her ten crew were rescued.

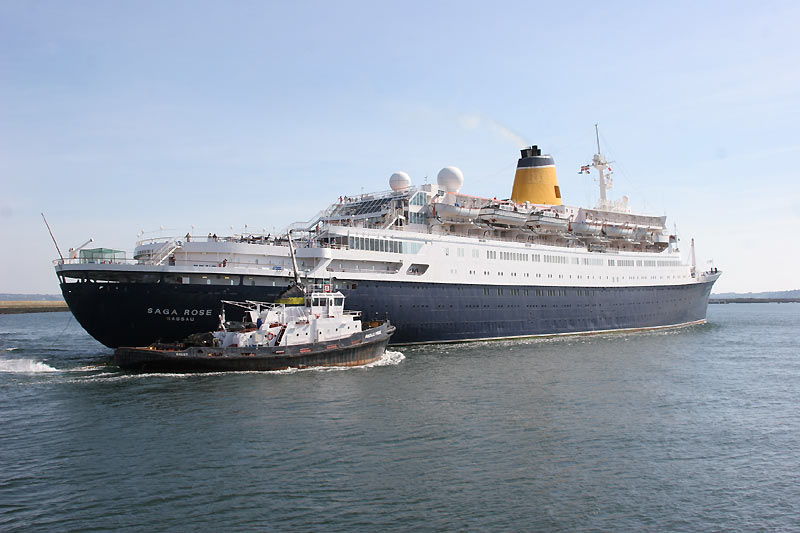
Saga Rose leaving Brest, France

On 11 June 2008, during a visit to Southampton, the second bosun died after entering a ballast tank which had a reduced oxygen atmosphere due to corrosion.

The Saga Rose was retired from service in October 2009 due to her not fulfilling the requirements of the new SOLAS 2010 regulations and was left with an uncertain future.

On 21 February 2010 Saga Rose was reported as setting out from Gibraltar, where she had been laid up since her final cruise with Saga Cruises, with her destination listed as Kenya. Rumours circulated about a possible sale for use as an accommodation ship. The stories proved false, as the ship was merely repositioned to a new anchorage and remained in Gibraltar.

In early April, Saga Rose finally put to sea, with Port Elizabeth, South Africa, listed as her destination. Once again, rumours of a conversion to a hotel ship circulated. On 29 April, Saga Rose docked in Durban for refuelling, and was under-way again with her destination now reported to be Maputo, Mozambique. Rather than dock again in Africa, Saga Rose next headed into the Indian Ocean, with Saga Cruises refusing to comment on the ship's possible sale for scrap or any other use. By 23 May, the ship was off the Taiwanese coast with her destination being reported as Japan.

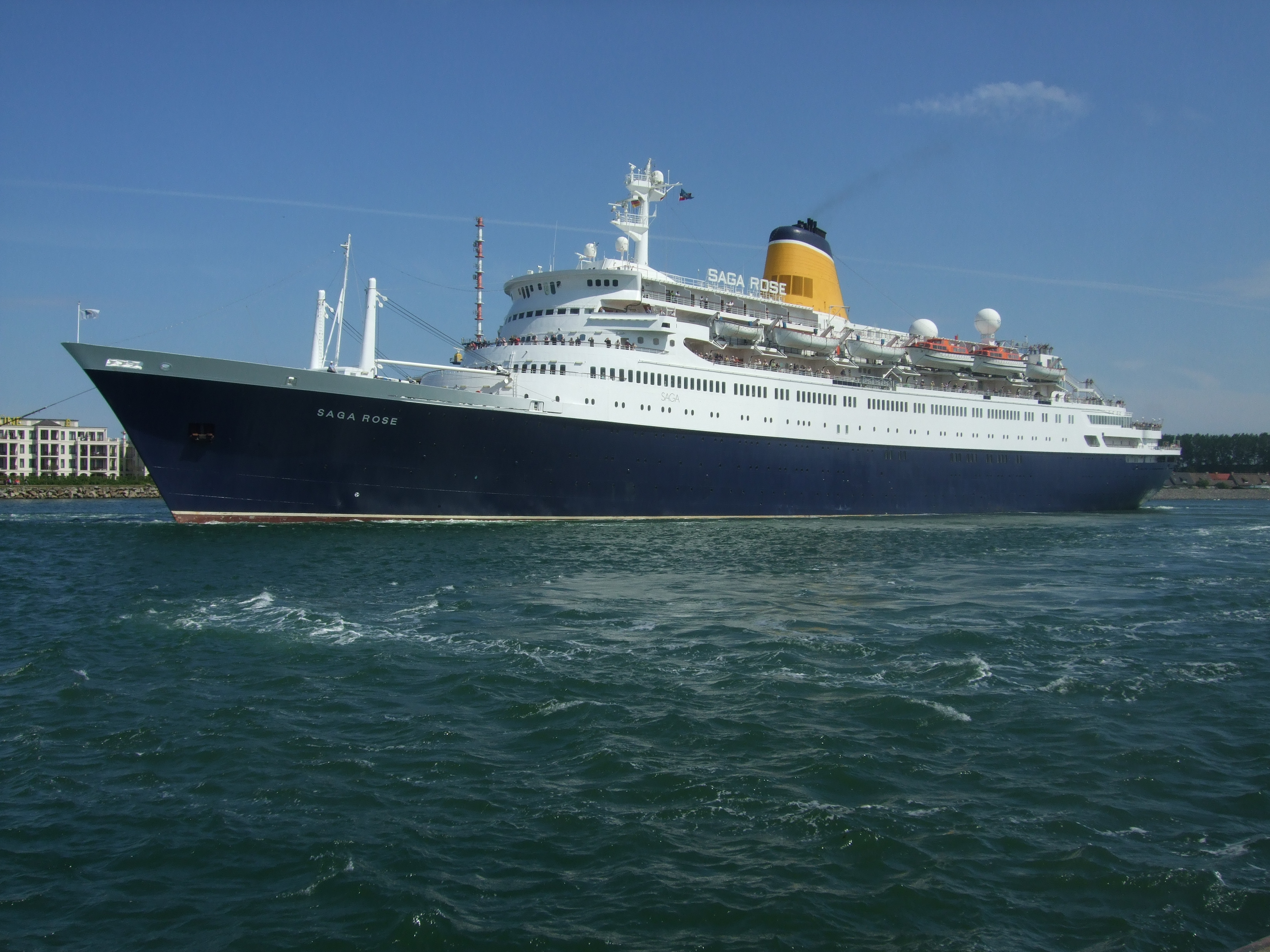
Saga Rose in Warnemünde on 30 May 2009

On 27 May, Saga Rose reached the harbour of Shanghai, China. After a few days at anchor, she continued further inland up the Yangtze River, docking in the Jiangyin district on 29 May, seemingly confirming speculation that the ship had been sold for scrap, as Jiangyin is home to the Changjiang Ship Recycling Yard, China's largest ship dismantling facility.

The Saga Rose currently holds the record for the most world cruises ever completed by a ship with 44 altogether, of which most were achieved under her original name Sagafjord, even surpassing the Queen Elizabeth 2.

== In popular culture ==
In Armistead Maupin's Further Tales of the City, two groups of characters escape from San Francisco by taking the same cruise with the Sagafjord to Alaska.
