= Henriksen =

Origin
- Origin: North Germanic
- Meaning: Son of Henrik
- Region of origin: Scandinavia

Other names
- Variant forms: Henricksen, Henrichsen

Henriksen is a Scandinavian patronymic surname, meaning son of Henrik.

== Notable people ==
- Arve Henriksen (born 1968), Norwegian trumpet player
- Bjarne Henriksen (born 1959), Danish actor
- Bjarne Henry Henriksen (1904–1995), Norwegian politician
- Bruce Henricksen (born 1941) American author and academic
- Bo Henriksen (born 1975), Danish footballer
- Clifford A. Henricksen, (born 1943), American inventor
- Eivind Henriksen (born 1990), Norwegian hammer thrower
- Gustav Henriksen (1872–1939), Norwegian businessperson
- Hans Christian Henriksen (1909–1983), Norwegian businessperson
- Henriette Henriksen (born 1970), Norwegian team handball player and Olympic medalist
- Jesper Henriksen (c. 1425 – before 1493), Danish noble
- Johan R. Henriksen (1886–1975), Norwegian Nordic skier
- Kai G. Henriksen (1956–2016), Norwegian businessperson, politician, Vinmonopolet CEO
- Kari Henriksen (born 1955), Norwegian politician
- Kim J. Henriksen (born 1960), Danish Esperantist
- Kjell Henriksen (1938–1996), Norwegian physicist
- Kristian Henriksen (1911–2004), Norwegian footballer and coach
- Lance Henriksen (born 1940), American actor
- Leonardo Henrichsen (1940–1973), Argentine and Swedish photojournalist
- Markus Henriksen (born 1992), Norwegian footballer
- Olaf Henriksen (1888–1962), Danish baseball player
- Ole Henriksen (born 1951), Danish skin specialist
- Per Rune Henriksen (born 1960), Norwegian politician
- Peter Henriksen (born 1972), Danish team handball player
- Rein Henriksen (1915–1994), Norwegian lawyer and industrialist
- René Henriksen (born 1969), Danish footballer
- Soren Henriksen (born 1964), Danish cricketer
- Sophus Henrichsen (1845–1928), Norwegian physicist
- Tony Henriksen (born 1973), Danish football goalkeeper
- Tor Arne Lau Henriksen, Norwegian military officer
- Trond Henriksen (born 1964), Norwegian footballer
- Vera Henriksen (1927–2016), Norwegian author

== See also ==
- Henriksson
- Hinrichsen
