= Bergensfjord (ship) =

Bergensfjord is the name of several ships:

- SS Bergensfjord, a Norwegian America Line ocean liner, 1913–1946
- MS Bergensfjord (1955), a Norwegian America Line ocean liner, 1955–1971
- MS Bergensfjord (1993), a passenger ferry renamed Oslofjord
- MF Bergensfjord (2006), a passenger ferry operated by Fjord1 between Mortavika and Arsvågen in Norway (Norwegian article)
- MS Bergensfjord (2013), a passenger ferry operated by Fjord Line
