= Oslofjord (disambiguation) =

Oslofjord is the fjord leading up to Oslo, Norway.

Oslofjord may also refer to:

- Any of several ships operated by the Norwegian America Line:
  - SS Oslofjord, a ship used by the Norwegian America Line, 1923–1930
  - MS Oslofjord (1937), an ocean liner operated by the Norwegian America Line, 1938–1940
  - MS Oslofjord (1949), a combined ocean liner/cruise ship operated by the Norwegian America Line, 1949–1967
- MS Oslofjord (1993), a passenger ferry operated by Fjord Line
- Oslofjord Convention Center, situated in Stokke Kommune
