= Kjeld Stub Irgens =

Norwegian politician (1879–1963)

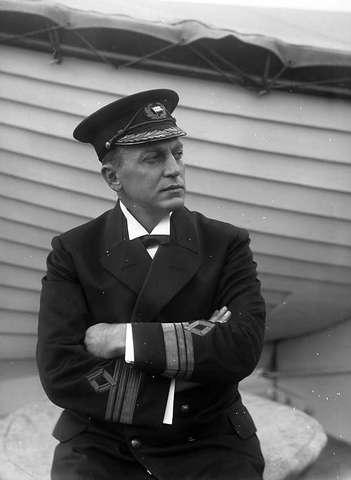
- Captain Irgens on board Stavangerfjord.

Provisional Minister of Shipping
- In office 25 September 1940 – 25 September 1941

Minister of Shipping
- In office 25 September 1941 – 31 January 1942

NS Minister of Shipping
- In office 1 February 1942 – 12 June 1944

Personal details
- Born: 23 May 1879
- Died: 26 August 1963 (aged 84)
- Party: Nasjonal Samling
- Relations: Albert Viljam Hagelin (brother-in-law)
- Profession: Naval officer Sea captain

Kjeld Stub Irgens (23 May 1879 – 26 August 1963) was a Norwegian politician during the German occupation of Norway.

== Early life ==
He was born in 1879 to vicar Jens Stub Irgens and his wife Sophie Cathinka, née Altschwager. He had several brothers and sisters. He was a distant relative of eighteenth-century bishop Ole Irgens and politicians Ole and Johannes Irgens.

== Seafaring career ==
A sea captain by profession, Irgens had received his education in the Royal Norwegian Navy, which he left with the rank of First Lieutenant (Norwegian: Premierløytnant) in 1903. From 1913 onwards Irgens worked for the Norwegian America Line (NAL) shipping company, in 1918 assuming command of the NAL's 12,977 GRT passenger ship SS Stavangerfjord. In 1921 Irgens purchased the island of Ravnøy in Vestfold on behalf of the crew of Stavangerfjord, as a holiday resort at which to spend time with their families after spending long periods of time at sea. The 270-decare property, located between the island of Nøtterøy and Stokke on the mainland, was bought at a price of 10,000 Norwegian kroner and later transferred to the Norwegian America Line. The shipping company remained in ownership of the island until 1983 when it was sold on to the Holiday Resort Ravnøy Foundation (Norwegian: Stiftelsen Feriestedet Ravnøy).

== World War II ==
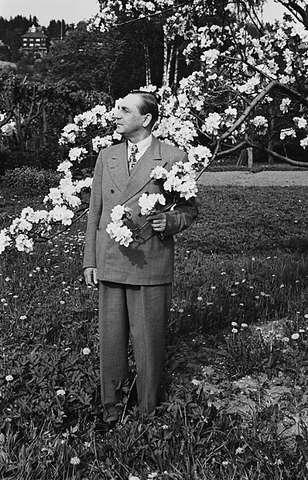
Irgens in 1939.

=== Negotiations during the German invasion ===
He was not involved with the Norwegian Nazi party, Nasjonal Samling, before the Second World War reached Norway in 1940. However, he was married to a sister of Albert Viljam Hagelin, a leading member of Nasjonal Samling, and one day after the German invasion he was summoned by Hagelin and Vidkun Quisling to Hagelin's suite at the Hotel Continental in Oslo. Here, he was asked to persuade King Haakon VII to abdicate and to name Quisling as Prime Minister. Together with Curt Bräuer he traveled to Elverum to negotiate, but his efforts proved fruitless. On his way to Elverum Irgens encountered some members of the Storting at Hamar Station, stating his intention to meet with the King. Irgens arrived at Elverum late in the evening of 10 April, being allowed to sleep in Minister Hjelmtveit's bed for a few hours before seeing the King the next morning. The meeting led nowhere, as the final Norwegian decision to resist the invasion had already been taken the previous day. The Norwegian government refused Quisling's demands and vowed to resist the German invasion as long as possible.

=== Collaborationist minister ===
When Reichskommissar Josef Terboven formed a cabinet on 25 September 1940, Irgens accepted the position as provisional Minister of Shipping. The Ministry of Shipping was a government ministry established specifically for Irgens on the insistence of Terboven, as Irgens was considered close to Haakon VII. Because of Irgens' relations with the exiled Norwegian king Terboven strongly wished to include him in his administration. At the same time he enrolled as a party member of Nasjonal Samling. From the beginning of Irgens' work at the Ministry of Shipping he successfully defended the part of the Norwegian merchant fleet left in the occupied country against German attempts at taking the ships as prizes. As of September 1941 his position was no longer provisional. On 1 February 1942 Quisling was allowed by the occupants to form his own cabinet; Irgens continued as Minister of Shipping. He was removed on 12 June 1944 together with Eivind Blehr for emphasizing Norwegian nationalism rather than Pan-Germanic national socialism. Irgens had also come under criticism for hesitating to accept members of Nasjonal Samling joining his ministry. At the same time the Ministry of Shipping ceased to exist.

== Post-World War II ==
As part of the legal purge in Norway after the war, in 1945, Irgens was sentenced to seven years of forced labour. The case was taken to the Supreme Court in 1946, where the sentence was increased to fifteen years. He died in 1963.

== Bibliography ==
- Bjørnsen, Bjørn (1977). Det utrolige døgnet (in Norwegian). Oslo: Gyldendal Norsk Forlag. ISBN 82-05-10553-7.
