= MS Stavangerfjord =

Two motor ships have borne the name Stavangerfjord:

- MS Stavangerfjord (2006) is a 4,856-ton roll-on/roll-off ferry completed in January 2007, by Aker Tulcea, Tulcea, Romania.
- MS Stavangerfjord (2013) is a 25,000-ton cruisefery completed in July 2013, Bergen Group Fosen, Rissa Municipality, Norway.

== Steamship ==
- SS Stavangerfjord (1918) was an ocean liner of the Norwegian America Line (1918–1964). Fuel was first coal, later oil.
