= Newcastle–Bergen–Stavanger ferry =

Former ferry route

The United Kingdom to Norway ferry service was a route connecting Newcastle in England with Stavanger, Bergen, and Haugesund in Norway. It existed for over 140 years until 2008, when it was last operated by DFDS Seaways. Since its closure there have been various campaigns, local petitions, and attempts by companies to relaunch the service. As of February 2026 no new line is planned.

== History ==
In the late 1800s services operated between Manchester, Liverpool and Copenhagen. In 1890 Bergen Line opened a new connection between the UK and Norway, with several voyages a week until World War II; then both of the ferries were sunk. In 1945 service was restored when one was refloated with salvaged engines from the other. Over the years three additional ferries were added, sailing between Newcastle and Bergen and Stavanger. The Bergen Steamship Company continued this service until 1974.

In 1978 MS Winston Churchill started operating a twice-weekly sailing from Newcastle to Gothenburg, Sweden. In 1981 a route from Newcastle to Oslo began, operated by MS England. By 1994, MS King of Scandinavia was purchased by the company Color Line, renamed MS Color Viking, and entered service between Newcastle, Stavanger, Bergen and Haugesund. After several years the company sold the Norway-to-UK route along with the vessel to Norwegian ferry operator Fjord Line.

In 1998 Fjord Line renamed the vessel MS Jupiter. Elsewhere on the North Sea network, two existing DFDS services were merged: the Harwich–Gothenburg route and the Newcastle–Gothenburg route. The combined new route was a single passage from Gothenburg to Newcastle via Kristiansand, Norway.

For a number of years Fjord Line continued to successfully operate the Newcastle to Norway ferry route.

In September 2006 DFDS purchased MS Fjord Norway from Fjord Line. This move allowed the company to own two sister ships, MS Fjord Norway and MS King of Scandinavia. The addition to the fleet underwent a refurbishment and name change before being re-deployed between Stavanger, Haugesund, Bergen and Newcastle. Meanwhile, the company announced the closure of their Gothenburg to Kristiansand and Newcastle route on 1 November 2006; this allowed their existing asset MS Princess of Scandinavia to be sold off and pushed the market toward their new operating route.

In May 2007 MS Princess of Norway was relieved of the Newcastle, Stavanger, Haugesund and Bergen service, to be taken over by MS Queen of Scandinavia. This allowed DFDS to operate their vessel MS Princess of Norway with her sister ship MS King of Scandinavia on the Amsterdam to Newcastle service.

The service was operated by one passenger cruise ferry which offered overnight cabin accommodation, as well as automobile and freight transport. The ferry operated year-round across the North Sea and was usually an overnight sailing. In the summer the service was mostly tailored to the tourist market, and the timetable altered to include extra sailings where possible.

=== Route closure ===
On 1 September 2008 DFDS ended their United Kingdom to Norway service, citing the route as loss-making, with no ambition for a route relaunch in the future. MS Queen of Scandinavia made her final sailing on 18 September 2008.

The termination led to 350 job losses, including 270 on MS Queen of Scandinavia and a further 70 employees in the UK, Denmark and Norway. It was estimated that the economy of North East England would suffer a £10 million annual loss as a result.

Prior to the route's closure, the director of tourism for Bergen, Norway stated that "The British market has been the biggest for us for the last five or six years, with about 200,000 visitors every summer."

== Campaign for reinstatement ==
Since the closure of the route there have been several campaigns launched to reinstate the service.

Locals in the UK started a campaign and website in 2008 (www.britain2norway.com) to highlight the demand, impact and need for the reinstatement of a ferry line. Upon the start-up of Norwegian Seaways Ltd a new website was created, www.StartaUKtoNorwayferry.com. The site featured an e-petition for those still affected by the loss of the route, and opportunities for public views to be stated. It also featured history, links, news and updates on efforts to reinstate the service.

The leader of Newcastle council confirmed in January 2026 that they were still actively looking into ways to reinstate the service, but noted that operators did not consider the route to be economically viable at that time. Reintroducing the ferry route may now also require the construction of new, larger border control facilities at Bergen.

== Attempted start-ups ==
Norwegian Seaways was initially founded to try to relaunch the service, which soon evolved into Norwegian Seaways 2 Ltd. The two companies went dormant and in 2014 the same owners formed a new project called Project Norse, which in 2015 evolved into British Scandinavian Ltd. Several investments from the public sector were made into the start-up, but to date a route between the UK and Norway still does not exist. In September 2015 it was reported that the company was in a long process of negotiation, with the company's CEO travelling to Athens, Greece to discuss reinstating the service. British Scandinavian has since dissolved.

In 2022 Bergen Cruise Line announced plans to introduce a ferry service between Newcastle, Stavanger and Bergen from 2026. However, as of August 2026, no line opening is planned.
