= SS Kristianiafjord =

SS Kristianiafjord is the name of the following ships:

- SS Kristianiafjord (1912), ran aground in 1917 with no loss of life
- SS Kristianiafjord (1920)
