= Einar Westye Egeberg Jr. =

Norwegian businessman

Einar Westye Egeberg Jr. (24 February 1883 – 1946) was a Norwegian businessperson.

He was born in Kristiania. After middle school he attended the Öffentlichen Handelslehranstalt in Leipzig from 1899 to 1902. He worked with timber trade in London from 1902 to 1904 and studied languages in France from 1906 to 1907. In 1911 he became a manager and co-owner in the family company Westye Egeberg & Co. The company was founded by Westye Egeberg (1770–1830) in 1802, and had been passed down through the generations. Egeberg also took over the estates Stormo and Tannæs in Nord-Odal Municipality in 1930. His interests were skiing and hunting. He was a member of the gentlemen's club SK Fram from 1912 to 1942.

He died in 1946, and was buried at Vestre gravlund. His daughter Agnes Cecilie Egeberg, whom he had together with Kitty Parr (1892–1970), married cruise line director Hans Christian Henriksen.
