= SS Trondhjemsfjord =

SS Trondhjemsfjord is the name of the following ships:

- SS Trondhjemsfjord (1911), sunk 28 July 1915 by SM U-41
- SS Trondhjemsfjord (1921), sunk 27 April 1943 by Allied aircraft
