= MS Bergensfjord (1955) =

Ocean liner

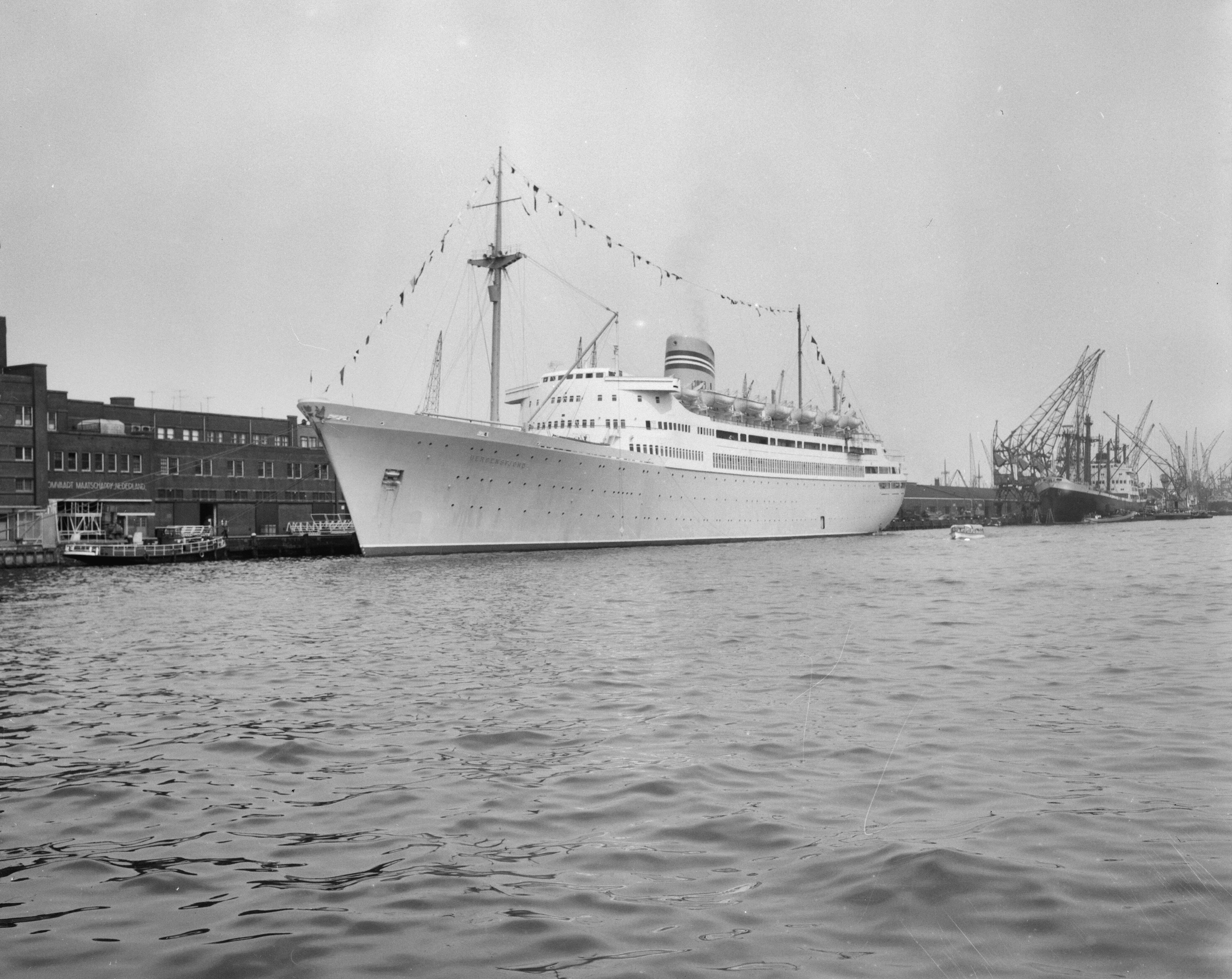
- Bergensfjord in the Port of Amsterdam

History
- Name: Bergensfjord (1956-71); De Grasse (1971-73); Rasa Sayang (1973-78, 1980); Golden Moon (1980)
- Operator: Norwegian America Line (1956-71); Compagnie Générale Transatlantique (1971-73); horeson & Company and Bruusgaard Kiosterud & Co (1973-78); Sunlit Cruises (1978-1980); Aphrodite Maritime Co (1980)
- Port of registry: Oslo
- Builder: Swan, Hunter & Wigham Richardson Ltd
- Yard number: 1849
- Launched: 18 July 1955
- Completed: May 1956
- In service: 1956
- Fate: Burned and sunk, 1980

General characteristics
- Tonnage: 18.739 GRT
- Length: 176.26 m (578 ft 3 in)
- Beam: 22 m (72 ft 2 in)
- Draught: 8.41 m (27 ft 7 in)
- Installed power: 2 x Oil engines, 2SCDA, 8cyl (720 x 1100mm)
- Speed: 23,5 Knots (44 km/h)
- Capacity: 878 passengers, 126 First Class, 752 Tourist Class

MS Bergensfjord was an ocean liner built in 1955 by Swan, Hunter & Wigham Richardson Ltd, for Norwegian America Line. She was 18,739 gross register tons, and could carry 878 passengers. She would have a uneventful career with her original owners until she was sold to the Compagnie Générale Transatlantique in 1971, then to the horeson & Company and Bruusgaard Kiosterud & Co, before she was sold to the Aphrodite Maritime Co. She was sunk in 1980 after a fire broke out on board.

== Career ==
=== Early years ===
In 1954, Norwegian America Line placed an order with Swan Hunter shipyard in Wallsend-on-Tyne, England for a new liner that would be an updated and improved version of MS Oslofjord. The ship had a longer aft superstructure than the Oslofjord for more passenger space, featured air conditioning throughout her passenger and crew area, and private bathrooms which were not common for ships of the time. She was also designed for easy conversion to a single-class ship with cruising duties in mind. She had accommodations for 878 passengers but only 360 in cruising service. The ship measured 18,739 gross tons, was 176.26 m (578.3 ft) long, and has two 2SCDA 8cyl Oil engines which drove her at a top speed of 23.5 kn (43.5 km/h; 27.0 mph). The new ship was launched as intended in 1955 and was delivered to the line in May of 1956, setting out on her maiden voyage from Oslo to New York route on 31 May, arriving in New York harbor on 9 June. From 1956-1971, Bergensfjord operated transatlantic crossings during the warmer months, with cruises during the winter. But as airline competition increased during the 1960s and ocean liners became less profitable, the company decided to put Bergensfjord up for sale.

=== Later years ===
She was sold to the Compagnie Generale Transatlantique in 1971 and renamed De Grasse, as a replacement for their ship Antilles servicing the Caribbean route. Unfortunately she was not as successful as her new owners expected and so the ship was retired and placed up for sale in 1973. She was sold to the Singapore-based Rasa Sayang Cruises and joint venture of Norwegian shipping forms Thoreson & Company and Bruusgaard Kiosterud & Co. She was renamed Rasa Sayang and she was then utilized for long-distance cruises including around-the-world trips. On 1977, A fire broke out out of Dickson, but everyone evacuate except 3 workers. 1 died and 2 went missing. Unfortunately, her career came to an end and she was laid up. She was sold to Cypriot-based Sunlit Cruises and renamed Golden Moon. She was then sold to the Aphrodite Maritime Co.

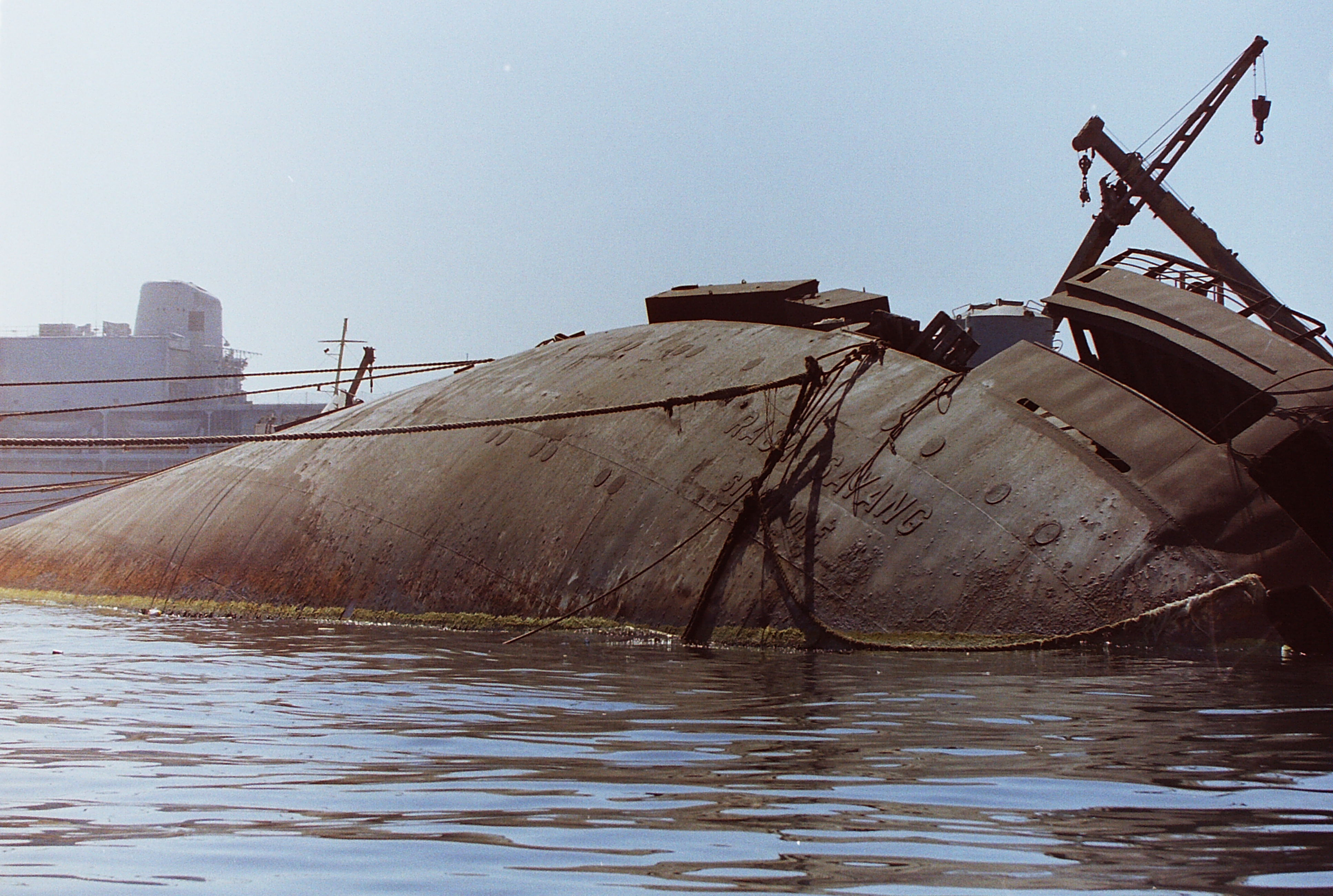
The wreck of the cruise ship Rasa Sayang

==== Fate ====
On 27 August 1980 disaster struck. During her reconstruction, a fire broke out on board. It spread very rapidly, quickly consuming the ageing liner, and overnight she rolled over to starboard, coming to rest on the bottom of the shallow harbour. Her wreck still remains at that position at 37°56′51.8″N 23°33′57.5″E. In the early 2000s, the funnel, superstructure, and masts were cut up for scrap, but the partially submerged hull remains in place, now used as a protective breakwater and mooring wharf by a dredging company.
