= SS Stavangerfjord (1918) =

Norwegian passenger liner

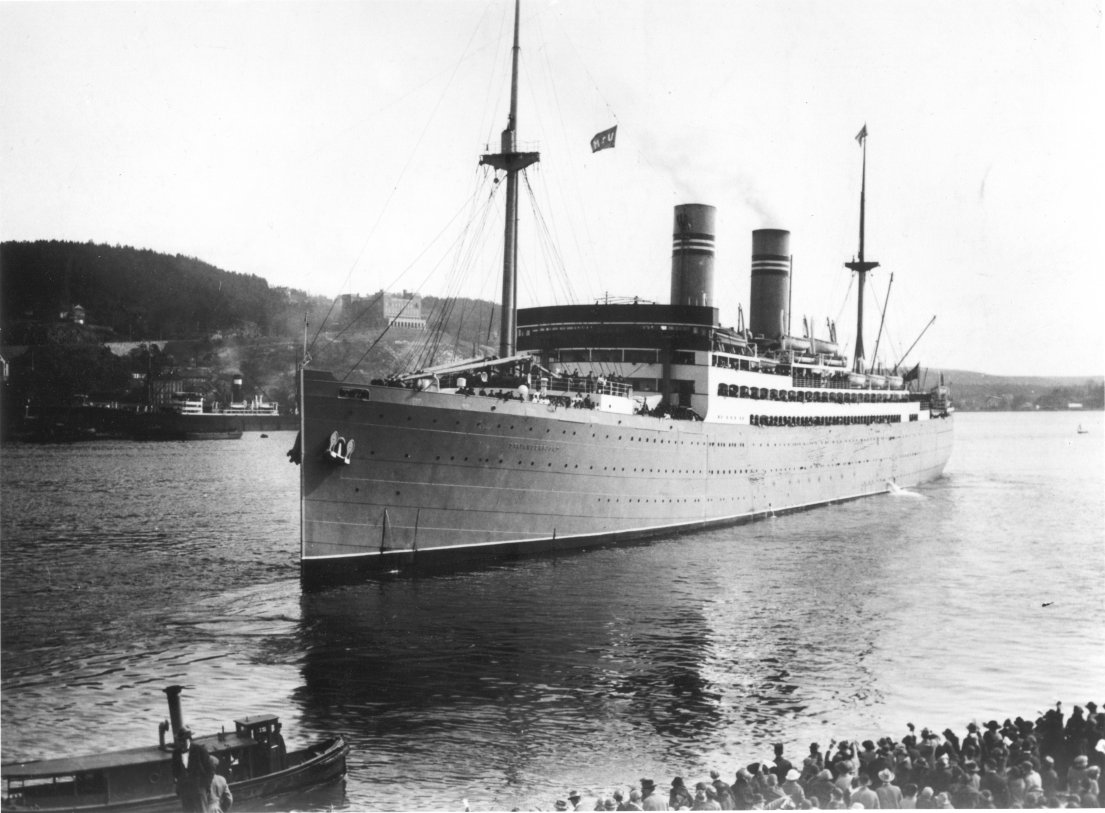
- Arrival in Oslo around 1920

History

Norway
- Name: SS Stavangerfjord
- Owner: Norwegian America Line
- Port of registry: Stavanger Norway
- Route: Route 1:Kristiania/Oslo – Kristiansand – Stavanger – Bergen – New York; Route 2:Oslo – Halifax
- Builder: Cammell Laird in Birkenhead
- Yard number: 821
- Launched: 22 May 1918
- Acquired: April 1918
- Maiden voyage: 21 September 1918
- Fate: Scrapped 1964 in Hong Kong by Patt, Manfield & Co. Ltd

General characteristics
- Type: Ocean liner
- Tonnage: 12,997 gross tons
- Length: 532.5 ft (162.3 m)
- Beam: 64.2 ft (19.6 m)
- Draft: 29.3 ft (8.9 m)
- Installed power: Quadruple expansion engine with 8 cylinders of 26, 37 1/2, 53 & 75 inches diameter each pair; stroke 51 inches operating at 220 psi (1,500 kPa) The engine was built by the same company as the hull.; 1,575 nominal horsepower; 8 single ended boilers; 32 corrugated furnaces with a grate surface 590 sq. ft. and a heating surface 23,000 sq. ft forced draught.
- Speed: 15 knots
- Capacity: 1,236 passengers; 88 first class; 318 second class; 830 third class

SS Stavangerfjord was a Norwegian passenger ocean liner that sailed for the Norwegian America Line between Norway and the United States and sailed periodically to Canada. She was the third ship of the Norwegian American Line, and similar to the company's first two ships. SS Stavangerfjord was built by Cammell Laird in Birkenhead, England. The ship was launched on 21 May 1917, and was put into service in April 1918. The ship sailed to New York and due to World War I, it did not arrive in Bergen until 21 September 1918. In 1924 her fuel was converted from coal to oil combustion.

The ship was seized by Nazi German occupiers in Oslo in 1940 and was used as a depot ship throughout World War II. After the war, the shipping company resumed the ship in transatlantic scheduled traffic between New York and several ports in Norway. The "Old Lady" faithfully crossed the Atlantic until 1964 when she was sold for scrapping.

== Important transatlantic connection ==
For more than four decades, the steamship Stavangerfjord sailed an important transatlantic route. SS Stavangerfjord was the shipping company's ship that sailed for the longest time on this route. The route was important for travelers between North America and Scandinavia, for the Norwegian-Americans in particular. An arrival of SS Stavangerfjord was an important event in the ports where the ship arrived, until the route lost in competition with the air traffic.

== See also ==
- SS Kristianiafjord (1912)
- SS Bergensfjord (1913)
- MS Sagafjord (1965)
- MS Stavangerfjord
