= Fjord Line =

Norwegian ferry operator

- Type: Ferry company
- Founded: 1993
- Headquarters: Egersund, Norway
- Area served: Norway, Denmark
- Services: Passenger transportation, Freight transportation
- Revenue: 1,550,000,000 Norwegian krone (2024)
- Number of employees: 245 (2010)
- Parent: Bergen Nordhordland Rutelag
- Website: fjordline.com

Fjord Line currently run on its route to Bergen

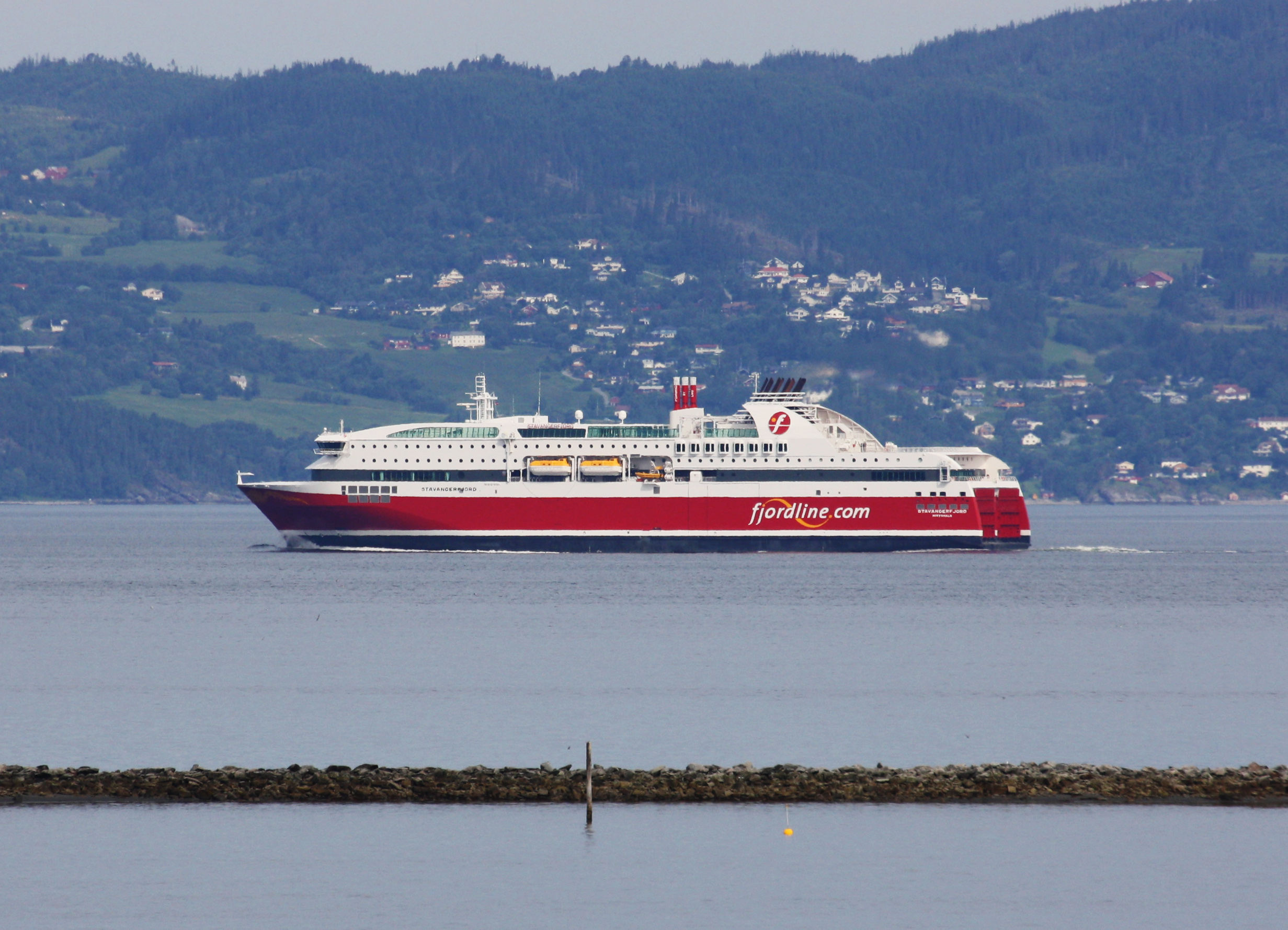
Stavangerfjord

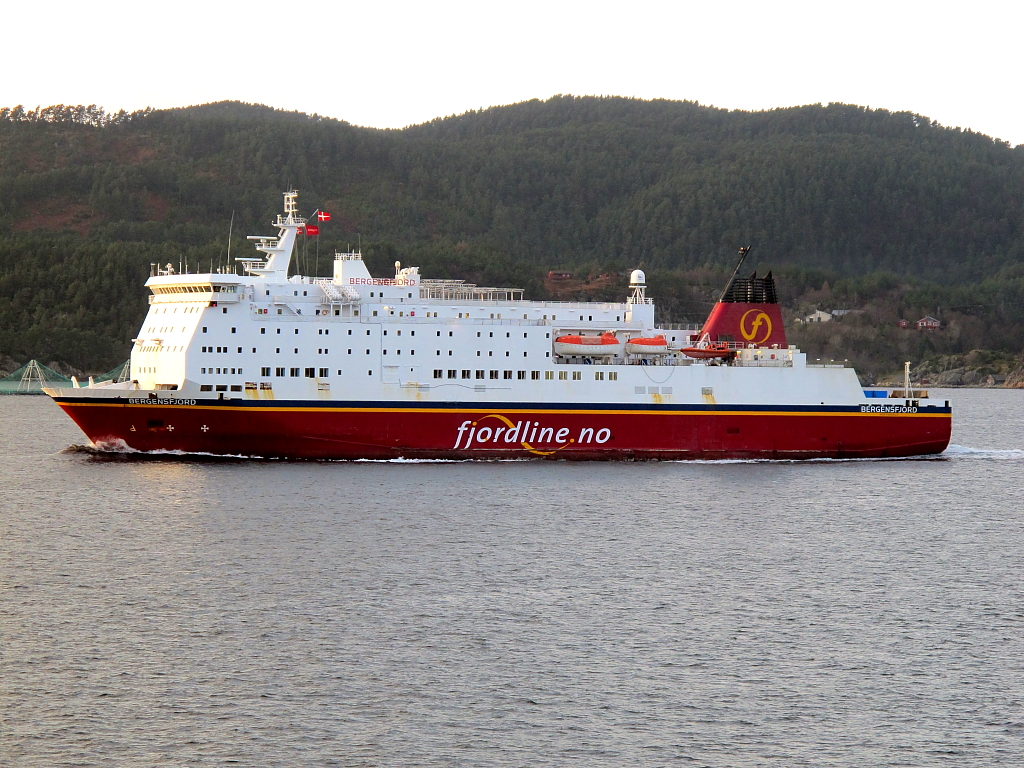
Old Bergensfjord (current Dalmacija(bought by Croatian company Jadrolinija))

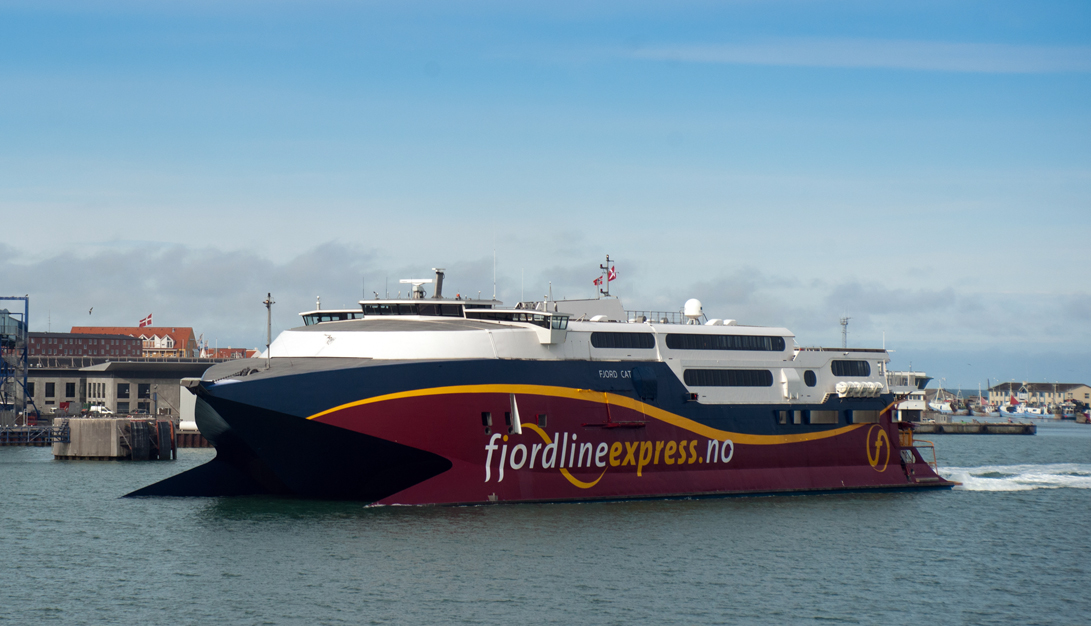
Fjord Cat

Fjord Line is a Norwegian ferry operator offering services between Norway and Denmark. In addition to passenger transport, Fjord Line also operates cargo transport through its cargo division in both Norway and Denmark.

== History ==
Fjord Line was founded in 1993. In 1998 the company purchased the MS Jupiter and the Bergen - Newcastle route from Color Line.

In 2004 a much larger ship, the MS Fjord Norway was purchased to operate the Norway - Denmark service. The MS Bergen was chartered to DFDS.

Following heavy competition on the Norway - Denmark route, in 2005 Fjord Line began streamlining operations. On return of the MS Bergen from charter, the MS Fjord Norway and the Norway - UK route were sold to DFDS. The MS Jupiter was laid up for sale. Paroms between Oslo and Newcastle, operated by Fjord Line, also ceased operations in 2006. The company was among those that tried to maintain the UK–Scandinavia route.

On 1 January 2008 Fjord Line merged with fast ferry operator Master Ferries.

The MS Stavangerfjord was awarded for Best Ship Design at the 2014 Shippax Awards.

In 2014 Fjord Line became the world's first ferry operator to use contactless radio frequency identification (RFID) smart cards for cabin locks. This solution was provided by Carus Ferry Ltd Ab.

In October 2020 the company announced a scale-back of operations whereby the ferry operations will only serve the ports of Kristiansand, Hirtshals, and Stavanger.

The Sandefjord - Strömstad route: Service [ended] on the 29th of October 2023)

== Routes ==
Fjord Line operates routes between Norway and Denmark.

- Bergen - Hirtshals (as of summer of 2025)
- Kristiansand - Hirtshals (Summer only) (Concurrency with Color Line)
- Stavanger - Bergen

== Fleet ==
=== Current fleet ===
Fjord Line currently operates three vessels.

Name	Built	Entered service	Tonnage	Note
Stavangerfjord	2013	2013	31,678 GT	Exclusively powered by Liquified Natural Gas.
Bergensfjord	2014	2014	31,678 GT	From January 2014. Sister of Stavangerfjord.
Fjord FSTR	2020/2021	March 2021	11,888 GT	A new ship for the Kristiansand - Hirtshals route. Previously used by Fjord Cat.

=== Past fleet ===
Name	Built	In service	Tonnage	Fate
Lygra	1979	1997–2006	7,012 GT	Operates between USA and Caribbean
Fjord Norway	1986	2003–2006	31,356 GT	Sold to DFDS as Princess of Norway
Jupiter	1975	1998–2005	12,348 GT	Operates as a cruise ship in Vietnam, It sank November 2017
Fjord Cat	1998	2008–2020	5,619 GT	
Oslofjord	1993/2014	1993/2014	16,551 GT	Formerly ran the Hirtshals/Bergen/Stavanger service and was converted into a day ferry in 2014 and renamed Oslofjord.
