= Henriksson =

Henriksson is a Swedish patronymic surname meaning "son of Henrik". There are other spelling variations of this surname such as Henrikson, Henricson and Hendrickson.

== Geographical distribution ==
As of 2014, 81.5% of all known bearers of the surname Henriksson were residents of Sweden, 14.1% of Finland and 1.2% of Norway.

In Sweden the frequency of the surname was higher than national average in the following counties:

1. Norrbotten (1:184)
2. Värmland (1:298)
3. Jämtland (1:310)
4. Västernorrland (1:377)
5. Blekinge (1:403)
6. Halland (1:479)
7. Örebro (1:496)
8. Kronoberg (1:498)
9. Kalmar (1:520)
10. Västra Götaland (1:566)

In Finland, the frequency of the surname was higher than national average in the following regions:

1. Åland (1:149)
2. Southwest Finland (1:748)
3. Uusimaa (1:1,167)
4. Ostrobothnia (1:1,609)

== People ==
Notable people with the surname include:

- Alf Henrikson (1905–1995), Swedish journalist, writer and poet
- Anna-Maja Henriksson (born 1964), Finnish politician
- C. Robert Henrikson (born 1947), American CEO of MetLife, Inc
- Daniel Henriksson (born 1978), Swedish ice hockey goaltender
- Janne Henriksson (born 1981), Finnish football goalkeeper
- Krister Henriksson (born 1946), Swedish actor
- Leif Henriksson (1943–2019), Swedish ice hockey player
- Martin Henriksson (born 1974), Swedish guitarist
- Robert Hendrickson, American director
- Robert C. Hendrickson (1898–1964), American Senator from New Jersey
- Sebastian Henriksson (born 1974), Swedish football player
- Stig Henriksson (born 1955), Swedish politician
- Sture Henriksson (1917–1957), Swedish politician
- Tord Henriksson (born 1965), Swedish triple jumper
- Waino Edward Hendrickson (1896–1983), American politician

== See also ==
- Henricksen
