= MS Stavangerfjord (2012) =

Ferry of Fjord Line

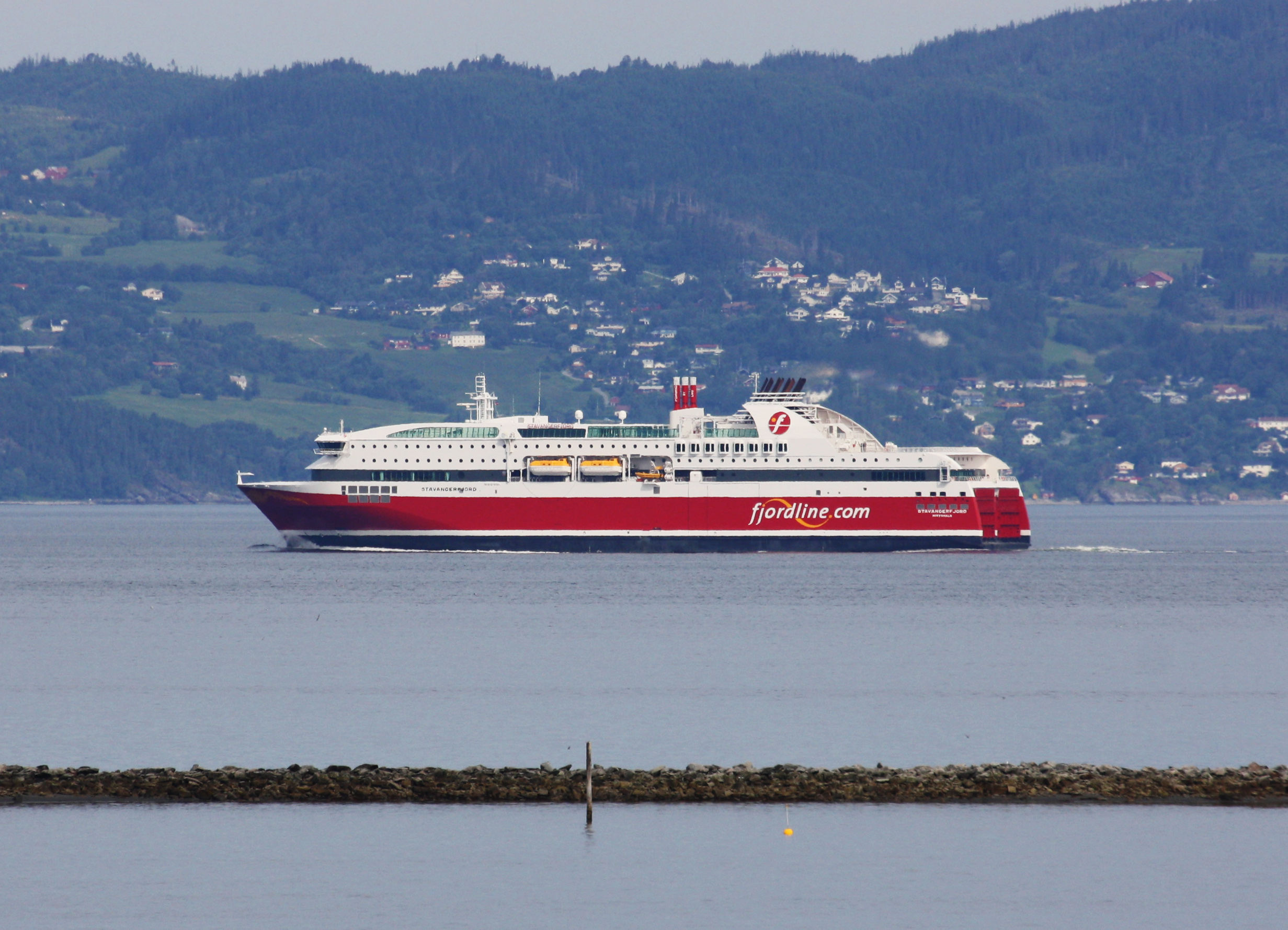
- MS Stavangerfjord

History
- Name: MS Stavangerfjord
- Operator: Fjord Line
- Builder: Stocznia Gdańsk, Bergen Group Fosen
- Yard number: 87
- Laid down: 23 March 2011
- Launched: 12 April 2012
- Acquired: 8 July 2013
- Out of service: January to May 2023
- Identification: Call sign OYOW2; IMO number: 9586605
- Status: In service

General characteristics
- Type: Cruiseferry
- Tonnage: 31,678 GT
- Length: 170 m (560 ft)
- Beam: 27.5 m (90 ft)
- Draught: 6.35 m (20.8 ft)
- Decks: 10
- Propulsion: LNG/MGO
- Speed: 21.5 knots (39.8 km/h; 24.7 mph)
- Capacity: 1,500 passengers, 600 vehicles.
- Crew: 70-100

MS Stavangerfjord is a Danish registered cruiseferry operated by Norwegian ferry operator Fjord Line. The vessel operates between Hirtshals, Stavanger, Bergen and Langesund. It is the first cruise ferry in the world powered exclusively by liquefied natural gas.

== History ==
Stavangerfjord commenced its maiden voyage on 14 July 2013.

On 25 July 2013, it was announced Fjord Line has revised parts of the timetable for Stavangerfjord, starting on the evening of the 25 July for the following five weeks to allow more time for refuelling with liquid natural gas while in port. Fjord Line worked on new systems for filling fuel, which caused delays.

On 2 January 2014 Fjord Line announced that they have been given authorisation from Norwegian authorities to bunker the LNG on board the ship whilst passengers were still on board. Due to this, Fjord-line no longer have to send LNG lorries to Hirtshals to do the bunkering in Denmark.

Along with its sister ship Bergensfjord, they were powered only by LNG from 2013 to 2022, when the 2021–2023 global energy crisis increased LNG price to uneconomic levels, and Fjord decided to replace the LNG-only engines with dual-fuel engines.

== Facilities ==
Stavangerfjord has 370 berths and can carry about 1500 passengers and 600 cars. It has four dining areas.
