= SS Trondhjemsfjord (1911) =

Cargo passenger steamship

History

United Kingdom; Norway
- Name: Cotswold Range (1911–1914); Trondhjemsfjord (1914–1915)
- Owner: Furness, Withy & Co (1911–1914); Den Norske Amerikalinje (1914–1915)
- Operator: Neptune Steam Navigation Company (1911–1914); Den Norske Amerikalinje (1914–1915)
- Builder: Northumberland Shipbuilding Co, Howdon
- Yard number: 185
- Launched: 21 December 1911
- Commissioned: 5 March 1912
- Home port: West Hartlepool (1911–1914); Kristiania (1914–1915)
- Identification: UK Official Number 132815; Call sign HVLC (1911–1914); Call sign WKDC (1914–1915)
- Fate: Sunk, 28 July 1915

General characteristics
- Type: Cargo Passenger Ship
- Tonnage: 4,248 GRT; 2,737 NRT; 7,500 DWT
- Length: 380 ft 0 in (115.82 m)
- Beam: 49 ft 0 in (14.94 m)
- Depth: 26 ft 4 in (8.03 m)
- Installed power: 367 Nhp
- Propulsion: North Eastern Marine Engineering Co 3-cylinder triple expansion
- Speed: 10.0 knots

Trondhjemsfjord was a cargo passenger steamship built in 1911 by the Northumberland Shipbuilding Co of Newcastle for Furness, Withy & Co of West Hartlepool. The ship was sold shortly thereafter to the Norwegian America Line to run on their route between Norway and the United States.

== Design and construction ==
The vessel was laid down at Northumberland Shipbuilding Co. shipyard in Howdon and launched on 21 December 1911 (yard number 185) as Cotswold Range. After successful completion of sea trials on 5 March 1912, during which the vessel was able to attain speed of 11.75 knots (13.52 mph; 21.76 km/h), she was delivered on the same day to her owners, Furness, Withy & Co. Upon acceptance, the ship was assigned to the Neptune Steam Navigation Company of Sunderland to operate on Europe-USA route. The vessel was primarily intended for general cargo trade, and 9 steam winches, and large number of cargo derricks were installed to facilitate quick cargo loading and unloading process. In addition, accommodations for a large number of first and second-class passengers in steel houses on the bridge deck were built.

As built, the ship was 380 feet 0 inches (115.82 m) long (between perpendiculars) and 49 feet 0 inches (14.94 m) abeam, a mean draft of 26 feet 4 inches (8.03 m). Cotswold Range was assessed at 4,248 GRT and 2,737 NRT and had deadweight of approximately 7,500. The vessel had a steel hull, and a single 367 nhp triple-expansion steam engine, with cylinders of 25-inch (64 cm), 41-inch (100 cm) and 69-inch (180 cm) diameter with a 48-inch (120 cm) stroke, that drove a single screw propeller, and moved the ship at up to 10.0 knots (11.5 mph; 18.5 km/h).

== Operational history ==
=== In British registry ===
Upon delivery Cotswold Range immediately sailed to Fowey arriving there on 7 March. Upon loading China clay she left Fowey for her maiden journey on 24 March 1912 and arrived at Philadelphia on 10 April. The vessel was then chartered for one trip to the Southeast Asia and left Philadelphia on 15 May for Philippines. After a long journey the ship arrived in Manila on 12 July and from there proceeded to Iloilo on 3 August. Cotswold Range was subsequently chartered to bring sugar from Java to Australia and arrived for loading in Surabaya on 21 August. After loading 7,000 tons of sugar the ship sailed to Australia and arrived in Adelaide on 16 September where she discharged approximately 1,200 tons of her cargo. The vessel then sailed to Melbourne where she unloaded the remaining cargo, continued to Newcastle to load 6,250 tons of coal and departed on 10 October to Surabaya and Manila. The steamer returned to Australia to load a cargo of wool and timber at Bunbury on 30 November, continued to Albany to take on a cargo of wool and refill her bunkers before departing for UK and Europe on 17 December and arrived at London on 12 February 1913.

Upon arrival in England, Cotswold Range was chartered for New York-China trip and left Fowey on 18 March with a cargo of China clay and reached Philadelphia on 8 April. The ship left New York on 23 May, transited through the Suez Canal on 17 June, called at Sabang and finally arrived at Amoy on 25 July. From Amoy the ship sailed to Foochow and Swatow and continued for loading to Haiphong arriving there on 23 August. From Haiphong she sailed to the French ports of Le Havre and Rouen via Sabang and Colombo and arrived at Rouen on 26 October.

Following two round-the-world trips, Cotswold Range was put on the Rotterdam-New York route. The steamer arrived in Rotterdam on 14 November, loaded her cargo, including 18,253 bags of potatoes, and departed for North America on 22 November, reaching New York City on 10 December. From New York the vessel proceeded to New Orleans for cargo loading and arrived in port on 23 December. Upon loading her cargo, including 18,453 sacks of linseed cake and lumber, Cotswold Range left for Rotterdam via Port Arthur and reached it on 30 January 1914.

For her next journey the ship sailed from Rotterdam on 11 February arriving at Boston on 5 March. The ship encountered some rough weather on her way, coming into port five days late, and in addition, one sailor was killed and six other injured on 26 February, when a giant wave swept over the vessel during gale knocking the man down and breaking his neck. The ship took on board 56,264 bushels of wheat and sailed for Philadelphia on 10 March. She departed Philadelphia on 16 March and safely reached Rotterdam on 1 April.

Subsequently, the ship was moved to UK-US-Montreal-UK route, with the ship carrying China clay to the US ports, and returning to England from Montreal with general cargo and wheat. During her first trip on the new route, Cotswold Range brought 5,270 tons of China clay to Boston from Fowey on 9 May and subsequently sailed to Montreal in ballast arriving there on 23 May. The ship sailed from Montreal on 27 May with general cargo bound for Hull.

On the next trip the vessel arrived in New York on 24 July, however, four days later Austria-Hungary declared war on Serbia starting World War I which made sailing more dangerous. Cotswold Range arrived at Montreal on 13 August and after loading cargo of wheat left on 27 August for Hull. The steamer made one more trip from England to North America before the end of the year.

On 13 October 1914 it was announced that the Den Norske Amerikalinje acquired two cargo passenger steamers, Cotswold Range and Chiltern Range and renamed them Trondhjemsfjord and Drammensfjord respectively. The company intended to put the vessels on their New York route to reduce expenses associated with chartering of extra tonnage.

Cotswold Range was officially transferred to the Den Norske Amerikalinje on the Christmas Eve 1914 and renamed Trondhjemsfjord.

=== In Norwegian registry ===
Upon transfer, Trondhjemsfjord left Hull on 24 December 1914 and arrived at New York on 20 January 1915. She left New York on her return journey on 27 January carrying general cargo such as butter, flour, leather, coffee etc., and had to stop at Kirkwall for inspection by British authorities before arriving at Trondheim on 25 February. The ship continued serving New York to Norway route for the remainder of her career.

=== Sinking ===
Trondhjemsfjord left for her last trip from Bergen in ballast on 16 June 1915. Originally, the ship was supposed to call at Baltimore first to load wheat, but the plans had changed and a different ship, Drammensfjord, went to Baltimore instead. Trondhjemsfjord sailed directly to New York and arrived there on 5 July. After loading her usual cargo of foodstuffs and coal, the steamer departed for her return trip on 13 July. The ship was under command of captain Bang and had a crew of 33 men and had 4 passengers on board. At 02:40 on 27 July 1915 in an approximate position 62°40′N 13°12′W the ship was stopped by the British auxiliary cruiser Hildebrand for inspection. The captain showed the papers including a letter issued by the British consulate in New York certifying that the ship carried no contraband. Nevertheless, the steamer was boarded by a British naval officer and 5 marines and was ordered to proceed for inspection to Kirkwall. At 0:53 on 28 July Trondhjemsfjord passed by Sumba and continued sailing southeast. At around 12:25 a shot was fired across the bow of the vessel, and soon after a submarine was noticed on a starboard side of the ship. Trondhjemsfjord changed course and came to a stop at 12:50 when the submarine caught up with the vessel and came by her side. Captain Bang went on board the submarine and presented all the papers, including the Bill of Sale showing the vessel passed into Norwegian registry on 23 December 1914. The submarine's commander informed captain Bang that according to his instructions, any ship that switched registry at least 30 days prior to the outbreak of the war have to be considered as belonging to the nation she was acquired from. Since Trondhjemsfjord used to be a British vessel, she was considered an enemy and had to be destroyed. The crew lowered lifeboats from the ship, and abandoned her in orderly fashion at 13:30. Ten minutes later the submarine fired a single torpedo at the vessel hitting her amidships. Trondhjemsfjord sunk at 14:51 in an approximate position 61°08′N 03°27′W. The submarine took the boats in tow until she encountered Norwegian barque Glance. Trondhjemsfjord's crew was transferred onto barque who took course to the Scottish coast, and the submarine submerged and left the area. On 29 July about 10:00 Swedish steamer Orlando was spotted and the crew boarded her and was taken safely to Helsingborg. It was later discovered that the German submarine U-41 was responsible for the sinking.
