= Rein Henriksen =

Norwegian lawyer and industrialist

Rein Henriksen (17 December 1915 – 29 April 1994) was a Norwegian lawyer and industrialist.

He was born in Oslo as a son of Gustav Severin Henriksen. He was hired in Borregaard Industrier in 1947, and advanced to director general from 1960 to 1978. From 1973 to 1975 he was the president of the Federation of Norwegian Industries, and from 1967 to 1972 he chaired the central committee of the Norwegian Employers' Confederation.
