= Hinrichsen =

Hinrichsen is a surname. Notable people with the surname include:

- Diederich Hinrichsen (born 1939), German mathematician
- Eric Hinrichsen (born 1976), Canadian basketball player
- Henri Hinrichsen (1868–1942), German publisher
- Niels Hinrichsen (born 1942), Danish actor
- Siegmund Hinrichsen (1841–1902), German banker and politician
- Silke Hinrichsen (1957–2012), German politician (SSW)
- William H. Hinrichsen (1850–1907), American politician
