= Gustav Henriksen =

Norwegian businessman

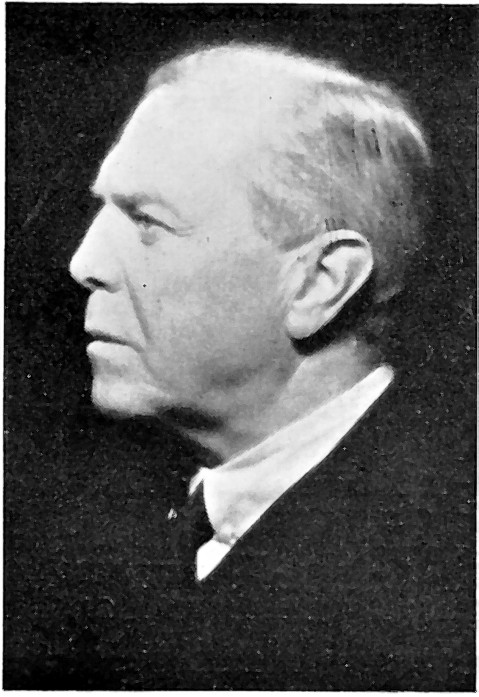
Gustav Henriksen

Gustav Severin Henriksen (25 October 1872 – 8 October 1939) was a Norwegian shipping executive.

== Biography ==
Henriksen was born at Tune (now Sarpsborg) in Østfold, Norway. He was the son of Christian Henriksen (1829-1886) and Marthe Nielsen (1842-1923). After the death of his father in 1886, his mother moved the family of Christiania (now Oslo), where he attended trade school. In 1889, he became an employee of the Otto Thoresen Shipping Company (1889–1911). Henriksen was the managing director of the Norwegian America Line (NAL) from its inception in 1911 until his death in 1939. He also had a long tenure as president of the Norwegian Shipowners' Association.

== Personal life ==
In 1908, he married Lisken Dall (1882–1974). Gustav Henriksen was the father of lawyer Rein Henriksen and of Hans Christian Henriksen who later was chief executive officer of the Norwegian America Line.
