= MS Bergensfjord (2013) =

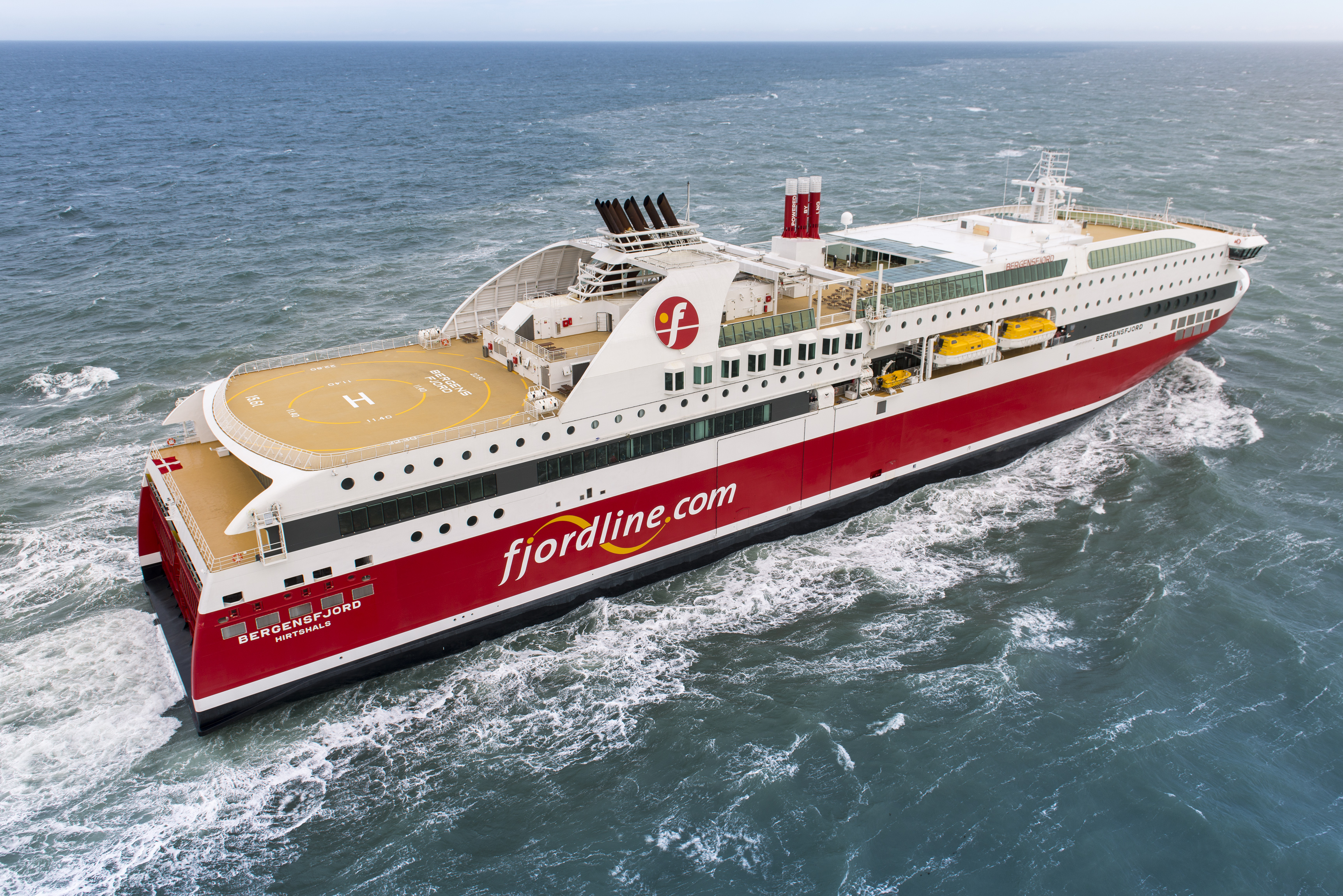
- MS Bergensfjord

History
- Name: Bergensfjord
- Owner: Fjord Skibsholding IV A/S
- Operator: Fjord Line
- Port of registry: Hirtshals Denmark
- Ordered: 17 March 2010
- Builder: Stocznia Gdansk, Bergen Group Fosen
- Yard number: 88
- Laid down: 27 May 2011
- Launched: 1 March 2013
- Acquired: 3 February 2014
- In service: April 2014
- Out of service: February to June 2023
- Identification: Callsign: OYPJ2; IMO number: 9586617; MMSI number: 219348000
- Status: In Service

General characteristics
- Type: Cruiseferry
- Tonnage: 31,678 GT
- Length: 170 m (560 ft)
- Beam: 27.5 m (90 ft)
- Draught: 6.35 m (20.8 ft)
- Decks: 10
- Propulsion: LNG/MGO
- Speed: 21.5 knots (39.8 km/h; 24.7 mph)
- Capacity: 1,500 passengers, 600 vehicles.
- Crew: 70-100

MS Bergensfjord is a cruise ferry owned and operated by the Norwegian ferry operator Fjord Line. It is used on their Hirtshals – Kristiansand – Stavanger – Bergen route.

The ship was ordered in March 2010, launched in March 2013, and delivered to Fjord Line on 3 February 2014. Bergensfjord is the sister ship of the Stavangerfjord, built in 2013. Like its sister ship, it ran exclusively on liquefied natural gas from 2013 to 2022. Due to the 2021–2023 global energy crisis increasing LNG prices to uneconomic levels, Fjord Line decided to replace the LNG-only engines with dual-fuel engines.

== Operations ==
The vessel primarily operates on the Hirtshals–Kristiansand route, with onward service to Stavanger and Bergen. The crossing duration between Hirtshals and Kristiansand is approximately 3 hours 45 minutes.

== Service history ==
In 2022–2023, Fjord Line decided to retrofit Bergensfjord from LNG-only propulsion to dual-fuel engines capable of operating on both liquefied natural gas (LNG) and marine gas oil (MGO), due to significantly increased LNG prices during the global energy crisis.
