= Hans Christian Henriksen =

Norwegian businessman

- Born: 25 June 1909; Kristiania, Norway
- Died: 26 August 1983 (aged 74)
- Education: University of Neuchâtel (economics)
- Occupation: businessperson
- Known for: chief executive officer, Norwegian America Line; chair, Oslo Stock Exchange Committee; chair, Norwegian Society for Sea Rescue
- Spouse: Agnes Cecilie Egeberg (m. 1934)
- Parents: Gustav Severin Henriksen (father); Lisken Dall (mother)
- Awards: see Awards

Hans Christian Henriksen (25 June 1909 – 26 August 1983) was a Norwegian businessperson.

== Biography ==
He was born in Kristiania as a son of Gustav Severin Henriksen and Lisken Dall. In 1934 he married Agnes Cecilie Egeberg, a daughter of Einar Westye Egeberg, Jr. and Kitty Parr. He became a student in 1927 and graduated from the University of Neuchâtel in 1931 with a degree in economics.

He was hired in the Norwegian America Line in 1933 and worked as director of the Norwegian America Line Agency Inc in New York from 1935 to 1939. He returned to Norway as office manager in 1939, and became vice chief executive in 1947. He was then the chief executive officer from 1948 to 1973.

He chaired the Oslo Stock Exchange Committee from 1956 to 1970 and the Norwegian Society for Sea Rescue from 1956 to 1961. He chaired Norsk Marconi Co and was a board member of Saudefaldene and Electric Furnace Products Company in Sauda, Meråker Smelteverk, Polaris-Norske Sjø, Skips-A/S Malmtransport, Assuranceforeningen Skuld, Nordisk Defence Club and the Norwegian Shipowners' Association. He chaired the supervisory council of Christiania Bank og Kreditkasse, Akers Mekaniske Verksted and Brage-Fram.

== Awards ==
He was decorated as a Knight, First Class of the Order of St. Olav (1956) and the Order of Vasa, was an Officer of the Legion of Honour and the Order of Oranje-Nassau, was a Commander of the Ordre national du Mérite and held the St. Olav's Medal.
