= SS Bergensfjord =

Norwegian ocean liner

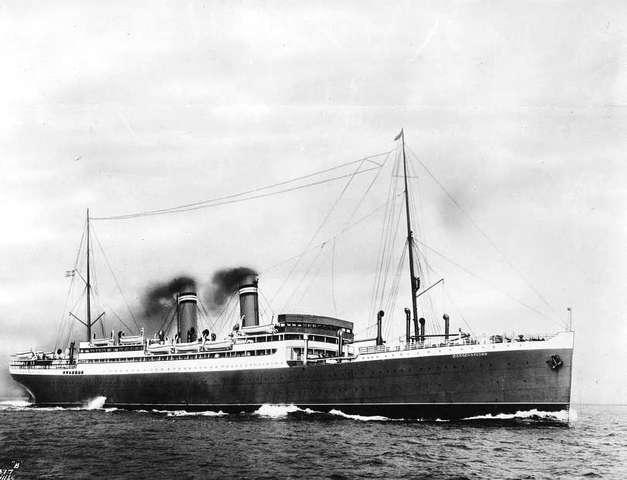
- SS Bergensfjord in 1927

History
- Name: Bergensfjord
- Owner: Norwegian America Line (1913–1940, 1946); Ministry of War Transport (1940–1946); Panama Lines (1946–1952); Home Lines (1952–1953); Zim Israel Navigation Co. Ltd. (1953–1959)
- Port of registry: (Norway) Bergen (1913–1946); Panama City (1946–52); Italy (1952–53); Israel (1953–59)
- Route: Kristiania – Kristiansand – Stavanger – Bergen – New York
- Builder: Cammell Laird in Birkenhead, UK
- Yard number: 787
- Launched: 8 April 1913
- Acquired: September 1913
- Maiden voyage: 25 September 1913
- Renamed: Argentina (1946); Jerusalem (1953); Aliya (1957)
- Identification: Code letters: MJQP; Code Letters: LFBA (from c. 1934)
- Fate: Scrapped at La Spezia in August 1959

General characteristics
- Type: Ocean liner (1913–1940, 1946–1959); Troop ship (1940–1946)
- Tonnage: 10,699 gross register tons; 6,550 net register tons; 7,300 tons deadweight
- Length: 512.1 ft (156.1 m)
- Beam: 61.2 ft (18.7 m)
- Draft: 29.4 ft (9.0 m)
- Installed power: Quadruple expansion engine with 8 cylinders of 26, 37½, 53 & 75 inches diameter each pair; stroke 51 inches operating at 220 p.s.i. The engine was built by the same company as the hull.; 1,469 nominal horsepower; 8 single ended boilers; 32 corrugated furnaces with a grate surface 590 sq. ft. and a heating surface 23,000 sq. ft forced draught.
- Speed: 15 knots
- Capacity: 1,200 passengers; 100 first class; 250 second class; 850 third class

SS Bergensfjord was a Norwegian ocean liner that sailed for the Norwegian America Line to the United States. During the Second World War she was requisitioned by the British Ministry of War Transport and used as a troop ship. After the war she continued sailing as a Trans-Atlantic passenger liner, first for South American owners, then for an Israeli company.

== Norwegian American Line service ==
Bergensfjord was the second ship in the fleet of the Norwegian America Line, built by Cammell Laird in Birkenhead, UK. Launched from its shipyard on 8 April 1913, she was put into service in September 1913, the same year as her sister ship, Kristianiafjord. She embarked on her maiden voyage on 25 September that year, sailing from Christiania (Oslo) through Christiansand, Stavanger and Bergen to New York. Bergensfjord had a tonnage of 10,699, and was fitted with Wireless and electric light. She could take 1,200 passengers – 100 first class, 250 second class and 850 third class.

The Norwegian America Line vessels were ground-breaking in that they sailed directly from Norway to the United States, without stopping at ports in Continental Europe. This drastically shortened the time it took to travel from Norway to the United States, from up to four weeks by way of Europe to just one week with the N.A.L. ships. The level of comfort on board Bergensfjord, Oslofjord and Stavangerfjord was also much greater than on the ships previously available for emigrants. The Norwegian America Line experienced great success with its new ships and competed fortuitously with the DFDS Scandinavian America Line. On 11 January 1919 she rescued survivors of SS Castalia off Cape Sable.

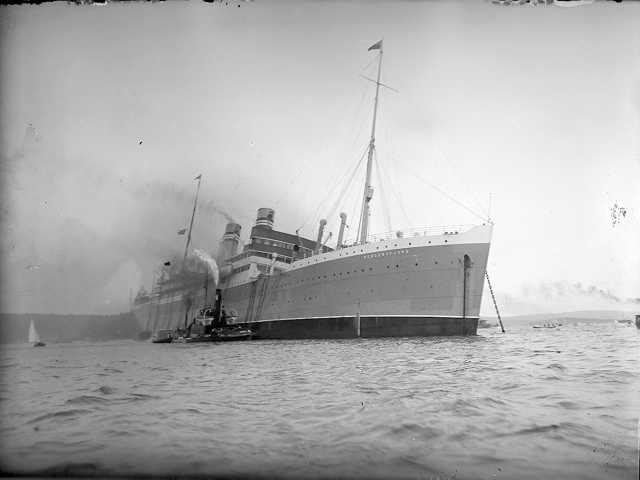
Bergensfjord listing and burning after the July 1924 explosion.

Bergensfjord suffered an engine room explosion on 26 July 1924 shortly after departing Bergen, forcing the crew to beach her. She resumed service in September of the same year after repairs had been carried out. In November 1925 she was refitted to carry 367 first class and 572 third class passengers, being further modified in September 1927 to hold 90 first class, 155 second class and 500 third class passengers. After engine modifications in 1933 her tonnage was increased to 11,015 tons. In January 1939 she was converted to carry only first and third class passengers, dispensing of the second class category.

== Second World War ==
Bergensfjord embarked on her last journey from Bergen to New York on 7 April 1940, only two days before the German invasion of Norway. On arrival in New York on 15 April 1940 she was laid up. She was requisitioned by the British Ministry of War Transport in November 1940 and converted to a troop ship over the following months. The conversion to troop ship took place in Liverpool, and the ship departed Liverpool, via Glasgow, with the first troops in February 1941, heading for Durban (via Freetown). By the end of the war Bergensfjord had transported some 165,000 Allied troops, sailed 300,000 miles (480,000 km) and spent 919 days at sea. She had also carried several thousand Axis prisoners of war, as well as taking part in the repatriation of released Allied prisoners of war. As a troop ship she took part in the Allied invasion of French North Africa in 1942 and the invasion of Sicily in 1943. During the latter operation she rescued survivors of the sunken hospital ship Talamba.

In February 1946 she was used for a single voyage carrying GI brides to the United States, she was then returned to the Norwegian America Line. While repatriating some 1,400 troops and 200 civilians from Europe to Jamaica Bergensfjord experienced a mutiny amongst the soldier passengers, which was put down with great difficulty. The Royal Navy warship HMS Ballinderry came to assist Bergensfjord, and the soldiers were interned after the ship arrived at Kingston.

== Post-war ==
In August 1946 she was sold to Panamanian Lines Inc. for emigration voyages to South America and renamed Argentina. She started her first voyage from Genoa in Italy to South America on 13 January 1947. After modifications in 1949 she could take 126 first, 250 second and 574 third class passengers, beginning traffic between Genoa and Central America in September that year. In 1951 she started sailing between Italy and North American ports. Argentina was then sold to the Italian Home Lines in 1952. In 1953 she was sold to Zim Israel Navigation Co. Ltd. and renamed Jerusalem, sailing the Israel-New York City route. As Jerusalem was converted to carry 38 first class and 741 third class passengers and made 11 journeys from Haifa to North America. She was renamed Aliya for service on the Israel-Marseille route in 1957. She was sold to Italy for scrapping in August 1959, arriving at La Spezia 13 August 1959.
