= MS Jupiter =

Cruiseferry owned and operated by Vietnamese Jupiter Cruises

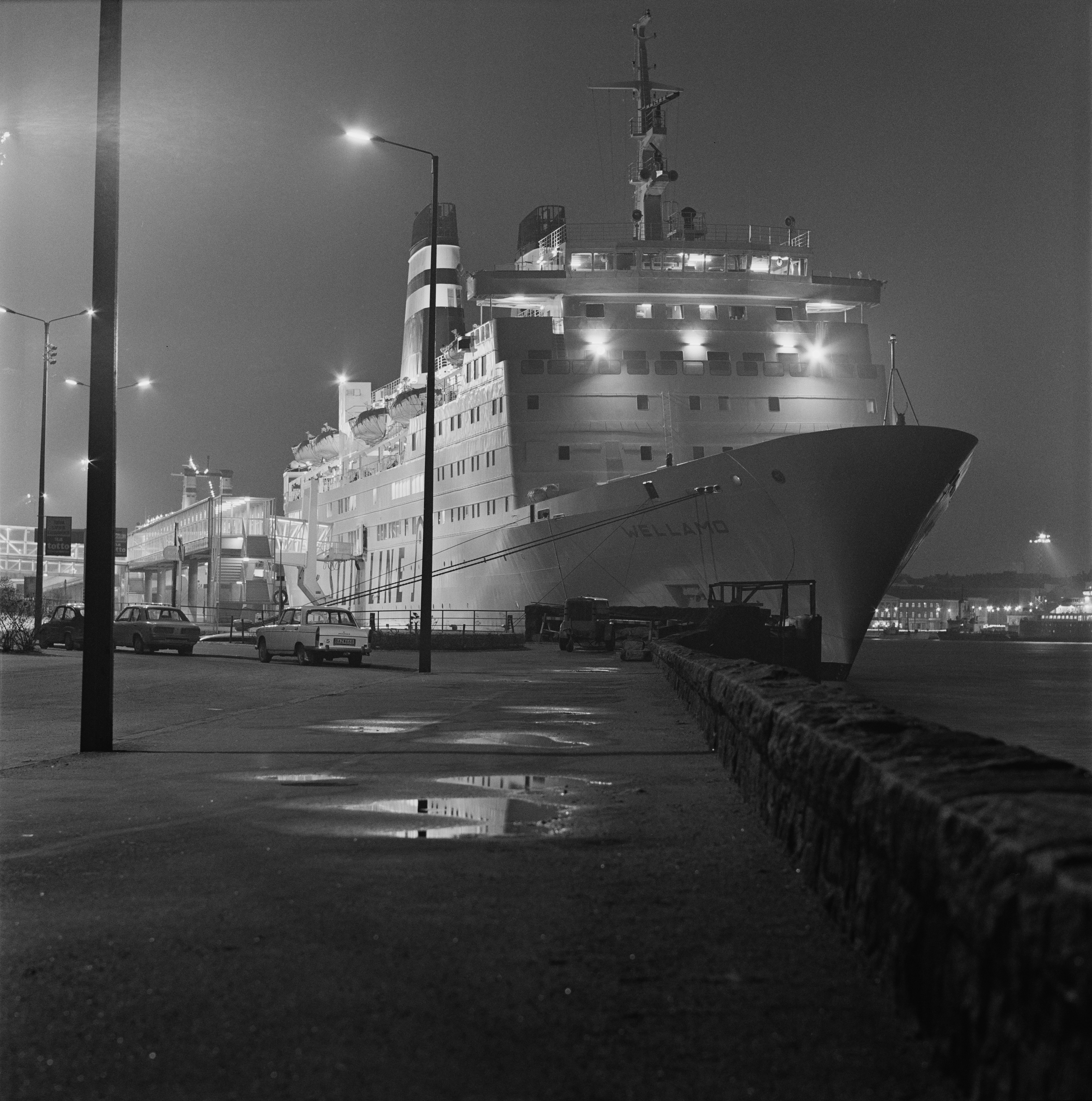
- MS Jupiter as MS Wellamo

History
- Name: 1974–1981: Wellamo; 1981–1984: Dana Gloria; 1984–1985: Svea Corona; 1985–1989: Dana Gloria; 1989–1994: King of Scandinavia; 1994–1998: Color Viking; 1998–2017: Jupiter
- Operator: 1974–1981: Silja Line; 1981–1984: DFDS Seaways; 1984–1985: FÅA / Silja Line; 1985–1994: DFDS Seaways; 1994–1998: Color Line; 1998–2005: Fjord Line; 2006–2007: Statoil; 2007–2017: Jupiter Cruises
- Port of registry: 1974–1981: Helsingfors (Finland); 1981–1989: Esbjerg (Denmark); 1989-1994: Copenhagen (Denmark); 1994–2005: Bergen (Norway); 2006–2007: Tromsø (Norway); 2007–2017: Panama
- Builder: Dubegion-Normandie S.A. Nantes
- Yard number: 142
- Launched: 15 September 1974
- Completed: 1974
- Maiden voyage: 1974
- In service: 1974
- Out of service: 2017
- Identification: IMO number: 7360186
- Fate: Sank on 4 November 2017.

General characteristics (after 1988 rebuild)
- Tonnage: 20,581 GT
- Length: 153.30 m (502 ft 11 in)
- Beam: 22.04 m (72 ft 4 in)
- Draught: 5.86 m (19 ft 3 in)
- Installed power: 4 x Pielstick 12 PC2-2V-400 diesels
- Propulsion: 2 × Controllable pitch propellers; 2 × Bow thrusters
- Capacity: 1,300 passengers; 320 cars

MS Jupiter was a cruiseferry owned and operated by Vietnamese Jupiter Cruises. The vessel operated cruises between Sihanoukville and the island of Phú Quốc. It sank November 2017 with 2 deaths, having been moored since 2010.

== History ==
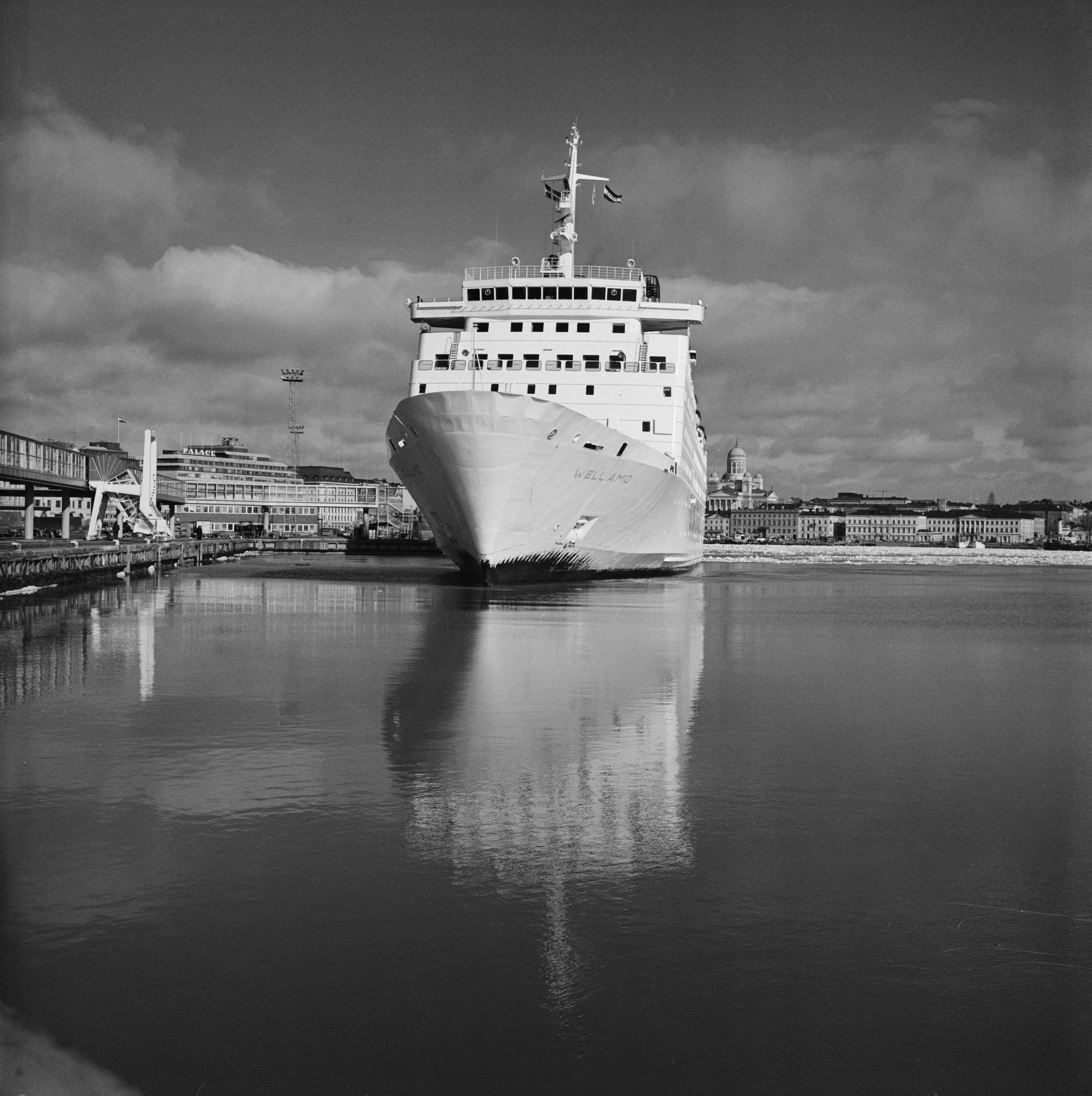
Wellamo

Jupiter was built at the Dubegion-Normandie shipyard in Nantes in 1974 for FÅA / Silja Line. The vessel entered service between Helsinki and Stockholm in July 1975 as the Wellamo.

In 1981 the super ferries Silvia Regina and Finlandia entered service on the Helsinki – Stockholm route. The Wellamo was no longer required and was sold to DFDS. The vessel was renamed Dana Gloria and placed on the Esbjerg – Newcastle route.

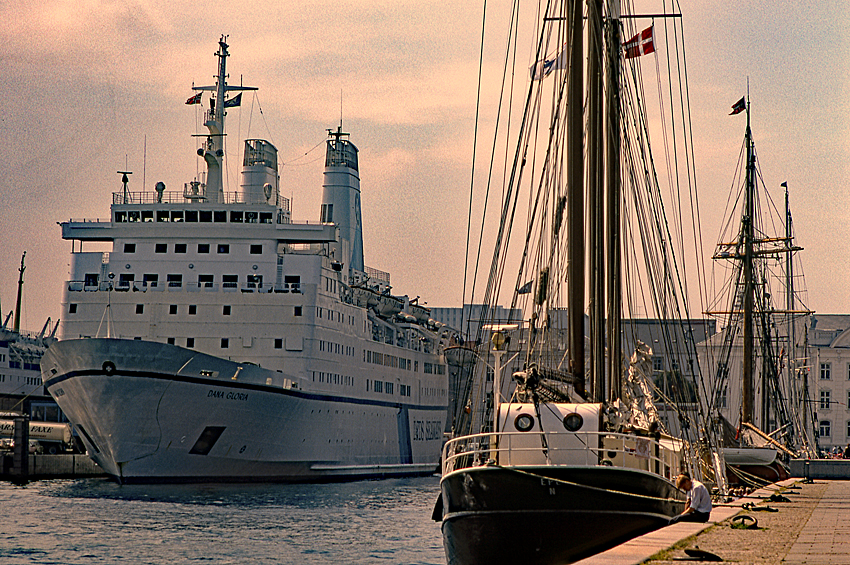
Dana Gloria in Copenhagen in 1986

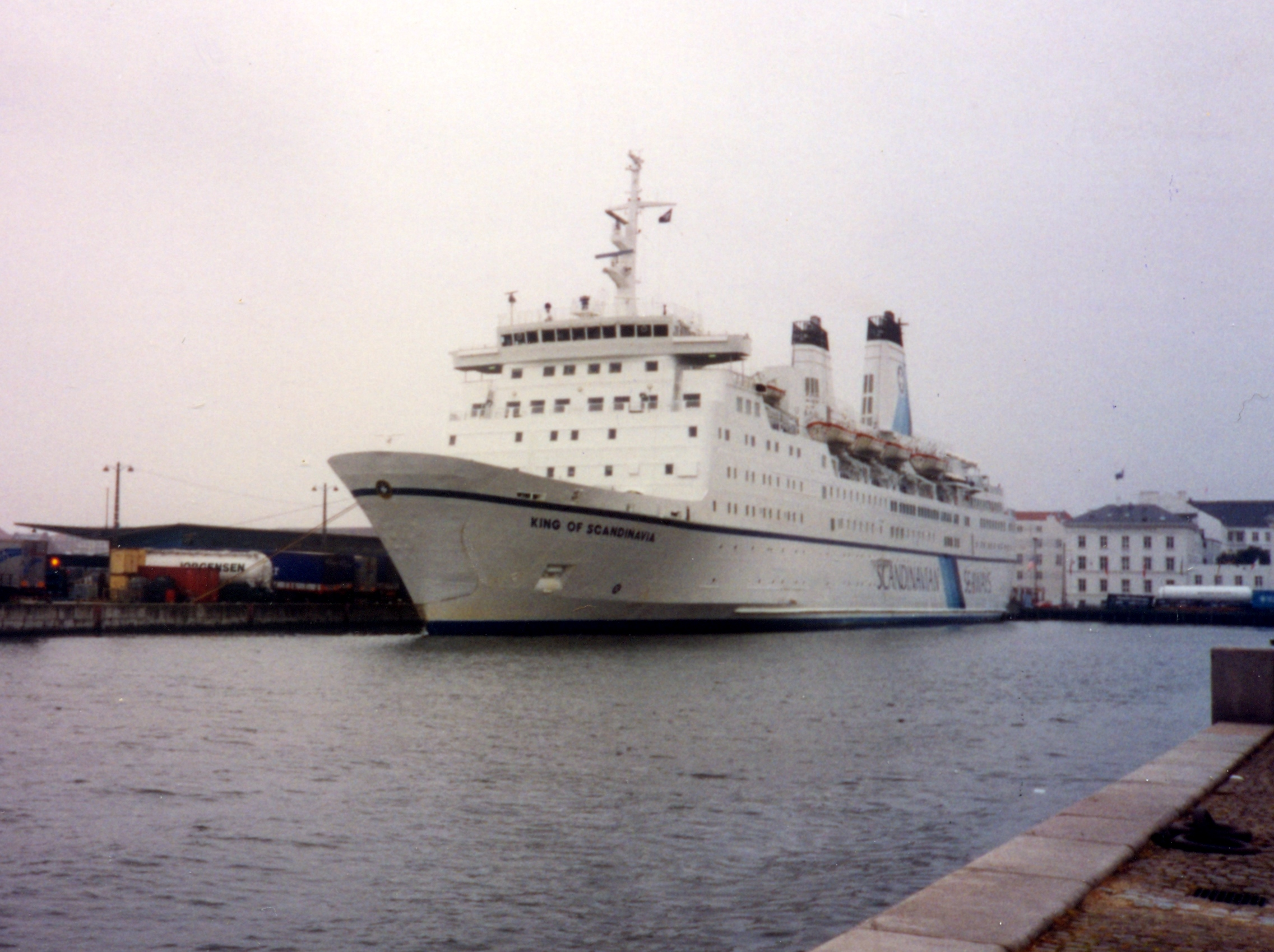
King of Scandinavia in 1993

Between 1984 and 1985 the Dana Gloria was chartered back to Silja Line. She was renamed Svea Corona and placed on the Stockholm – Mariehamn – Turku route. At the end of the charter the vessel returned to her previous name of Dana Gloria operating on the Copenhagen – Oslo route until the winter of 1988/89 when the vessel was stretched by 22.3 meters by Meyer Werft in Papenburg. She emerged from rebuilding as the King of Scandinavia.

In 1994 the King of Scandinavia was replaced on the Copenhagen – Oslo route by the Crown of Scandinavia. The King of Scandinavia was immediately purchased by Color Line, renamed Color Viking and entered service on the Bergen – Haugesund – Stavanger – Newcastle route.

In 1998 Color Line sold Color Viking and the Norway – UK route to Norwegian ferry operator Fjord Line. The vessel was renamed Jupiter. She operated the route until November 2005, being replaced by the larger Fjord Norway.

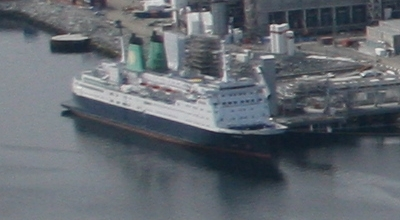
MS Jupiter at Melkøya, 2006.

Between February 2006 and February 2007 the Jupiter was chartered to Statoil for use as an accommodation ship at Melkøya Island near Hammerfest.

In April 2007 the ship was sold to Hong Kong–based Royal Group. The vessel operated cruises from Sihanoukville in Cambodia to the Vietnamese island of Phú Quốc.

On 4 November 2017, Jupiter sank off Binh Dinh, Vietnam. The vessel had been laid up since 2010 and was in very poor condition. It was unmanned and lacked maintenance. The vessel could no longer sail under its own power and broke its moorings during Typhoon Damrey. Two out of the vessel's seven crewmen died.

The wreck can be viewed on Google Earth using historical imagery

== Sister ships ==
The Jupiter was the first of three identical ships built by the Dubegion-Normandie shipyard in the mid 70's.

- Bore Star – Broken up in 2013.
- Svea Corona – Broken up 1995.
