= Sophus Henrichsen =

Norwegian physicist

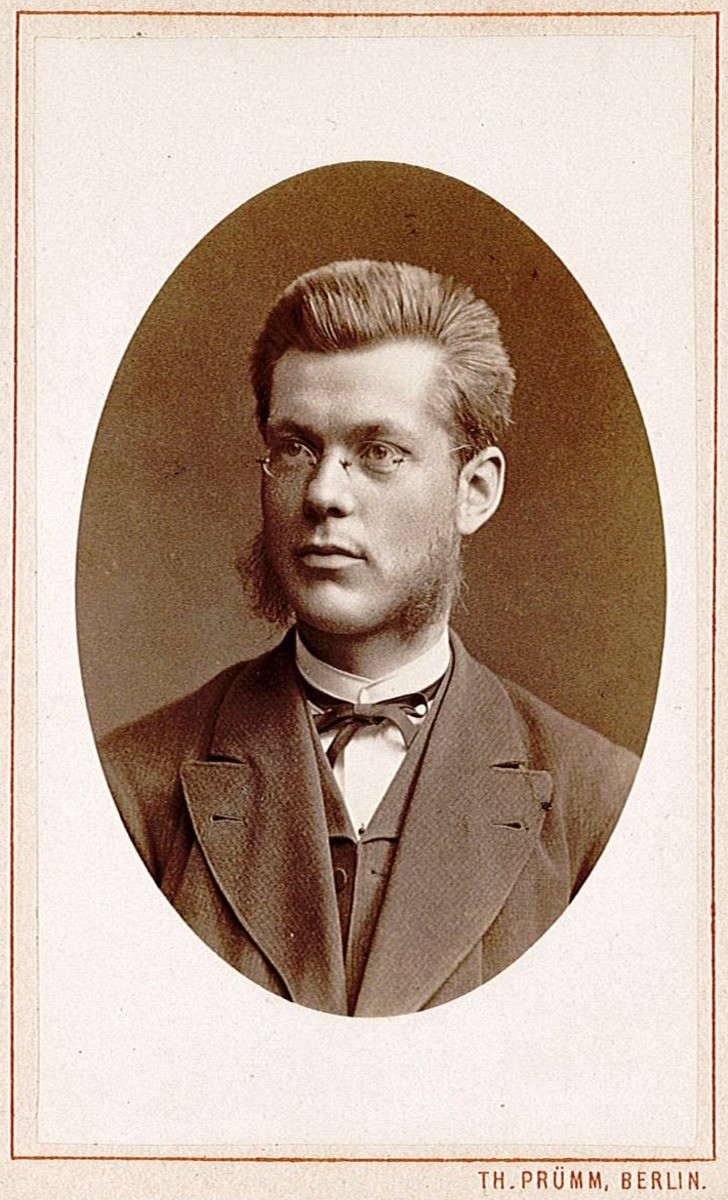

Sophus Septimus Henrichsen (12 November 1845 – 21 December 1928) was a Norwegian physicist and scientist. He worked at the University of Kristiania (Oslo). He wrote several textbooks of high school physics and organized the journal Nyt Tidsskrift for Fysik og Kemi in 1896.

Henrichsen was born in Kragerø to office manager Johan Georg and Sophie Septima Moe. He studied in Berlin and Leipzig in 1878-79 working under Gustav Wiedemann and graduated from the University of Kristiania, joining later as amanuensis in the physics department. After working at Nissen's, Aars and Voss' schools he became a teacher at the Oslo technical school from 1890, working there until 1920. His studies were on the specific heat of water, organic compounds and their magnetism, and also took an interest in other scientific fields.

He married Julie Adolfine Marie Forsberg in 1873 and the couple bequeathed their wealth to the Department of Physics at Oslo University.
