= Norwegian America Line =

Transatlantic shipping company

Norwegian American Line
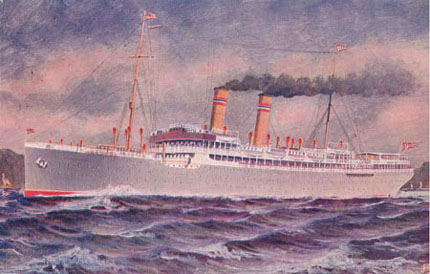
- Industry: Cargo and passenger shipping
- Founded: 1910
- Defunct: 1995
- Fate: Defunct
- Headquarters: Oslo
- Key people: Gustav Henriksen
- Subsidiaries: Norwegian East Africa Line

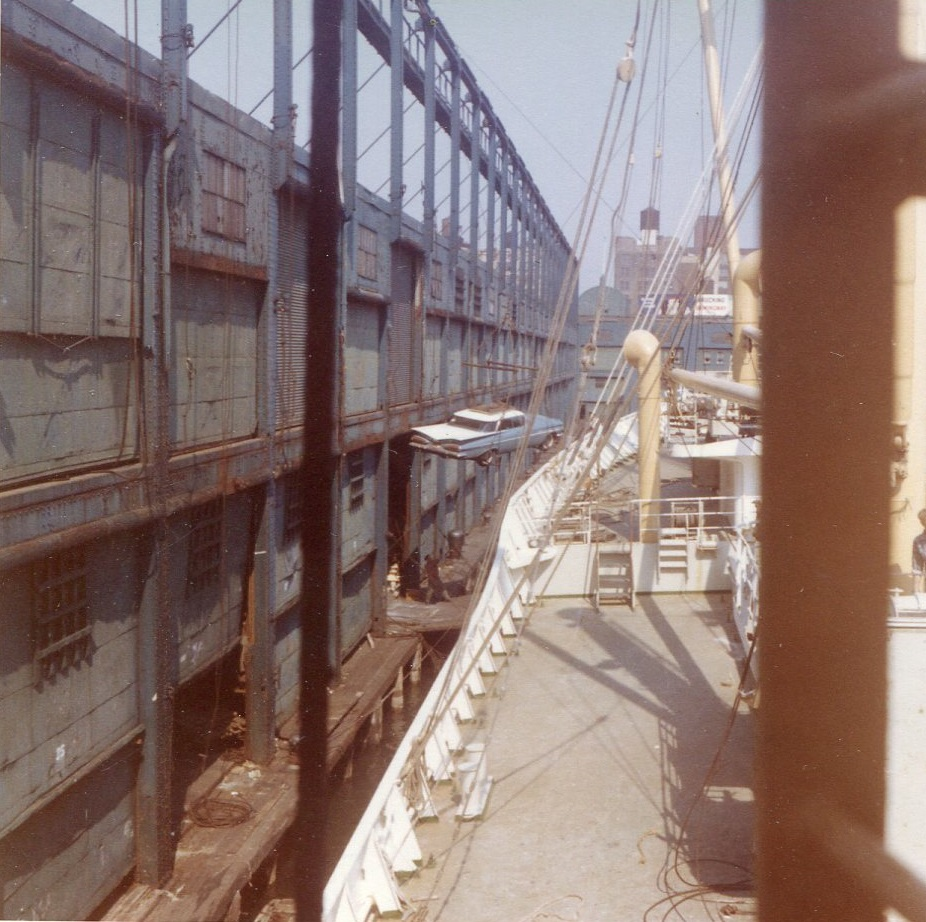
Passenger's car being loaded onto the MS Skiensfjord in New York in 1962

The Norwegian America Line (Norwegian: Den Norske Amerikalinje), was a shipping line, originally an operator of ocean liners and cargo ships. Founded in 1910, the company ran a regular transatlantic service between Norway and the United States, and later included a route to East Africa as well. Primarily due to competition from air travel, transatlantic passenger voyages were slowly discontinued during the years.

After the Great War, the company was one of Norway's largest shipping lines, owning a fleet that included 19 vessels, several of which were for commercial cargo transport. After the Second World War heavy ships losses were overcome by the building of new vessels, however the reduction in the passengers’ traffic by sea shifted the company’s focus mainly to the cargo business, including container and bulk shipping from the 1970s.

In 1980 the last two passenger liners were handed over into a new joint venture company (Norwegian American Cruises) with Leif Höegh & Co, and finally sold to Cunard Line in 1984.

During the 1990s NAL main business were the Roll-on/roll-off operations and sea carriage of cars, through the NOSAC brand (Norwegian Specialised Autocarcarriers), with a fleet of nearly 20 vessels, then acquired by Wilh. Wilhelmsen in 1995.

== Ships ==
List sourced from

=== Passenger ships ===
| Ship | Built | In service for NAL | Shipyard | Tonnage | Notes |
|---|---|---|---|---|---|
| SS Kristianiafjord | 1913 | 1913–17 | Cammell Laird in Birkenhead UK. | 10,699 GRT | Sunk 1917. |
| SS Bergensfjord | 1913 | 1913–40 | Cammell Laird in Birkenhead UK. | 10,666 GRT | Reused by Britain in 1940. |
| SS Stavangerfjord | 1917 | 1917–40; 1945–64 | Cammell Laird in Birkenhead UK. | 12,977 GRT | Captured by Germany in 1940, returned to NAL in 1945. Scrapped 1964. |
| MS Oslofjord (1937) | 1938 | 1938–40 | Deutsche Schiff- und MaschinenbauGermany | 18,673 GRT | Sunk after hitting a mine on the River Tyne, 1940. |
| MS Oslofjord (1949) | 1949 | 1949–67 | Netherlands Dock and Shipbuilding Company | 16,844 GRT | Chartered to Greek Line 1967. From 1968 onwards sailed for Costa Cruises.Caught fire and sank 1970 off Tenerife, Canary Islands. |
| MS Bergensfjord (1955) | 1956 | 1956–71 | Swan, Hunter & Wigham Richardson Ltd, UK | 18,739 GRT | Sold to French Line as De Grasse, 1971. Caught fire, and sank in 1980. Wreck still visible at Pireaus, Greece. |
| MS Sagafjord | 1965 | 1965–83 | Société Nouvelle des Forges et Chantiers de la Méditerranée, France | 24,002 GRT | Sold to Cunard Line 1983. Sold to Saga Cruises 1997 and renamed Saga Rose. Scrapped 2009. |
| MS Vistafjord | 1973 | 1973–83 | Swan Hunter, Tyne and Wear, United Kingdom | 24,292 GRT | Sold to Cunard Line in 1983. Renamed Caronia in 1999. Sold in 2004, renamed Saga Ruby for Saga Cruises. Scrapped 2017. |

=== Other ships ===
| Ship | Built | In service for NAL | Type | Tonnage | Notes |
|---|---|---|---|---|---|
| SS Trondhjemsfjord | 1911 | 1914–15 | ocean liner | 4,248 GRT | Sunk 28 July 1915 by torpedo. |
| SS Lyngenfjord | 1913 | 1933–38 | cargo ship | 5,732 GRT | Bought by Norwegian America Line in 1933. Shipwrecked 15 miles west of Cape St. Francis near Port Elizabeth, 1938. |
| SS Norefjord | 1919 | 1921–49 | cargo ship | 3,082 GRT | Ran aground, captured and beached by rebels, shelled by the Indonesian Navy and burnt out 1958. Scrapped 1966. |
| SS Drammensfjord | 1920 | 1925–49 | cargo ship | 5,339 GRT | Built 1920 in Canada, acquired by NAL in 1925 as Drammensfjord. Sold to Italy in 1949, broken up in La Spezia, 1959. |
| SS Foldenfjord | 1921 | 1921–28 | tanker ship | 7,038 GRT | Sunk by Japanese submarine I-25 on October 5, 1942. |
| SS Tanafjord | 1921 | 1921–54 | cargo ship | 5,930 GRT | Always sailed under the name Tanafjord for NAL. She was broken up in Stavanger, 1954. |
| SS Trondhjemsfjord | 1922 | 1922–43 | cargo ship | 6,753 GRT | Sunk on 27 April 1943 by British aircraft off Ryvingen lighthouse while on a voyage from Bergen to Kristiansand. |
| SS Oslofjord | 1923 | 1923–30 | | 215 GRT | |
| MS Tanafjord | 1956 | 1956–74 | cargo ship | 3,832 GRT | Sold to Greece as Elpis, 1974. Scrapped in Kaohsiung, 1979. |
| MS Skiensfjord | 1958 | 1958–77 | freighter, few passengers | 3,787 GRT | Sold to Southalnd Maritime Inc. v/Diamantides Maritime Co. Ltd, Pireus, Greece 1977 and renamned Diamant. Sold to Jebel Ali National Marine, Dubai, UAE 1980 and renamed Jebel Ali 2. Sold to Mohammed Khalifa Bin Salama Al-Hamaly, Dubai, UAE 1983 and renamed Salamah 5. Renamed Al Qasim 1987 & scrapped that year. |

== Managing directors ==
- 1911–39 Gustav Henriksen
- 1939–48 Andreas Johnsen
- 1948–73 Hans Christian Henriksen

== Chairmen of the Board ==
- 1929–39 Sigval Bergesen
- 1940–48 Thor Thoresen
- 1948–?? Leif Høegh

== Boutique hotel ==
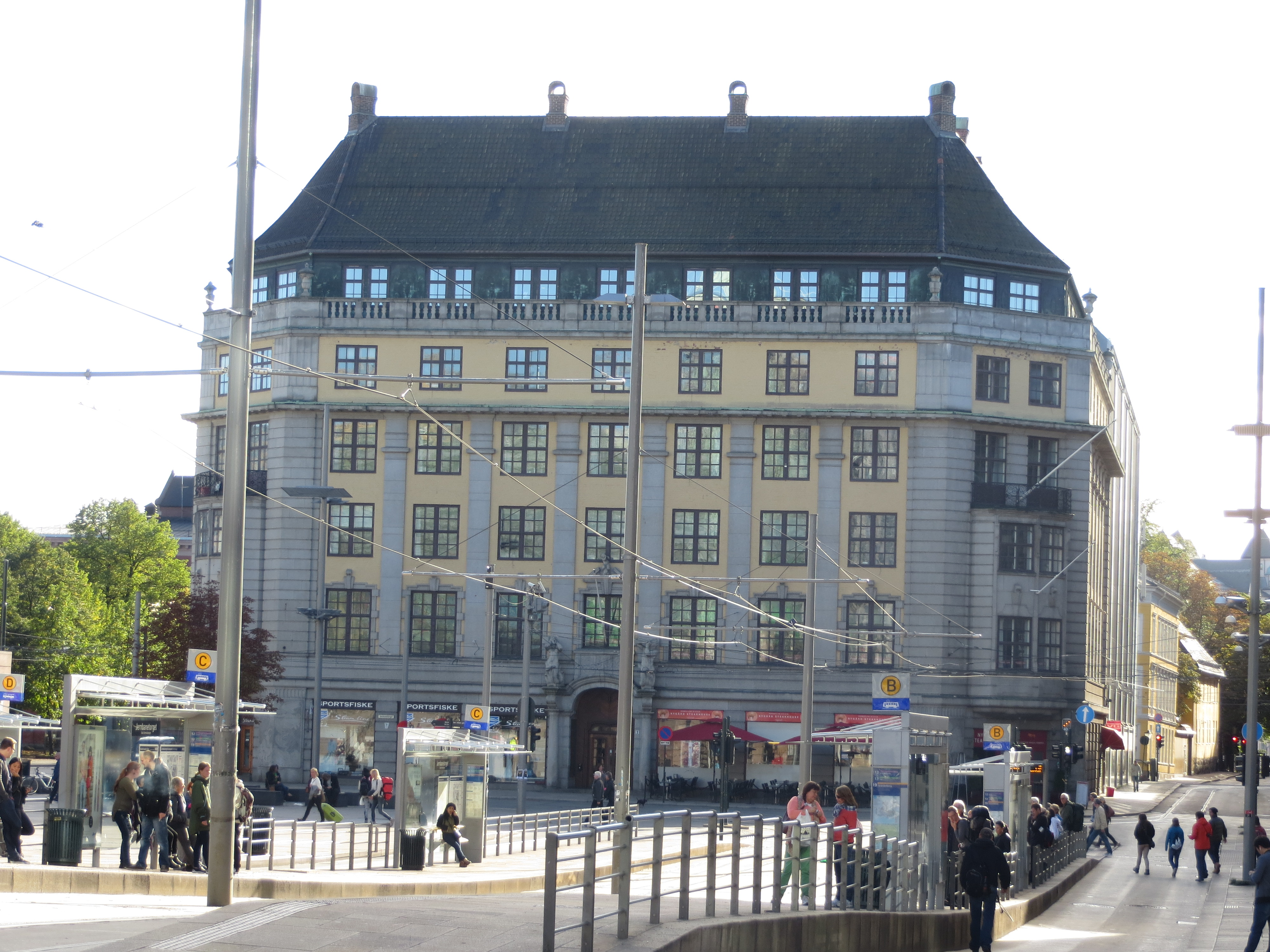
The former headquarters is now a boutique hotel.

The former headquarters of the shipping company (1919 – 1983) with ticket office and administration is still an iconic building in central Oslo. It was rebuilt inside and opened in March 2019 as a boutique hotel. The hotel took the name Amerikalinjen.

== See also ==
- Hamburg America Line
- Holland America Line
- Scandinavian America Line
- Swedish American Line
