= SS Kristianiafjord (1912) =

Historical Ship

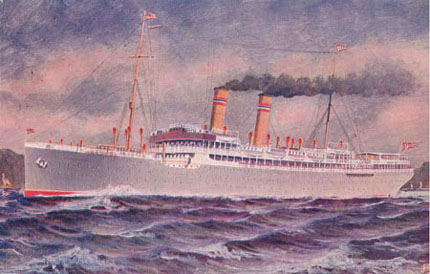
- Official postcard of the SS Kristianiafjord

History

Norway
- Name: SS Kristianiafjord
- Owner: Norwegian America Line
- Port of registry: Norway
- Route: Kristiania - Kristiansand - Stavanger - Bergen - New York
- Builder: Cammell Laird in Birkenhead, UK
- Yard number: 784
- Launched: 23 November 1912
- Acquired: May 1913
- Maiden voyage: 4 June 1913
- Fate: Grounded off the coast of Newfoundland on 15 July 1917 (not June) and sank on 28 July 1917 during a storm

General characteristics
- Type: Ocean liner
- Tonnage: 10,699 gross register tons
- Length: 512.1 ft (156.1 m)
- Beam: 61.2 ft (18.7 m)
- Draft: 29.4 ft (9.0 m)
- Installed power: Quadruple expansion engine with 8 cylinders of 26, 37 1/2, 53 & 75 inches diameter each pair; stroke 51 inches operating at 220 psi (1,500 kPa) The engine was built by the same company as the hull.; 1,469 nominal horsepower; 8 single ended boilers; 32 corrugated furnaces with a grate surface 590 sq. ft. and a heating surface 23,000 sq. ft forced draught.
- Speed: 15 knots
- Capacity: 1,200 passengers; 100 first class; 250 second class; 850 third class

SS Kristianiafjord was the first ship in the fleet of the Norwegian America Line, built by Cammell Laird in Birkenhead, UK. The name refers to the fjord leading into the Norwegian capital Oslo, at the time called Kristiania. Launched from its shipyard on 23 November 1912, it was put into service in 1913, the same year as its sister ship, SS Bergensfjord. It embarked on its maiden voyage on 4 June that year, sailing from Christiania (Oslo) through Christiansand, Stavanger and Bergen to New York, with the captain S. C. Hiortdahl. Kristianiafjord had a tonnage of 10,699, and was fitted with Wireless and electric light. She could take 1,200 passengers – 100 first class, 250 second class and 850 third class.

Kristianiafjord remained on the same route for the next four years, but on 15 July 1917 the ship wrecked near Cape Race, Newfoundland due to navigational error. There were 1144 persons on board at the time, but there were no deaths. About two weeks later, on 28 July, the wreck was destroyed and lost in a storm.

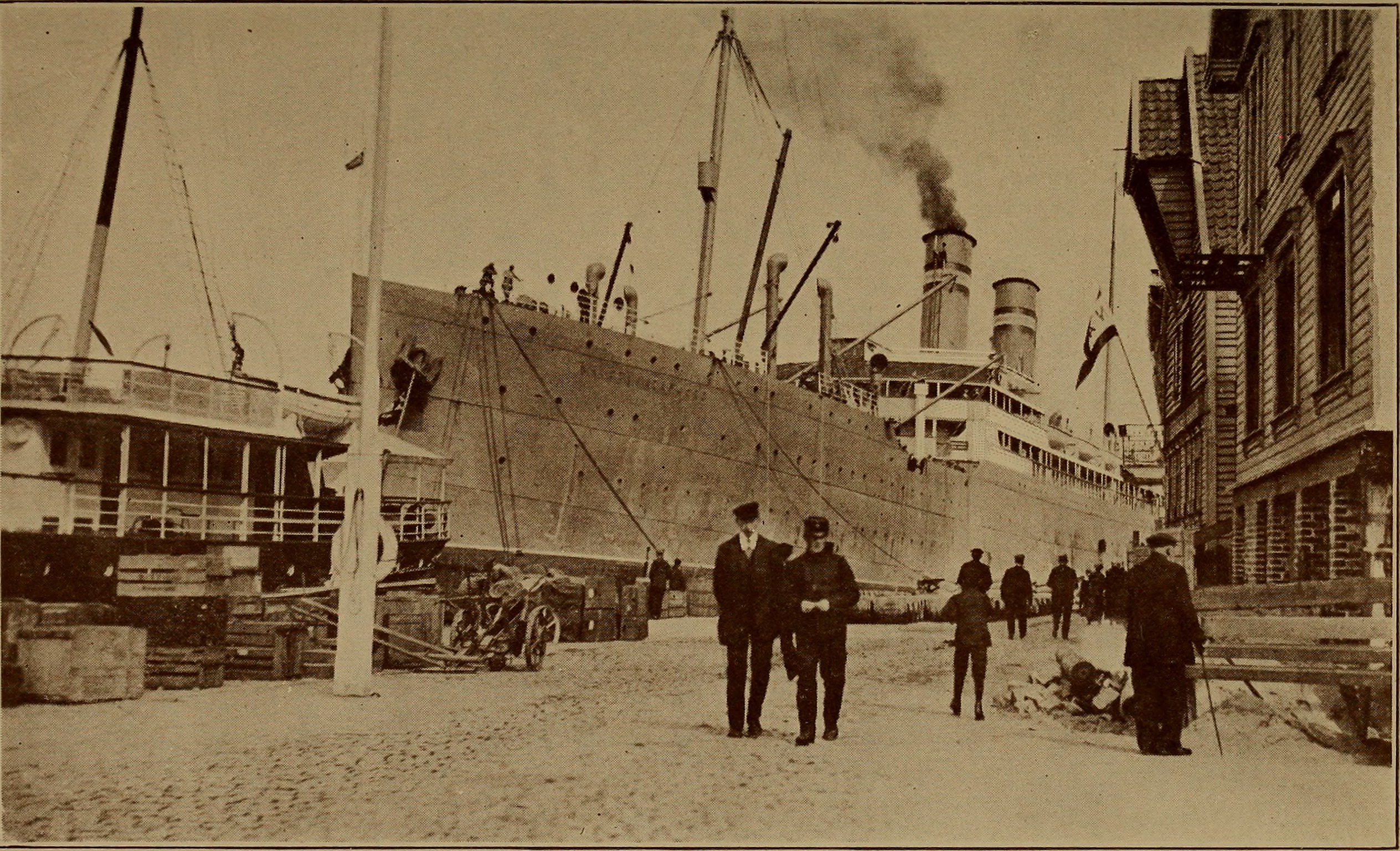
Kristianafjord

== Other ships by the same name ==
The same name was later used by the company for two other ships. The first one (tonnage 6,759) was purchased in 1921, and sold in 1955 to Marinos & Frangos, Nassau, who renamed it Aghios Stefanos. The last Kristianiafjord (tonnage 17,188) was a bulk carrier, bought in 1981. It had previously been in the possession of D. Lauritzen, Denmark, under the name of Dan Bauta. It was purchased by the Norwegian America Line in 1989, but sold to Vibeke K/S, Oslo, in 1993, and renamed Federal Vibeke.
