= MS Oslofjord (1949) =

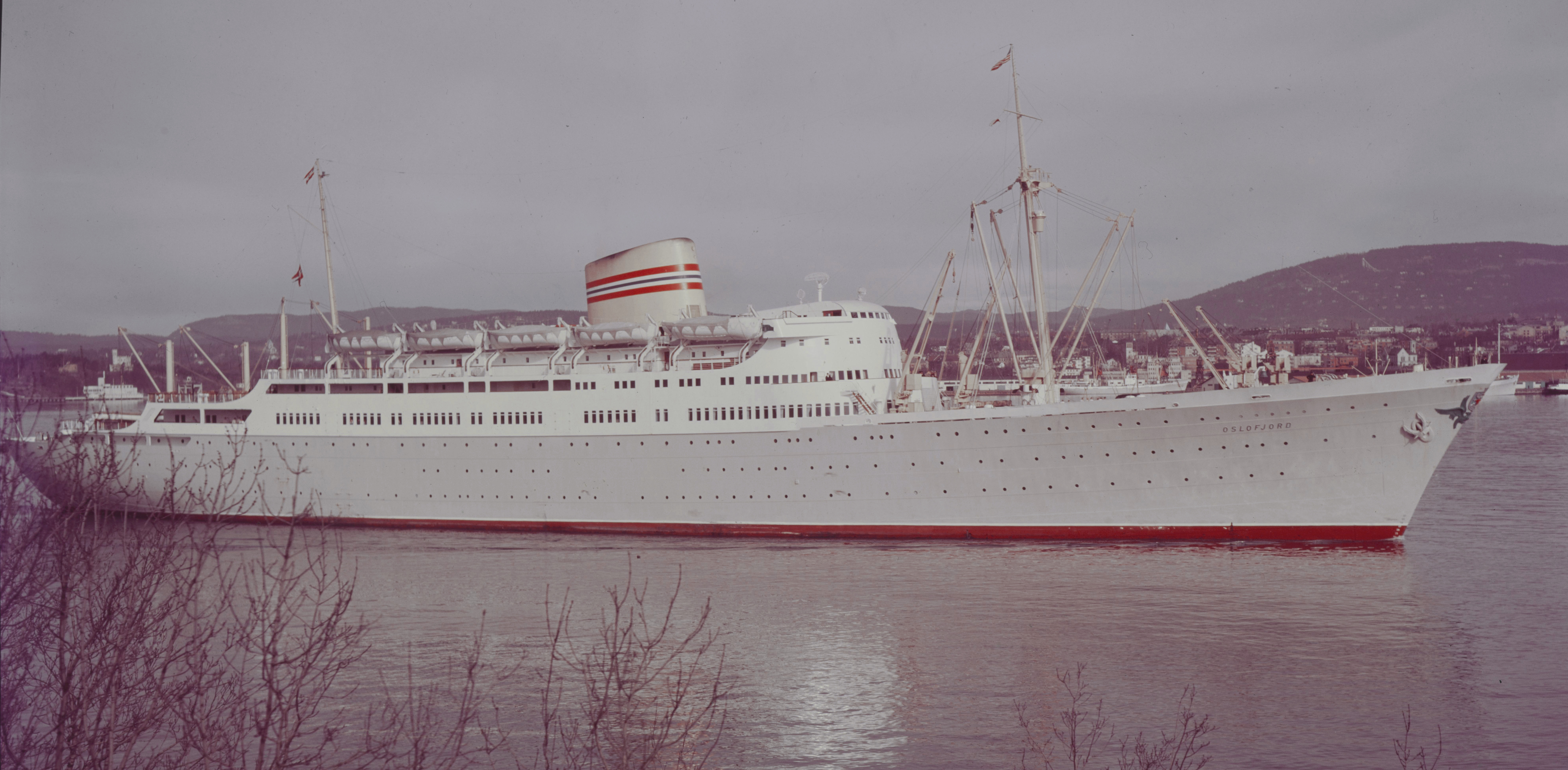
- Oslofjord in Rotterdam

History

Norway
- Name: 1949–1969: Oslofjord; 1969–1970: Fulvia
- Operator: 1949–1967: Norwegian America Line; 1967–1968: Greek Line; 1968–1970: Costa Crociere
- Port of registry: 1949–1970: Oslo. (Norway)
- Builder: Netherlands Dock and Shipbuilding Company
- Launched: 2 April 1949
- Completed: 1949
- Maiden voyage: 1949
- In service: 1949
- Out of service: 1970
- Identification: IMO number: 5266221
- Fate: Sank 20 July 1970

General characteristics
- Tonnage: 16,844 GRT
- Length: 166.23 m (545 ft 4 in)
- Beam: 22.03 m (72 ft 3 in)
- Draught: 7.65 m (25 ft 1 in)
- Installed power: 2 x Gebr. Stork & Co. diesel engines
- Capacity: 625 passengers

MS Oslofjord was a combined ocean liner/cruise ship built in 1949 by Netherlands Dock and Shipbuilding Company in Amsterdam, Netherlands for Norwegian America Line. As built she was 16,844 gross register tons, and could carry 620 passengers.

In an incident that made international news, in January 1957, while in drydock in Hoboken, New Jersey, USA, the MS Oslofjord tipped over and crashed against another ship. Eight crew members were injured and two were hospitalized. Two hundred other crew members were trapped inside the ship for more than an hour before being rescued.

In 1967–1968 she was chartered to Greek Line and from 1968 onwards to Costa Crociere, who renamed her MS Fulvia in 1969. Following an explosion in the engine room, the Fulvia caught fire near the Canary Isles on 19 July 1970, and had to be evacuated. She sank on 20 July 1970 while being towed to Tenerife.
