= SS Oslofjord =

History
- Name: Mari (–1923); Oslofjord (1923–1930); Vestnorge (1930–)
- Owner: Norwegian-America Line (1923–1930); Einar Veim (1930–)
- Builder: Framnæs Mekaniske Værksted
- Launched: 1923

General characteristics
- Tonnage: 215 tons

SS Oslofjord was a small steam-powered ship built in 1923, with a tonnage of only 215. She was originally named SS Mari, but she was renamed already in 1923. Oslofjord was sold in 1930.
