= MS Dalmacija =

Croatian-registered ro-pax passenger ferry

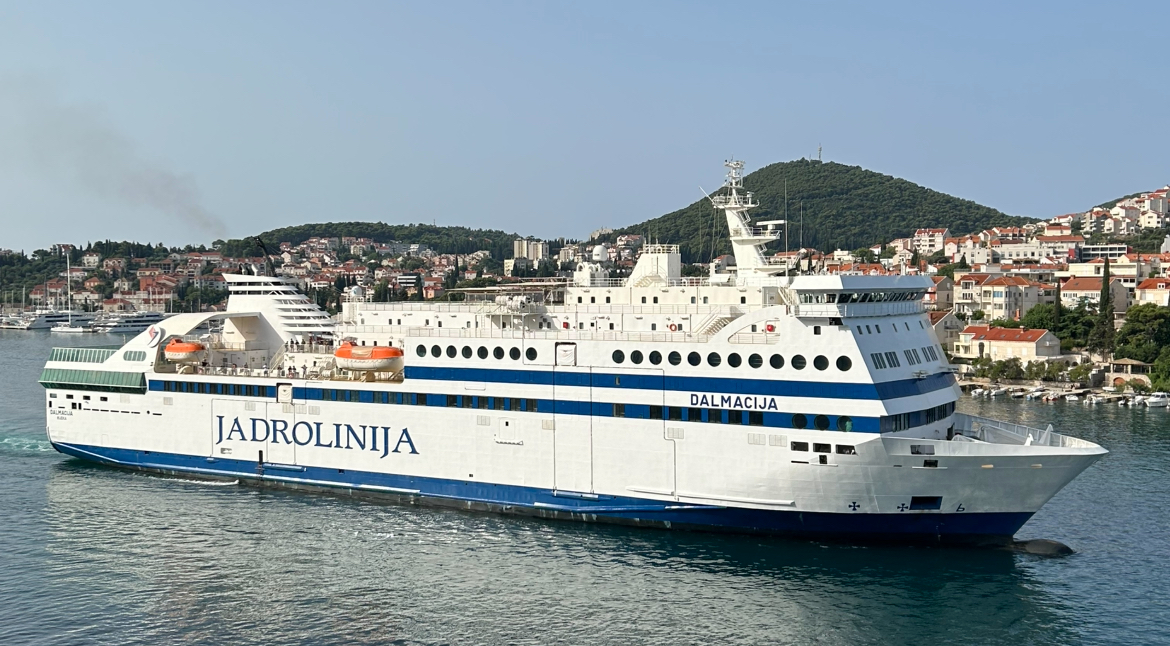
- MS Dalmacija in June 2024

History
- Name: 2024–present: Dalmacija; 2014–2024: Oslofjord; 2008–2014: Bergensfjord; 2005–2008: Atlantic Traveller; 2003–2005: Duchess of Scandinavia; 1993–2003: Bergen
- Operator: 1993–2003: Fjord Line; 2003–2005: DFDS Seaways; 2005–2024: Fjord Line; 2024–present: Jadrolinija
- Port of registry: 1993–2003: Bergen, Norway; 2003–2008: Copenhagen, Denmark; 2008–2009: Hanstholm, Denmark; 2009–2021: Hirtshals, Denmark; 2021–2024: Sandefjord, Norway; 2024: Hirtshals, Denmark; 2024–present: Rijeka, Croatia
- Ordered: 25 May 1992
- Builder: Fosen Mekaniske Verksteder, Norway
- Yard number: 52
- Laid down: 21 September 1992
- Launched: 29 January 1993
- Christened: 20 June 1993
- Completed: 9 June 1993
- Acquired: 19 June 1993
- In service: 1993
- Identification: Callsign: 9AA2031; IMO number: 9058995; MMSI number: 238016710
- Status: In active service

General characteristics
- Class & type: Ro-Pax ferry
- Tonnage: 16,551 GT
- Length: 134.40 m (440 ft 11 in)
- Beam: 24 m (78 ft 9 in)
- Draught: 5.20 m (17 ft 1 in)
- Installed power: 2 × Wärtsilä - Sulzer 8ZA40S diesel engines
- Propulsion: 2 × controllable pitch propellers
- Speed: 19 knots (35 km/h; 22 mph)
- Capacity: 1,350 passengers, 350 vehicles

MS Dalmacija is a Croatian-registered ro-ro passenger ferry owned and operated by Jadrolinija.

== Service history ==
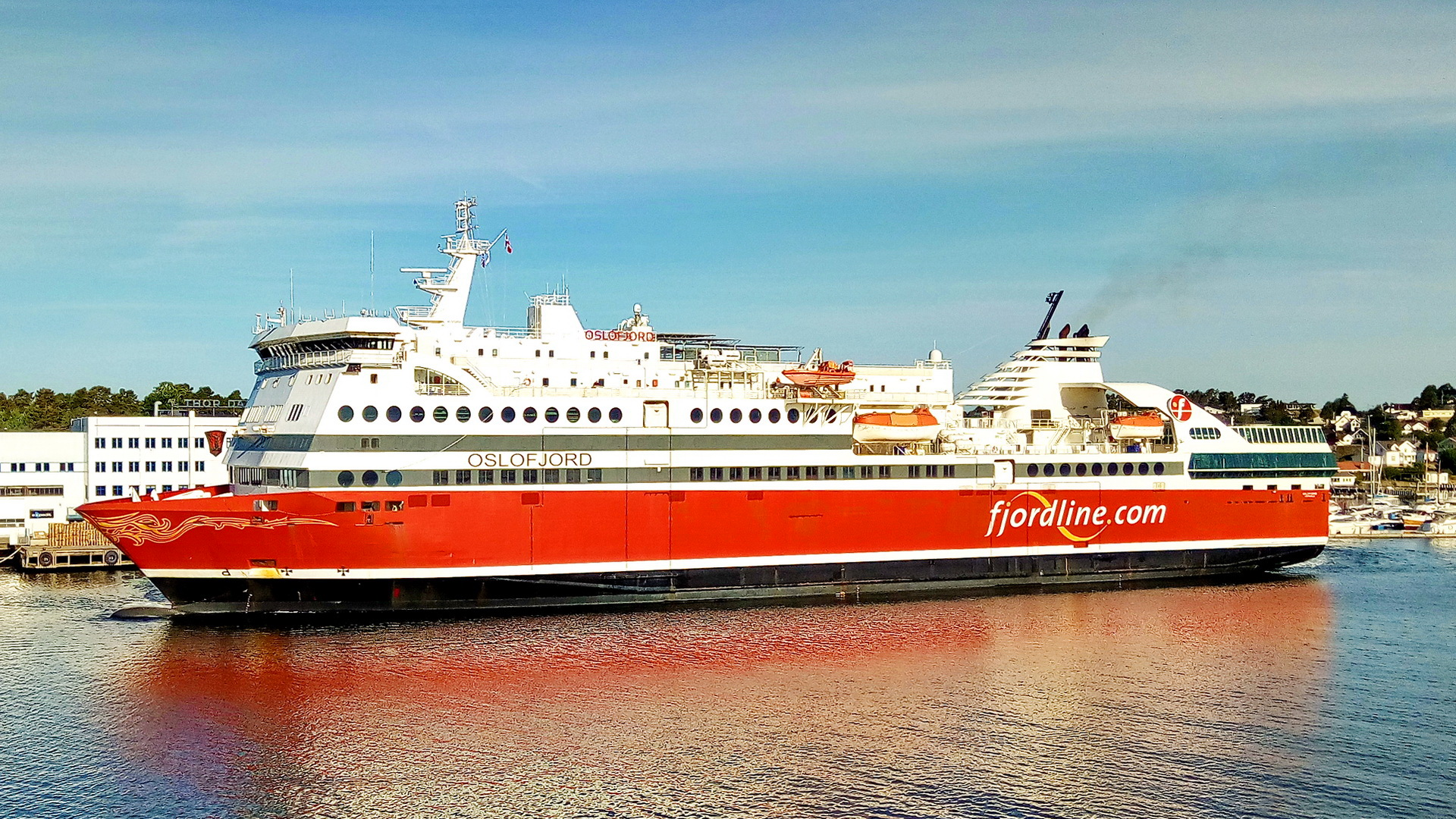
Oslofjord at Sandefjord in June 2018

The ship was built by the Norwegian shipbuilding company Fosen Mekaniske Verksteder AS in 1993. She was named Bergen and entered service with the Fjord Line. She was sold to DFDS Seaways and renamed to Duchess of Scandinavia in 2005, but was promptly sold back to Fjord Lines and operated under three other names: Atlantic Traveller from 2005 until 2008, Bergensfjord from 2008 until 2014, and Oslofjord after a 2014 renovation by STX Finland for about €30 million. She operated between Sandefjord and Strömstad starting June 2014.

On 25 March 2021, Oslofjord was transferred from the Danish Ship Register (DIS) to the Norwegian Ship Register (NOR). The reason given by the Fjord Line was that about 90% of the guests on Oslofjord were Norwegians. The re-flagging meant, among other things, that it would be easier to use Norwegian labor on board. The new home port for Oslofjord was Sandefjord.

She was purchased by Jadrolinija in February 2024 for 18 million Euros and renamed to Dalmacija. She was taken to the Viktor Lenac shipyard in Rijeka to "adopt the visual identity" of Jadrolinija. Once beginning operations with the Croatian company, she became the largest vessel in Jadrolinija's fleet.
