= RMS Franconia =

RMS Franconia may refer to the following specific vessels:

- RMS Franconia (1910), ocean liner operated by the Cunard Line, launched on 23 July 1910
- RMS Franconia (1922), ocean liner operated by the Cunard Line from 1922 to 1956
- RMS Franconia (1954), ocean liner, built in 1955 as RMS Ivernia and renamed RMS Franconia in 1963
