= RMS Ivernia =

RMS Ivernia may refer to the following specific vessels:

- RMS Ivernia (1899) launched in 1899 and sunk in 1917
- RMS Ivernia (1954) launched in 1954, renamed Franconia in 1963, Fedor Shalyapin in 1973 and scrapped in 2004
