= RMS Carmania =

RMS Carmania may refer to the following ocean liners:

- RMS Carmania (1905) – in service with Cunard Line 1905–32
- RMS Carmania (1954) – in service with Cunard Line 1962–73
