= RMS Franconia (1922) =

British Transatlantic ocean liner

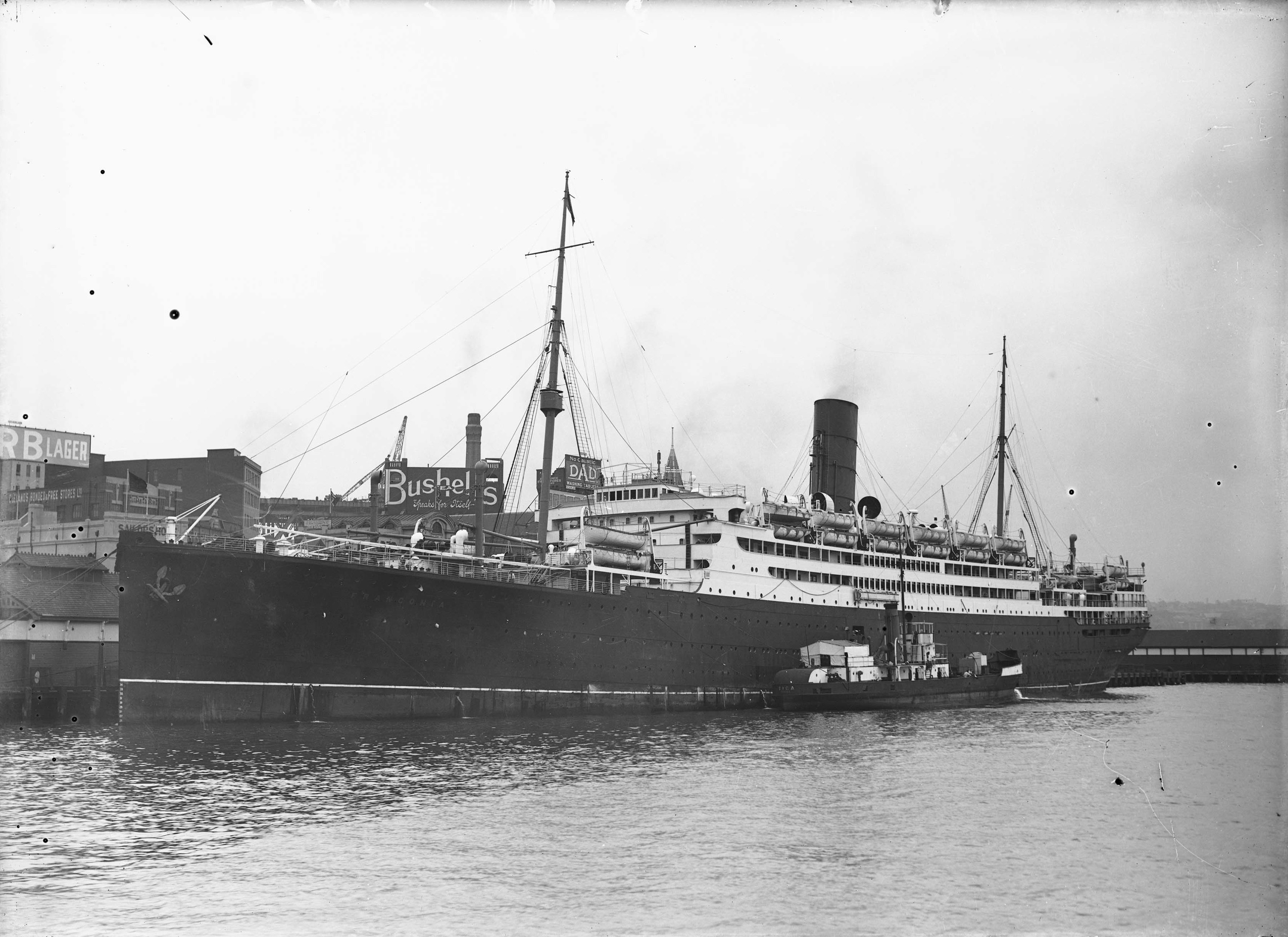
- RMS Franconia at Sydney, Australia

History

United Kingdom
- Name: RMS Franconia
- Owner: Cunard Line
- Port of registry: (United Kingdom) Liverpool
- Builder: John Brown & Co, Clydebank
- Launched: 21 October 1922
- Completed: June 1923
- Maiden voyage: 23 June 1923
- Fate: Scrapped at Inverkeithing by Thos. W. Ward, December 1956

General characteristics
- Type: Ocean liner
- Tonnage: 20,175 GRT, 12,185 NRT
- Length: 601.3 ft (183.3 m)
- Beam: 73.7 ft (22.5 m)
- Depth: 40.6 ft (12.4 m)
- Installed power: 2,562 NHP; 13,500 SHP
- Propulsion: Six steam turbines with double reduction gearing; twin propellers
- Speed: 16.5 knots (30.6 km/h)
- Capacity: Approximately 220 first class, 350 second class, 1200 third class passengers

RMS Franconia was an ocean liner operated by the Cunard Line from 1922 to 1956. The liner was second of three liners named Franconia which served the Cunard Line, the others being Franconia (1910) built in 1910 and the third Franconia in 1963.

== Pre-war ==
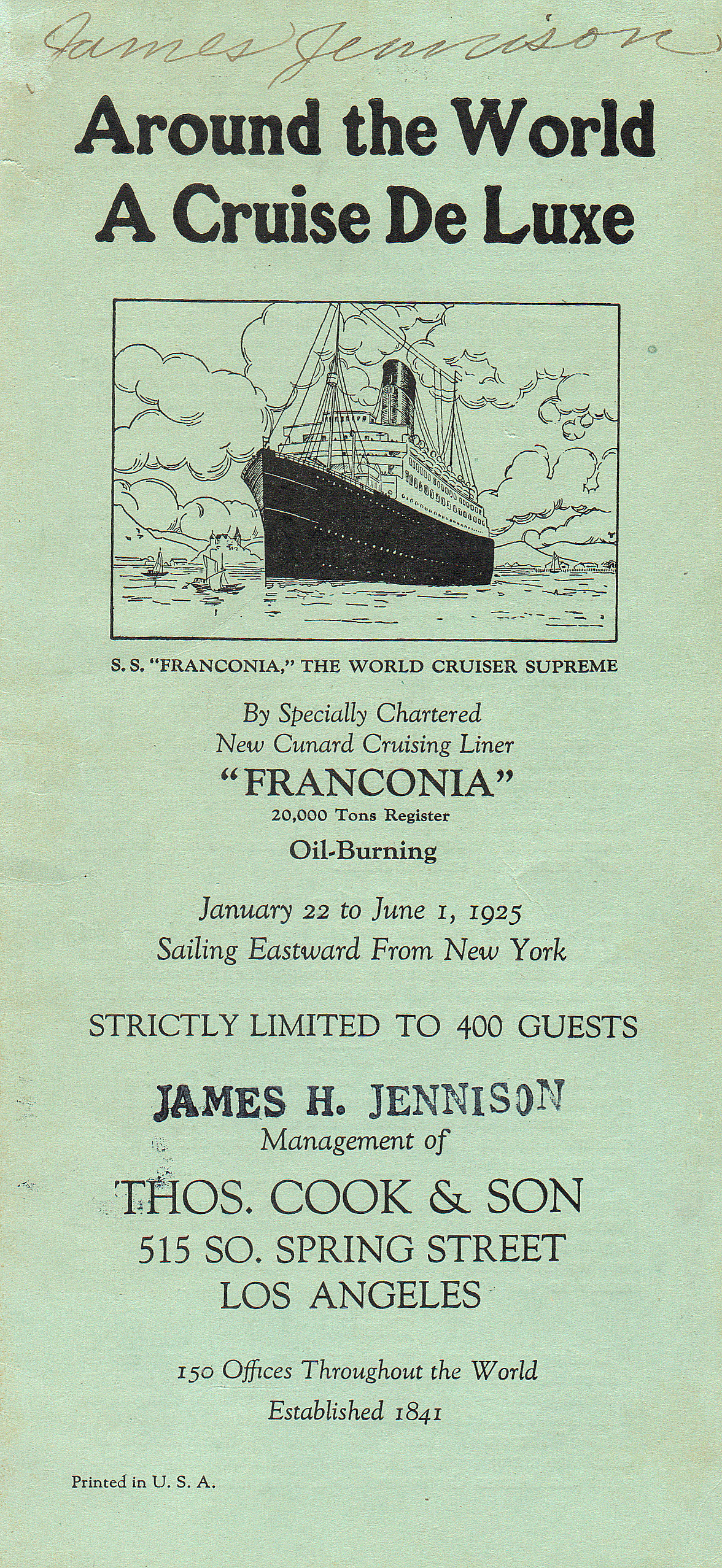
RMS Franconia's 1925 world cruise brochure

She was launched on 21 October 1922 by the John Brown & Co shipyard at Clydebank, Scotland. Her maiden voyage was between Liverpool and New York in June 1923; she was employed on this route in the summer months until World War II. In the winter she was used on world cruises.

On 26 December 1926, Franconia ran aground at San Juan, Puerto Rico and was refloated three days later.

She had a collision in Shanghai harbour in April 1929 with an Italian gunboat and a Japanese cargo steamer.

Spanish bestselling writer Vicente Blasco Ibáñez sailed around the world on the Franconia in 1923-1924 and published his experiences in the travel book The Tour of the World of a Novelist (1924-1925).

American songwriter Cole Porter, composed the song "Begin the Beguine", while aboard the Franconia from Kalabahi, Dutch East Indies, to Fiji in 1935.

== Wartime service ==
In September 1939, she was requisitioned as a troopship after refitting at Liverpool. She had a collision off Malta with the French troopship Marietta Pacha and was escorted to Malta by the armed merchant cruiser Alcantara. The ship was repaired in time to take part in the Norwegian campaign. On 16 June 1940, while en route to St Nazaire as part of Operation Aerial (the evacuation of the Second British Expeditionary Force from France), she was damaged by near-misses from German bombs and was escorted back to Liverpool for repairs.

Later in the war, she took troops to India and took part in landings at Madagascar, North Africa, Italy and the Azores. In 1945 she was used as a headquarters ship for Winston Churchill and the British delegation at the Yalta Conference. At the end of the war in Europe, Franconia made several trips across the Atlantic carrying returning US troops and refugees. After VJ Day she was employed repatriating British troops, including freed prisoners of war, from India. During her government service, she had covered 319,784 miles (514,642 km) and carried 189,239 military personnel.

== Post-war ==
Franconia was returned to Cunard in June 1948 and was refitted by John Brown & Co, Clydebank; finally resuming passenger service on 2 June 1949 on the Liverpool to Quebec and Liverpool to Halifax routes. In this role, Franconia brought many postwar immigrants and refugees to Canada. The ship sailed from Liverpool 28 June 1949 and arrived Quebec 5 July and sailed from Liverpool again 21 July arriving Quebec 28 July. In July 1950 she went aground on the Île d'Orléans in the Saint Lawrence River after leaving Quebec. After being pulled off the reef she was repaired and resumed in service on the Canadian run in September 1950. Franconia was retired in 1956 with her fleetmate RMS Ascania having been replaced on the Canadian run by Saxonia, Ivernia and the Carinthia.

== Legacy ==
Franconia's pre-war around-the-world cruises and distinguished wartime service made her a popular name within Cunard so in 1963, Ivernia was renamed Franconia to continue the name within the company. In recognition of her important Canadian immigration role, Cunard Line gave the builder's model of Franconia to the Maritime Museum of the Atlantic in Halifax, Nova Scotia.

== See also ==
- List of ocean liners

== Gallery ==
Franconia

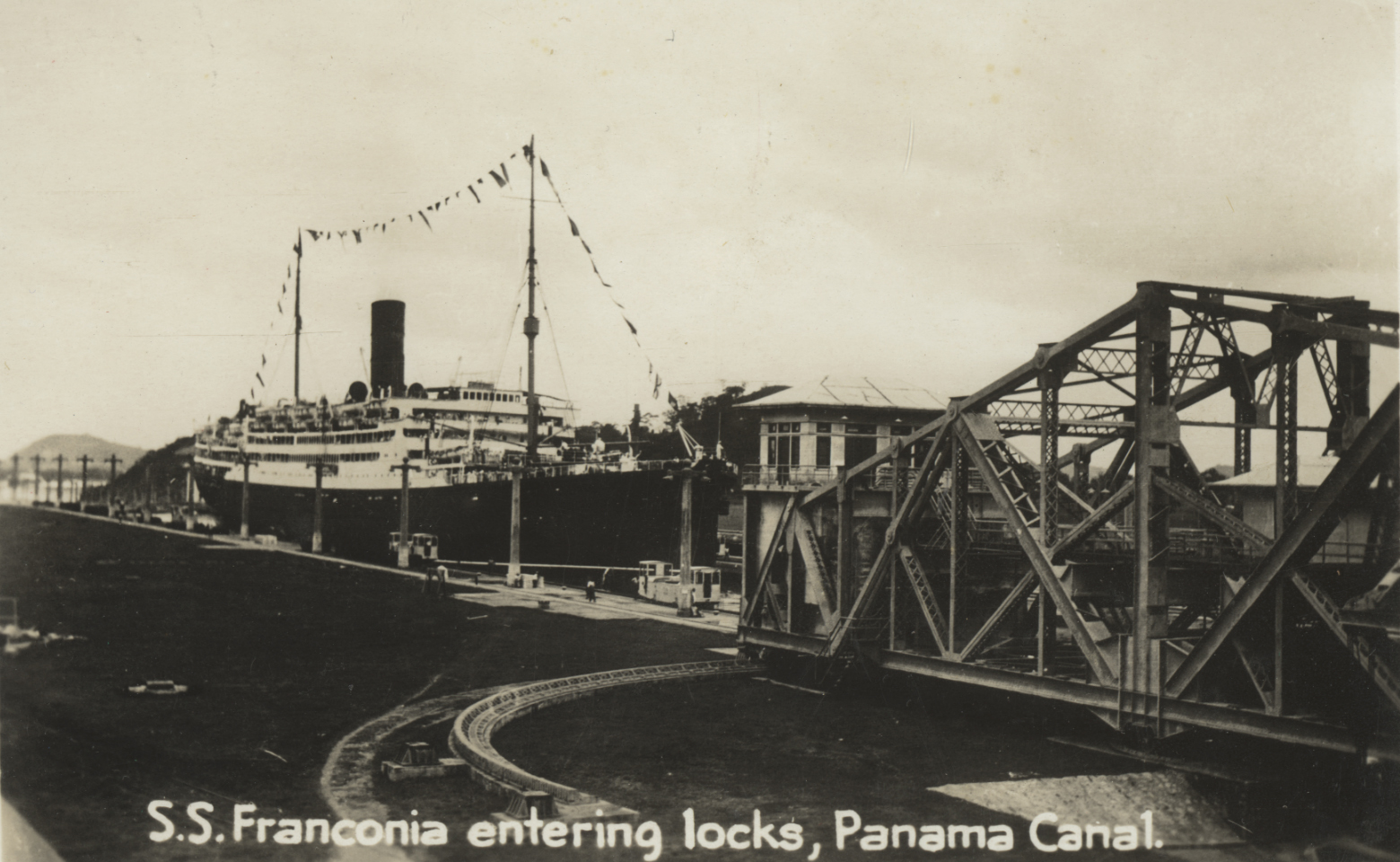
RMS Franconia, entering Panama Canal, ca. 1930

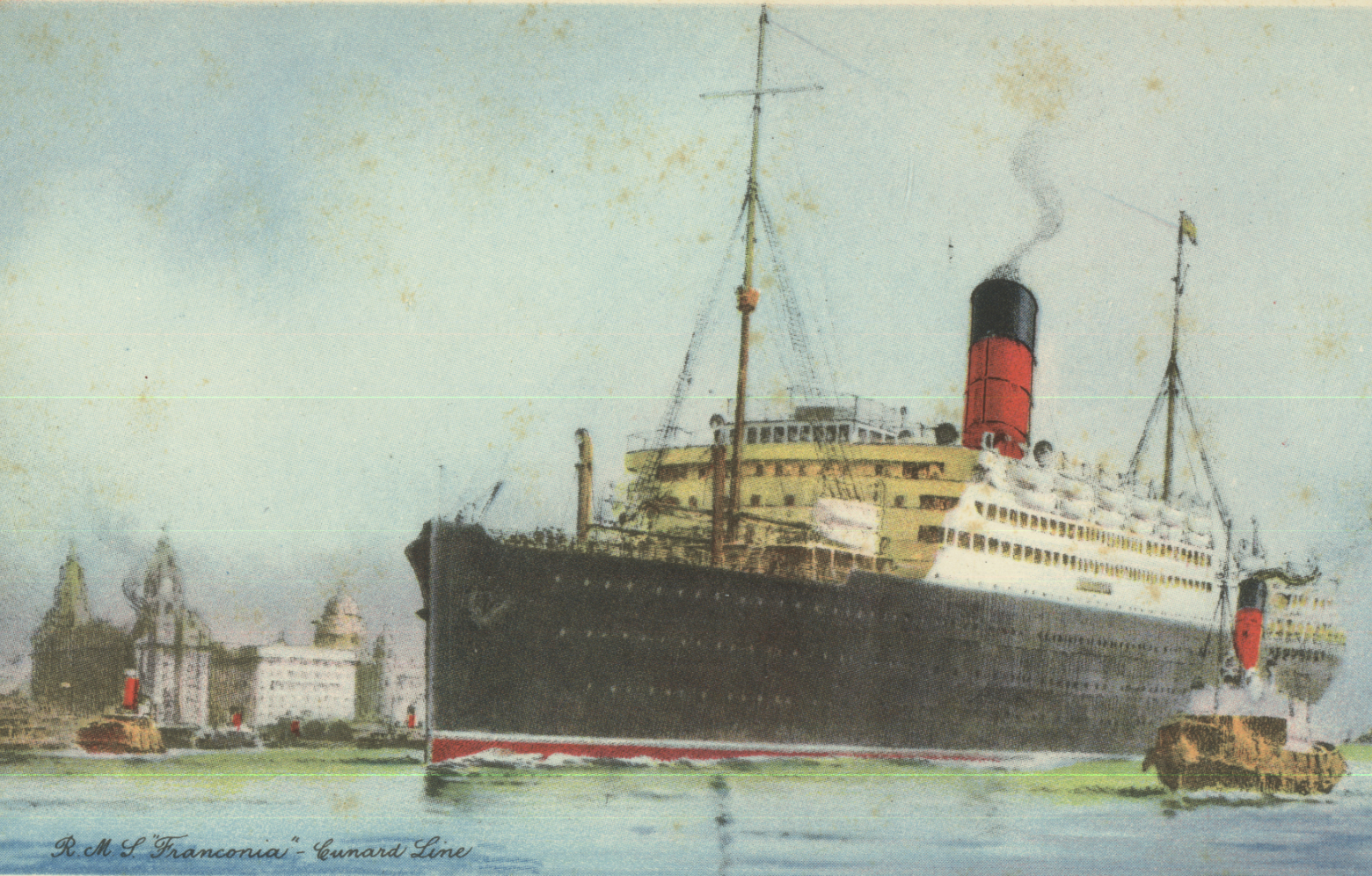
Franconia ca. 1930

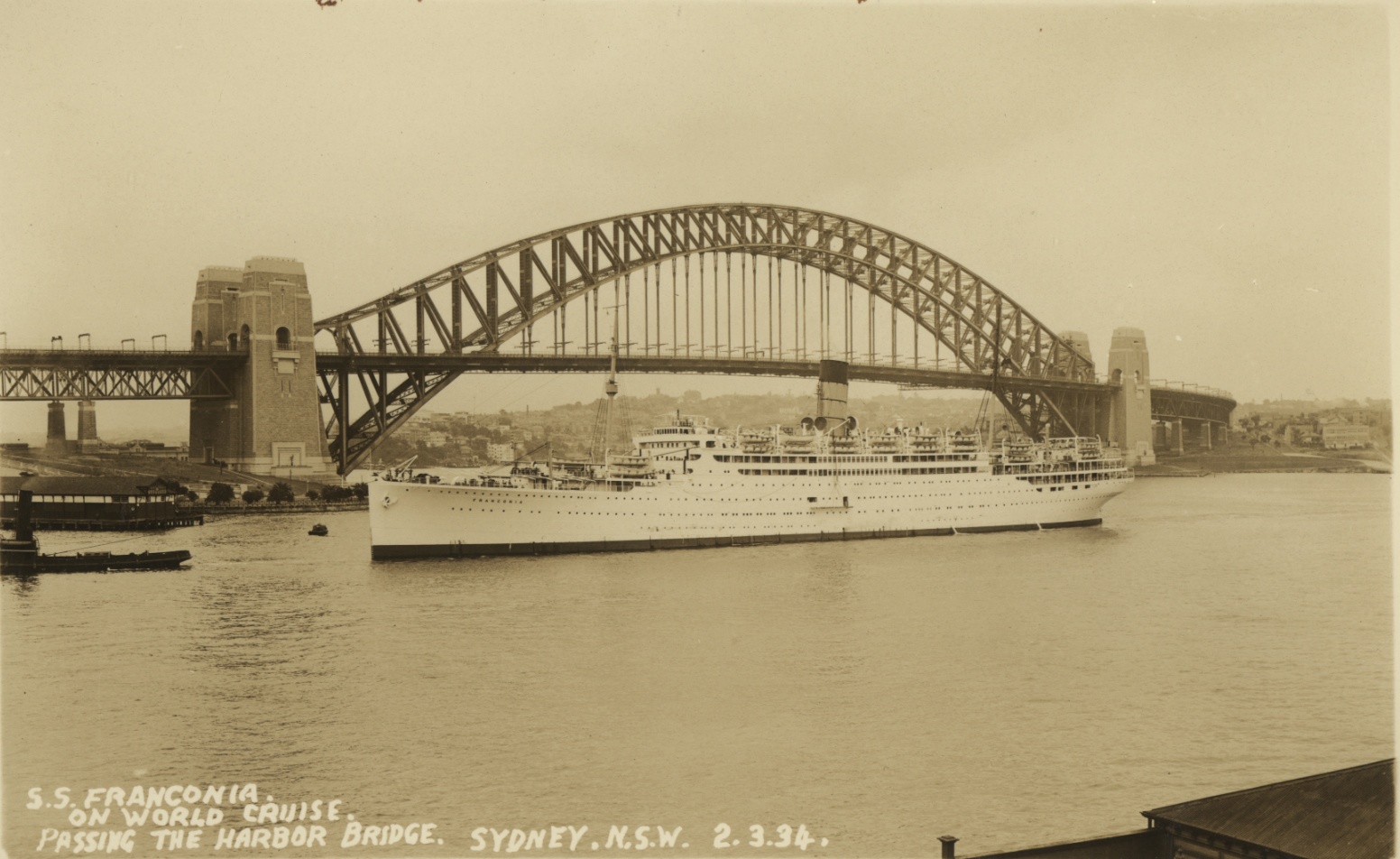
Franconia in Sydney Harbour, 2 March 1934
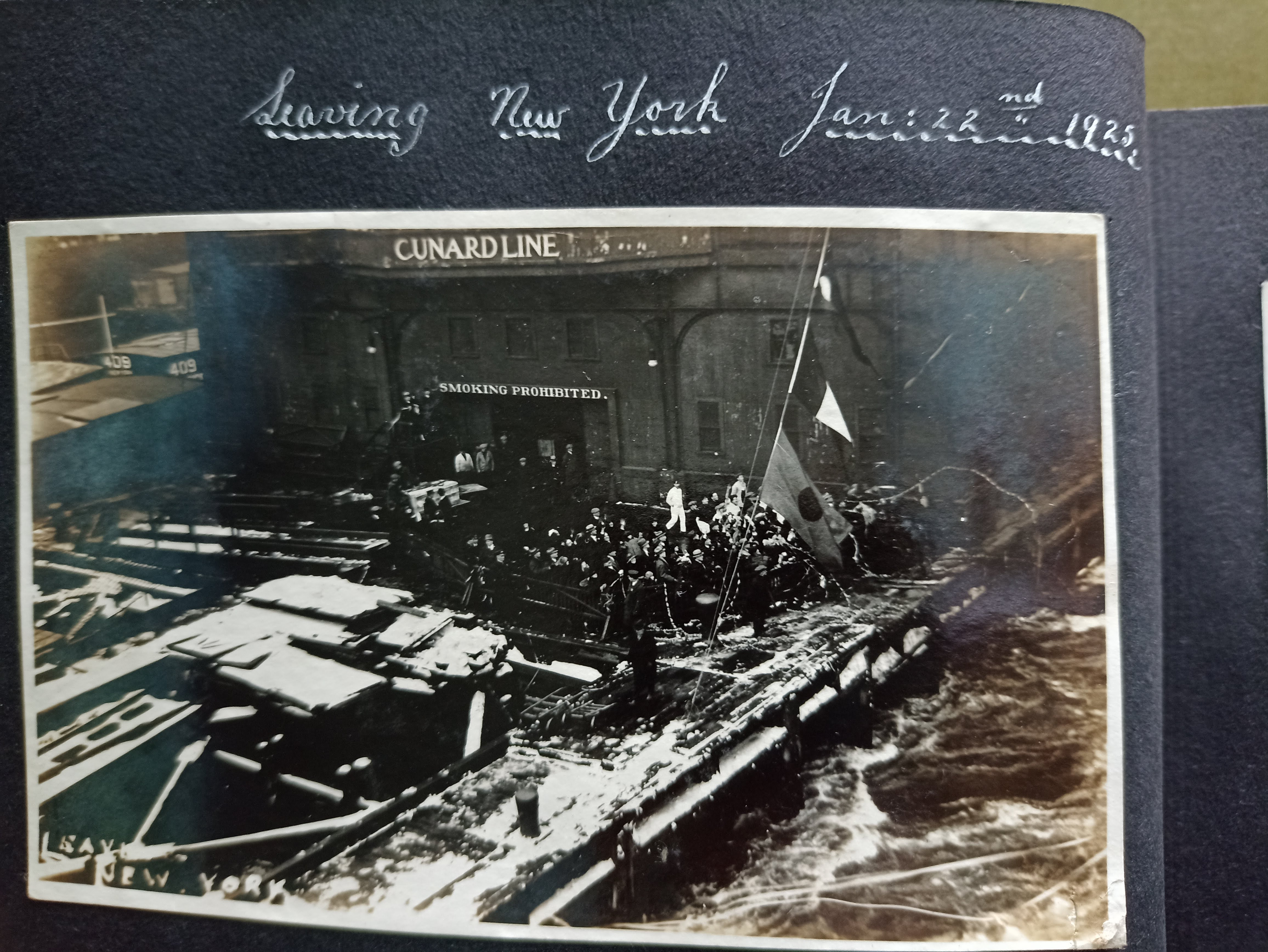

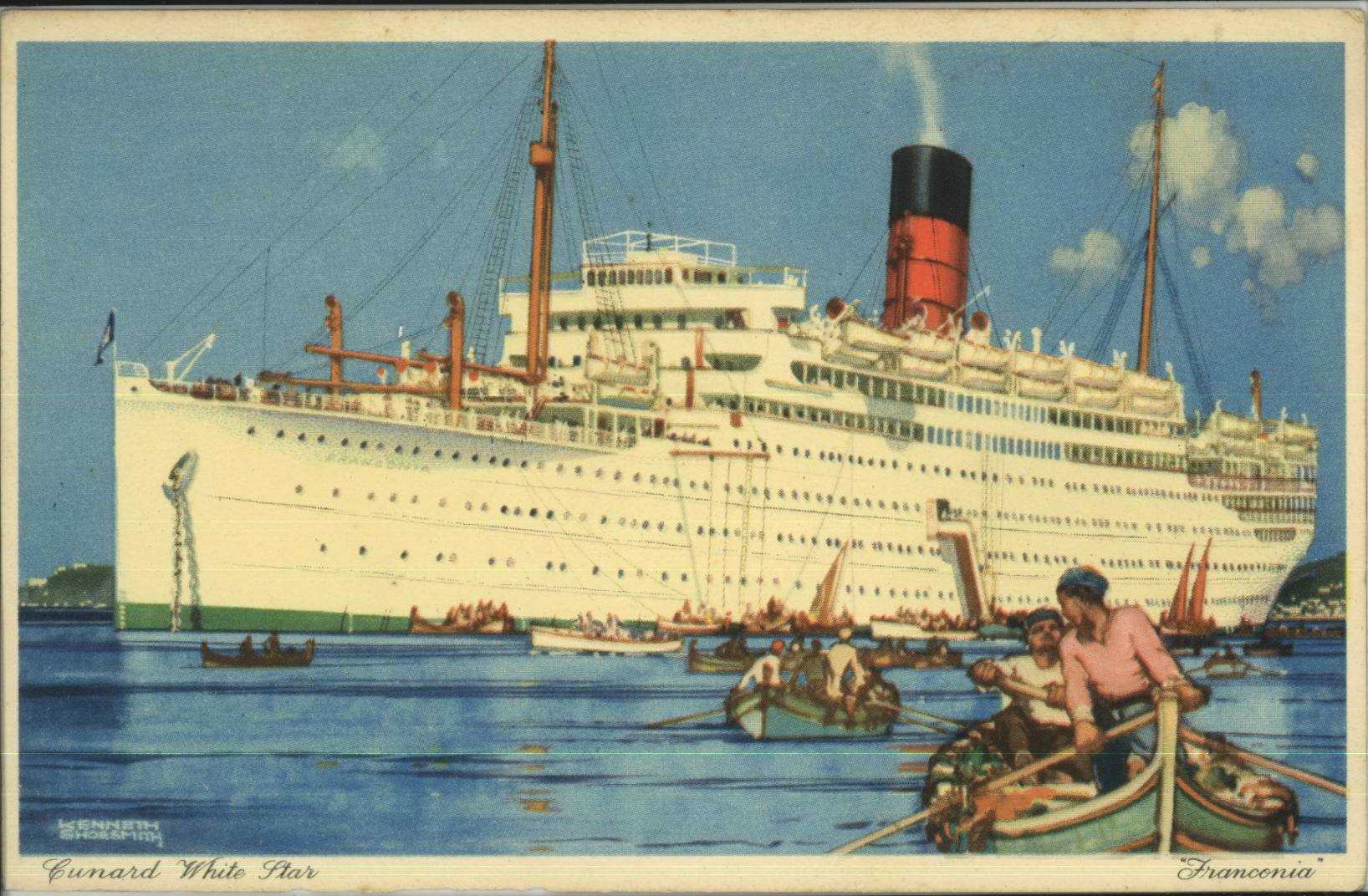
Franconia ca. 1930
