= Sitmar Cruises =

Italian shipping line

Sitmar Line
- Type: Public
- Industry: Transportation
- Founded: 1937
- Founder: Alexandre Vlasov
- Defunct: 1988 (Merged into Princess Cruises
- Fate: Cruise ships (operational and in-build) acquired by P&O
- Headquarters: Monte Carlo, Monaco
- Area served: Europe; Australasia; North America; Central America; South America
- Key people: Boris Vlasov
- Services: Ocean liners Cargo ships Tankers; Migrant ships Cruise ships
- Footnotes House flag of Sitmar Cruises

Sitmar Cruises and its predecessor Sitmar Line were company names derived from the acronym for the Società Italiana Trasporti Marittimi (English: Italian Maritime Transport Company). SITMAR originally was an Italian shipping line founded by Russian émigré Alexandre Vlasov, however the company's headquarters were later transferred to Monaco. Vlasov initially operated cargo services from 1937, gradually replacing these with passenger services from 1947 until 1988, when SITMAR was sold to the Peninsular and Oriental Steam Navigation Company (P&O). After the sale, most of the former SITMAR ships were transferred to the fleet of P&O subsidiary Princess Cruises, while one, TSS Fairstar, became the sole vessel of the newly created P&O-Sitmar Cruises (later P&O Holidays). The only ship originally ordered by SITMAR still sailing, is the MS Ambience for Ambassador Cruise Line.

== Company history ==
SITMAR began when Alexandre Vlasov carried coal in the Mediterranean, using two small cargo ships. During the Second World War, these ships were lost to the company. Vlasov restarted SITMAR after the war and slowly assembled a new fleet of passenger and cargo ships. SITMAR obtained contracts with the International Refugee Organization (IRO) to take refugees from Europe to Australia and other nations.

SITMAR's first vessel to operate services to Australia was the Castelbianco. Amongst the many companies contracted to carry displaced people, SITMAR's vessels were noted for providing higher quality accommodation and food.

During the 1950s, SITMAR became a major passenger shipping company. It offered regular services between Europe and Australia for migrants and full-fare paying passengers. For several years, the company operated voyages between Europe, Central America and South America. Periodically SITMAR also engaged in the seasonal tourist trade between Europe, the United States and Canada.

The Central and South America services, also the North Atlantic summer services, were abandoned by 1957. SITMAR then sold its nominally last cargo vessel, the reefer Fairsky (1), while other V companies such as Silver Line, Italpacific and the Alva Steamship Co maintained the group's extensive cargo ship and oil tanker operations. SITMAR then concentrated on passenger services between Europe and Australasia until the early 1970s, when it also began offering family-oriented cruises from North America, marketed as Sitmar Cruises. Briefly from 1972, in Australia SITMAR entered a line voyage marketing agreement with Shaw Savill Line, named Sea Travel Centres. However, this agreement was short-lived as both partners ceased regular circumnavigations in 1974. The name Sitmar Cruises was subsequently also used in Australia, offering full-time Sydney based cruises, with TSS Fairsky and Fairsky (2).

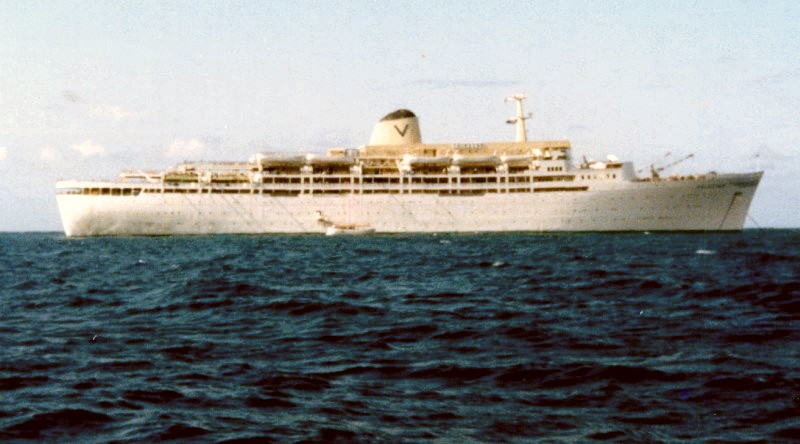
TSS Fairstar

=== New Ships & Rebranding ===
The 1980s brought the orders of the first new ships for Sitmar. In 1984 the lines first newbuild Fairsky debuted. Later in the year, Sitmar would begin negotiations for 3 additional new ships. In December 1985, a letter of intent was signed for two new 798 passenger ships to be built at Fincantieri. Boris Vlasov would take active role in the new ships designs, pulling from his years of experience.

In June 1986 the order was place for the third ship, the new FairMajesty at Chantiers d'Atlantique in France. This ship was scheduled to debut before the other two Italian built sisters. Renderings showed he ship adopting the lines new livery and Swan logo, and have the name prefix Sitmar FairMajesty.

In November 1987, Boris Vlasov died, while a deal being formed to sell Sitmar Cruises to P&O. Sitmar at this time was continuing its rebranding, introducing a new livery, abandoning the "V" logo on the funnel and replacing it with a blue funnel and white "S" swan logo, along with hull art. This new color scheme only ended up being fully applied to the Fairwind while in service, while the FairMajesty and Fairstar only received partial application on the funnel.

=== Sale to P&O ===
In July 1988, Sitmar Cruises' name and ships were purchased by the P&O Group. In Australia, the Fairstar would retain her name, with the operation was renamed P&O-Sitmar Cruises, then in 1991 became P&O Holidays. The majority of Sitmar's operational and under construction fleet were transferred to P&O subsidiary Princess Cruises and renamed, officially ending the era of Sitmar Cruises.

== Fleet history ==
Vlasov operated cargo ships registered under either Greek, Italian or United Kingdom flags before and during the Second World War. SITMAR ships carried a letter "V" on their funnels, for "Vlasov". After the war, Vlasov purchased the former American troop ships Wooster Victory and Vassar Victory, chartering them to the IRO. Wooster Victory first operated under its original name then was renamed Castelverde, while Vassar Victory was immediately renamed Castelbianco. Both vessels were Italian-registered.

After the IRO charter contracts ended in 1952, Castelbianco and Castelverde were extensively rebuilt and used to carry emigrants, initially from Europe to Central America, later from Europe to Australia. This service ended in 1957 and both vessels were sold to the Spanish Line.

Vlasov also bought two war surplus United States Maritime Commission C3 class ships, the first in 1949 being the former escort carrier USS Charger. Austerely refitted to carry 1800 passengers, this vessel became Fairsea (1) under Panamanian registry. Fairsea (1) was used for a series of IRO and other refugee organisations' charters, including voyages to Australia and North America. Another passenger vessel, Castel Felice – completed in 1931 as SS Kenya for the British-India Steam Navigation Company – was acquired in the late 1940s and after refurbishment joined the SITMAR fleet in 1952, seeing duty in a number of markets.

From 1955 until 1970 SITMAR won successive five-year contracts from the Australian government to carry British emigrants from Southampton to Australia under the Assisted Passage Scheme. These commenced in December 1955 using the extensively refitted Fairsea (1). In 1957 the arrangement was expanded, so SITMAR arranged for the conversion of their idle other C3 design ship, Castel Forte, formerly the escort carrier HMS Attacker. Castel Forte received major structural alterations for her new role in New York in 1957, transferring to Italy at the end of that year for internal fitting-out. As Fairsky (2), the ship joined the Australian migration service from Southampton in May 1958. Eventually Castel Felice – and still later TSS Fairstar, formerly the British troopship Oxfordshire purchased from Bibby Line in 1963 – from 1964 also operated migrant voyages between England and Australia until 1970, when Chandris Lines instead won the migrant contract.

In 1968 Vlasov purchased the Cunard liners Carinthia and Sylvania, intending for them to replace Castel Felice and Fairsea (1). However, after 15 years' continuous service, SITMAR's bid to retain the 1970 UK-Australia migration contract was unsuccessful. The two former Cunarders, since renamed Fairland and Fairwind, were laid-up at Southampton until reactivated prior to refurbishment in late 1970 and early 1971. The pair received major refits in tandem at the San Marco shipyards in Trieste. From 1972, SITMAR successfully built a fine reputation in the North American cruise market with Fairsea (2) (previously Fairland) and Fairwind. Fairsea (1) was scrapped in 1969 after a disabling engine-room fire, while the veteran Castel Felice was scrapped in 1970, following the loss of the Australian contract.

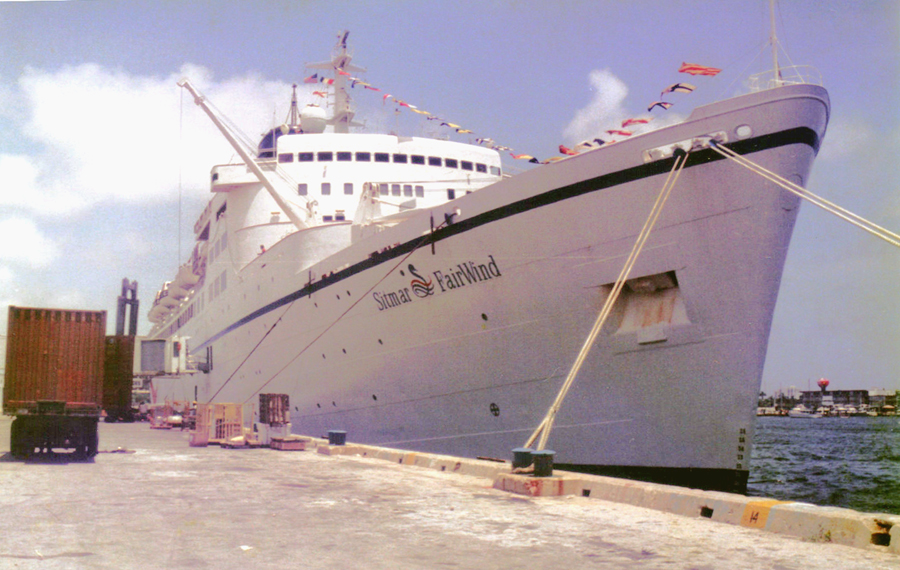
Sitmar Fairwind moored in Miami's harbor on August 3, 1988 with new livery

Operating from Australia as a full-time cruise ship since 1974, Fairsky (2) was sold in 1977 after a collision, so the company sought a larger vessel to replace it. SITMAR failed to secure the Queen Anna Maria, which was bought by Carnival Cruise Lines. In 1979 SITMAR instead bought the Portuguese ship Principe Perfeito and renamed it Fairsky (3), intending to convert the vessel in Spain. However, the conversion was deemed uneconomic and the ship was sold in 1982 to John Latsis.

=== New-builds ===
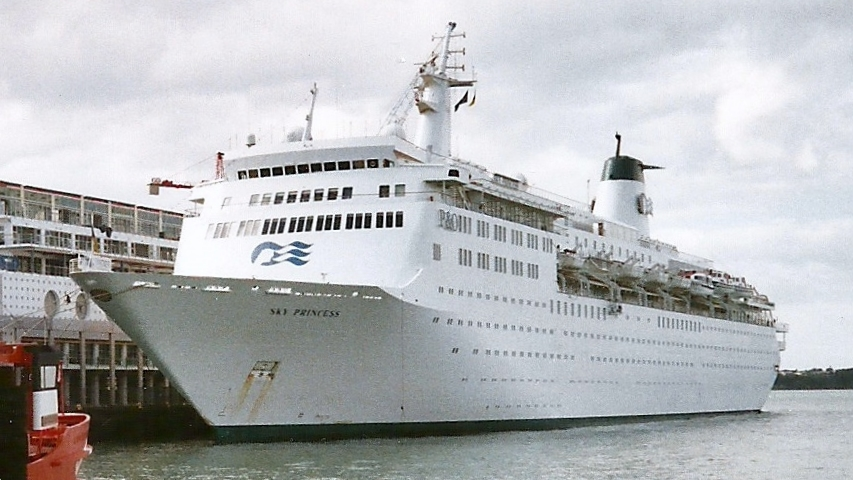
Fairsky as the Sky Princess, Sitmar's first newbuild

SITMAR who had traditional converted older passenger ships, decided on its first new-build, the Fairsky (4). Built by Chantiers de l'Atlantique at Saint Nazaire, France, Fairsky (4) entered service for the North American market in 1984. In 1988 this became Sky Princess for Princess Cruises, then Pacific Sky for P&O Cruises Australia. Next sold to the Spanish operator Pullmantur Cruises, the ship was renamed Sky Wonder, later becoming Atlantic Star. After a prolonged lay-up in Marseille, France, this fuel-hungry turbine steamship was sold for scrap in 2013, being its 29th year.

A second new build was ordered and built by Chantiers de l'Atlantique, at their shipyard in Saint-Nazaire, France, and launched in 1988 as Sitmar Fair Majesty. Originally ordered for Sitmar Cruises, however with the merger of Sitmar Cruises into Princess, she first entered service with Princess Cruises as Star Princess in 1989.

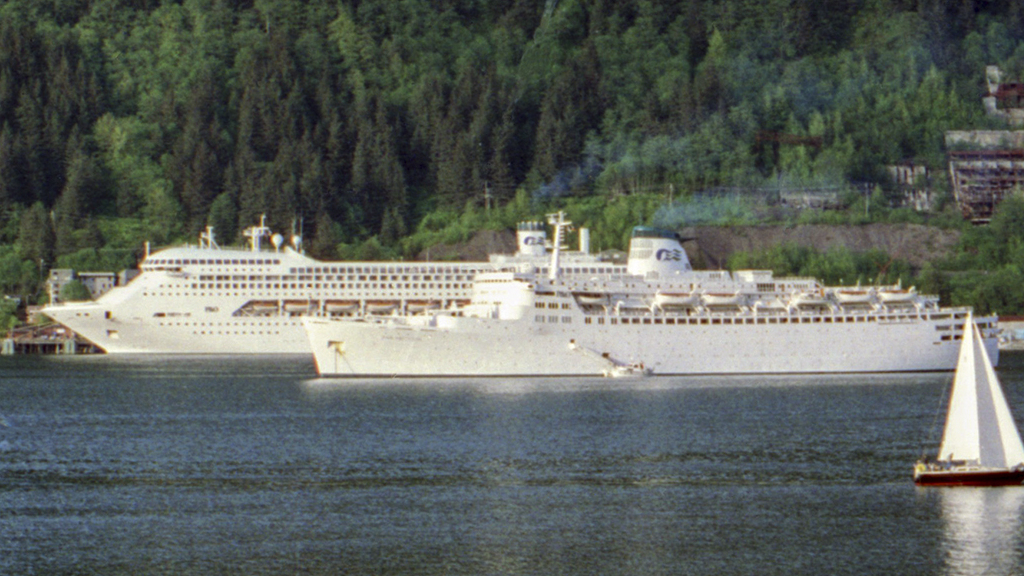
The Sitmar Cruises fleet in 1996 after the Sitmar Cruises Ships, P&O transferred them to Princess Cruises.

A pair of approximately 70,000 GT cruise ships were also ordered by SITMAR in the mid-1980s, but still under construction when P&O bought the cruise line. Built by Fincantieri at Monfalcone, Italy, to external designs by Renzo Piano, these vessels entered service as Crown Princess (July 1990) and Regal Princess (August 1991). Both then operated for P&O Cruises Australia, the former as Pacific Jewel and the latter as Pacific Dawn. Pacific Jewel would sail briefly as Karnika before being sold for scrap in 2020. While Pacific Dawn was intended to sail as Amy Johnson for Cruise & Maritime Voyages, those plans would fall through and was resold to become a floating residence, named Satoshi. Those plans also fell through, and the ship became the Ambience for Ambassador Cruise Line, the last operating ship of the former brand SITMAR.

== SITMAR Passenger fleet ==
Name	Image	Built	Years in Service for Sitmar	Status	Notes
Fairsea		1941	(1949–1969)	Scrapped 1969	Built as the USS Charger (CVE-30) as an escort carrier for the United States Navy
Castelbianco		1945	(1952–1957)	Scrapped	Built in 1945 as Vassar Victory, named Castelbianco in 1947, renamed Castel Bianco in 1952, renamed Begona in 1957.
Castel Felice		1931	(1952–1970)	Scrapped 1970	Built for the British India Company as the Kenya
Castel Verde		1945	(1953–1957)	Scrapped	Previously named Castelverde and Wooster Victory built in 1945
Fairsky		1941	(1958–1977)	Scrapped	Previously named Castel Forte
Fairstar		1957	(1964–1988)	Scrapped as Fairstar in 1997	Built as the Oxfordshire in 1957, retained name Fairstar under new P&O ownership until retirement in 1997
Fairwind		1957	(1968–1988)	Scrapped in 2004 as Albatross	Renamed Sitmar Fairwind in 1988, became Fair Princess when line was taken over by P&O
Fairsea (2)		1956	(1971–1988)	Scrapped in 2005	Originally to be named Fairland, became Dawn Princess when line was taken over by P&O
Fairsky		1984	(1984–1988)	Scrapped in 2013	One of the last large steamships built. Became the Sky Princess when line was taken over by P&O
Sitmar FairMajesty		1988	(1988) Never entering service for Sitmar Cruises	Scrapped in 2021	Ordered and designed for Sitmar, launched with new Sitmar livery, transferred to Princess Cruises right after completion to become Star Princess
Unnamed Newbuild (Crown Princess)		1990	Transferred before entering service	Scrapped in 2021	Ordered and designed for Sitmar, transferred to Princess Cruises before completion
Unnamed Newbuild (Regal Princess)		1991	Transferred before entering service	In service	Ordered and designed for Sitmar, transferred to Princess Cruises before completion

== Sitmar Legacy ==
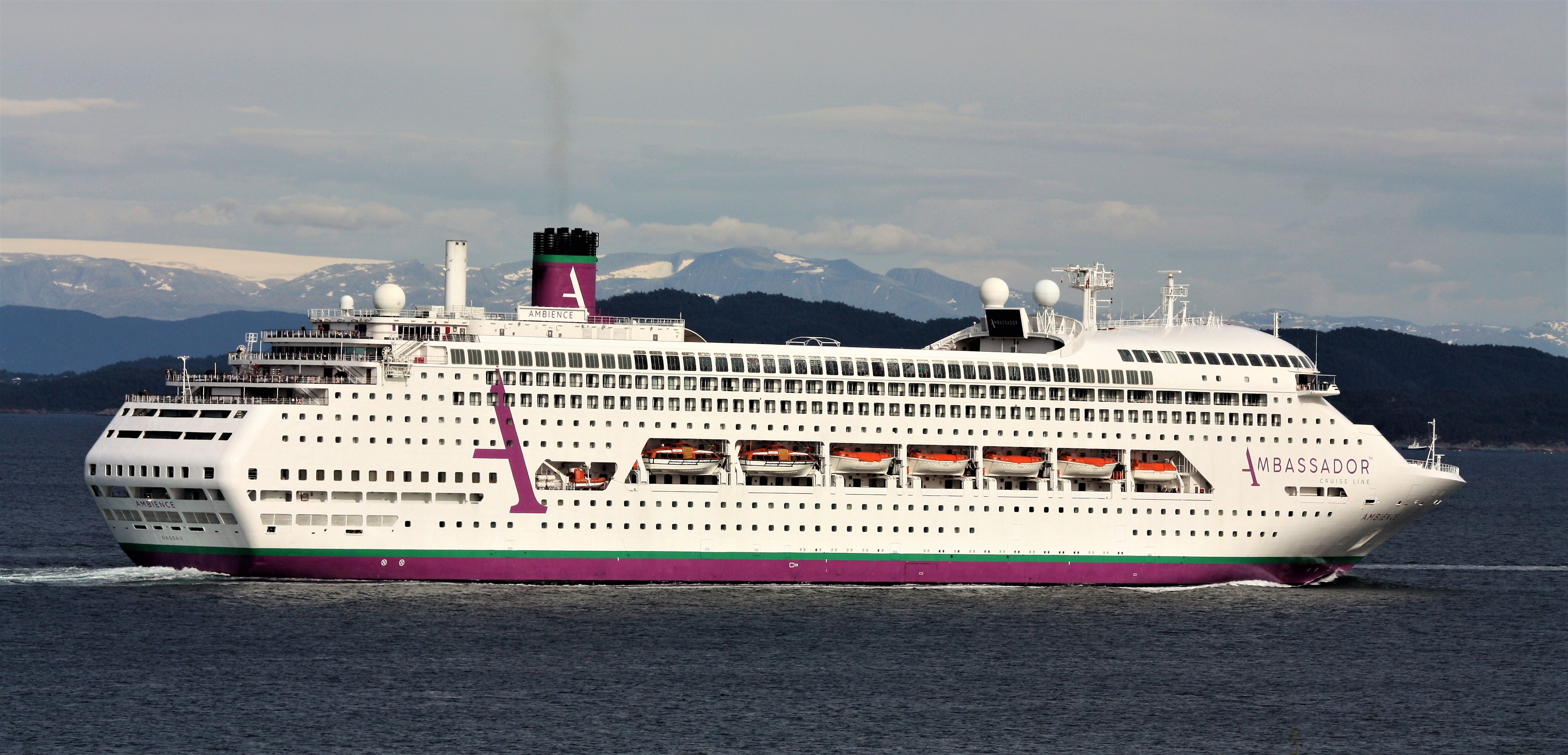
The Ambience, the last ordered ship for Sitmar that is still sailing

The Vlasov Group, now renamed V-Ships, helped found Silversea Cruises in 1994 by a joint venture between V-Ships of Monaco and Antonio Lefebvre d'Ovidio of Rome. The joint owners had previously been the co-owners of Sitmar Cruises. V Ships and the D'Ovidio family operated Silversea Cruises until taken over by Royal Caribbean Group in July 2020.

=== Last surviving Ship ===
The former Regal Princess, one of the pair of ships originally ordered and designed for Sitmar, and operated for Princess Cruises, before being operated for P&O Cruises Australia, as Pacific Dawn. She was intended to sail as Amy Johnson for Cruise & Maritime Voyages, those plans would fall through and was resold to become a floating residence, named Satoshi. Those plans also fell through, and the ship became the Ambience for Ambassador Cruise Line, and is the last operating ship designed for the former SITMAR line.
