= SS Príncipe Perfeito =

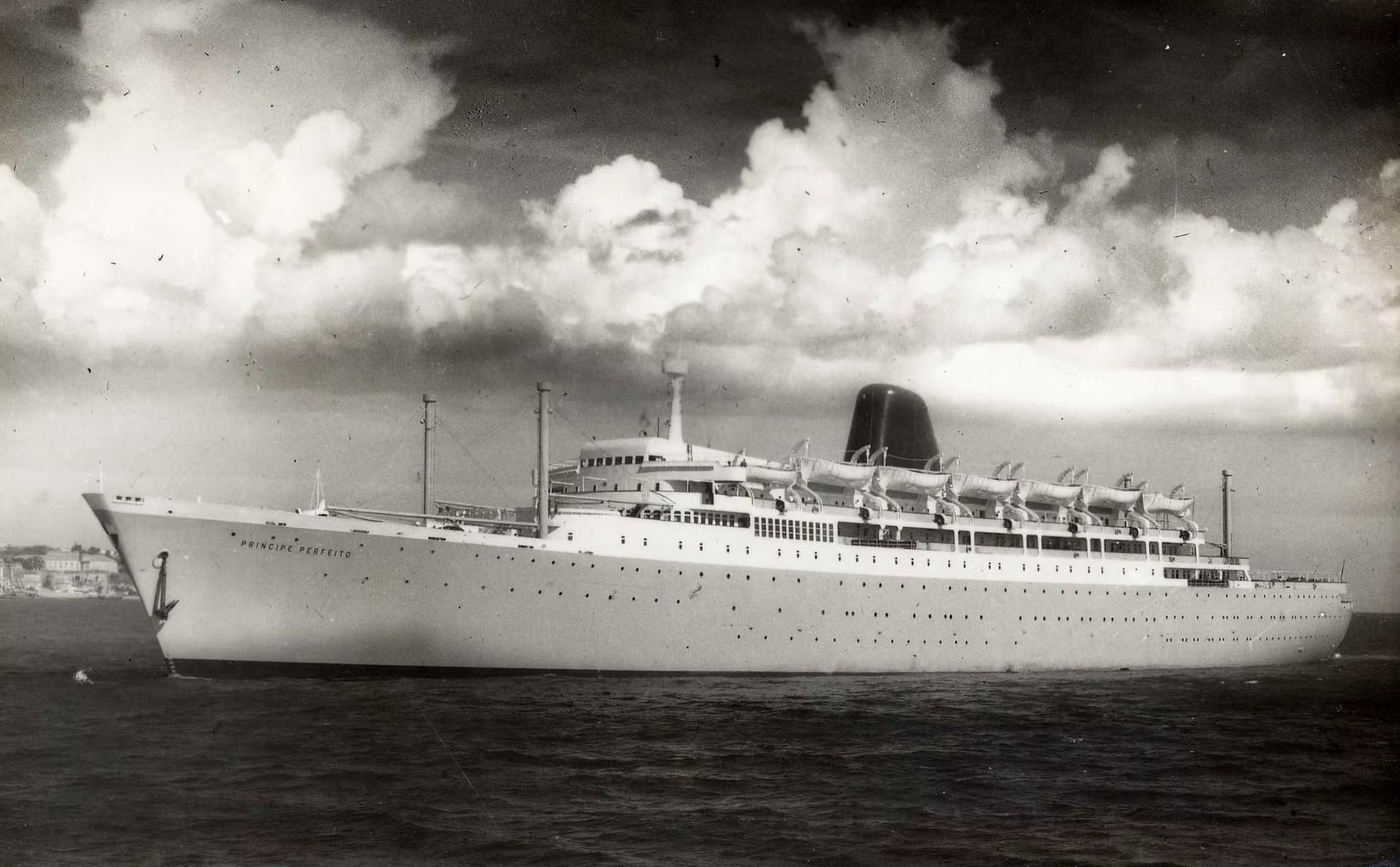

History

Portugal
- Name: 1961-1976: Príncipe Perfeito; 1976-1980: Al Hasa; 1980: Fairsky; 1981: Vera; 1982-1984: Marianna IX; 1984-2001: Marianna 9; 2001: Mariann 9
- Namesake: John II of Portugal, the Perfect Prince
- Owner: Companhia Nacional de Navegação
- Operator: Companhia Nacional de Navegação
- Port of registry: Lisbon, Portugal, H-476
- Builder: Swan Hunter
- Launched: September 22, 1960
- Christened: September 22, 1960
- In service: June 27, 1961
- Out of service: June 2001
- Identification: IMO number: 5285045
- Fate: Broken up at Alang 2001

General characteristics
- Type: Passenger liner
- Tonnage: 19,393 grt
- Length: 586.5 feet (178.8 m)
- Beam: 78.6 feet (24.0 m)
- Draught: 25.5 feet (7.8 m)
- Installed power: 2 Parsons steam turbines with 21,000 hp
- Propulsion: 2 propellers
- Speed: 20 knots
- Capacity: 200 (first class); 800 (tourist class)
- Crew: 320

SS Príncipe Perfeito was a passenger ship built in 1961 by Swan Hunter for the Companhia Nacional de Navegação, often abbreviated as CNN.

== History ==
The first voyage of Príncipe Perfeito, which began in Lisbon to Africa with calls at nine different ports (Funchal, São Tomé, Luanda, Lobito, Moçâmedes, Cape Town, Lourenço Marques) and then ended at Beira Harbour, was a run that would become her usual voyage.

On July 6, 1964, the Príncipe Perfeito transported the president of the Portuguese Republic, Americo Tomas in an official trip to Mozambique.

During her service years with her original owners, the Principe Perfeito was generally used for passenger service or troop transport, making cruises only occasionally. During the 1960s, armed campaigns for independence in Portugal's African colonies (notably Guinea-Bissau, Angola and Mozambique) started, leading to demand for troopships as Portugal's government led by António de Oliveira Salazar attempted (unsuccessfully) to crush the insurrections.

In 1974, the CNN merged with three other major shipping companies, Companhia de Navegação Carregadores Açorianos, Companhia Colonial de Navegação and Empresa Insulana de Navegação to form the Companhia Portuguesa de Transportes Marítimos, or CTM. This move was made in order to streamline operations during the 1973 oil crisis and due to severe competition from airlines. Despite this major change she continued her original route. The Carnation Revolution of 1974 and the subsequent granting of independence to the colonies in 1975, Principe Perfeito was laid up at Lisbon in 1976.

That April she was sold to the Panamanian company Global Transportation Incorporated, who sent her back to her builders with the intention of converting Principe Perfeito into the accommodation ship Al Hasa.

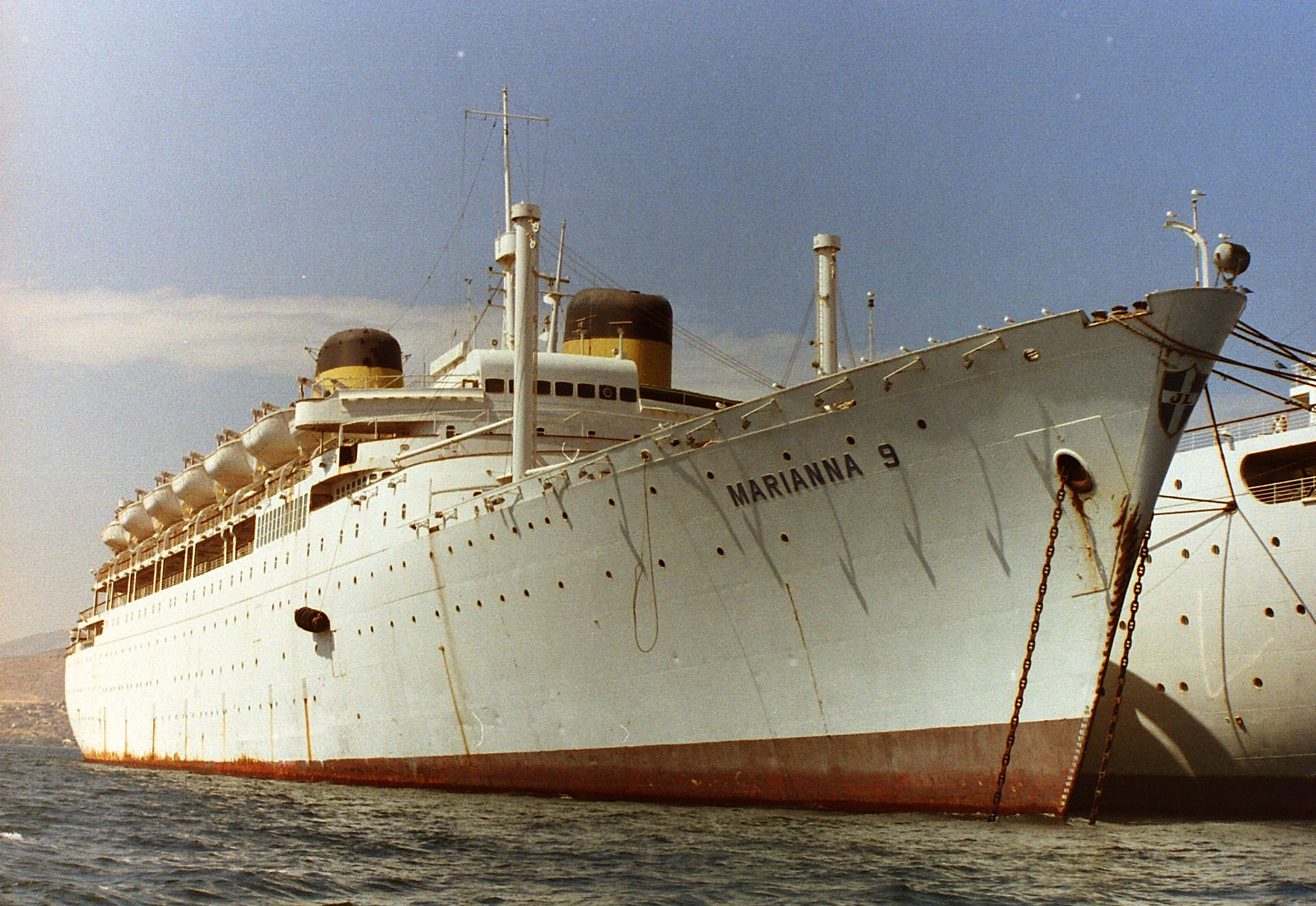
Marianna 9 laid up in Eleusis, 2000

These plans never materialized and ownership of the vessel was passed on to the Sitmar Line, who renamed Fairsky with the intent of rebuilding her into a cruise ship, as they did with the SS Fairwind. However the company decided to build an entirely new ship (resulting in the Fairsky of 1984). With this decision Sitmar renamed her Vera in 1981. She was sold to the John Latsis company Bilinder Marine Corporation in 1982, who renamed her Marianna IX after one of his daughters. She entered a new role as an accommodation ship at Jeddah and then Rabigh. In 1984 her name was changed to Marianna 9. She was sent to Kalamata to house earthquake victims in 1986, but was later returned to Rabigh. In 1992 she was laid up at Eleusis alongside the RMS Windsor Castle. She remained there until 2001 when she was sent to the scrapyards at Alang, India.
