= Liliana Gasinskaya =

Person who escaped from the Soviet Union

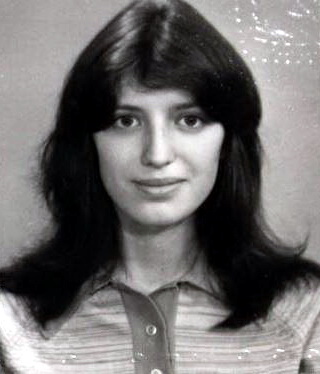
Liliana Gasinskaya

Liliana Leonidovna Gasinskaya (Russian: Лилиана Леонидовна Гасинская; Ukrainian: Ліліана Леонідівна Гасинська, Liliana Leonidivna Hasynska, born July 21, 1960) is a woman who defected from the Soviet Union in 1979. On board a Soviet cruise ship, SS Leonid Sobinov (Black Sea Shipping Company), in Sydney Harbour, Gasinskaya slipped out of a porthole wearing only a red bikini (earning her the nickname "The Girl in the Red Bikini").

She was born in 1960 in Alchevsk in Luhansk Oblast, Ukrainian SSR to a musician father and actress mother, but later moved to Odesa. When Gasinskaya was 14, she decided to attempt to leave the USSR and thus graduated from the Odesa Marine Tourism Service Vocational School with the qualification of a ship waitress. She was then assigned to work at the Black Sea Shipping Company. She became a cleaner on the Leonid Sobinov.

After swimming ashore in the evening of January 14, 1979, she was sheltered by Bill Green, a photographer at Sydney University. Gasinskaya was later nearly apprehended by staff from the Soviet embassy, but managed to hide from them with the help of journalists from The Daily Mirror, which subsequently interviewed her. A debate ensued over whether then Immigration Minister Michael MacKellar should grant Gasinskaya asylum or deport her, as was customary for other ship deserters. Despite her unspecified claims of repression, which one commentator sneered may have been "the shops in Russia are boring", she was allowed to remain.

She later earned $15,000 as the first nude centerfold in Australia's edition of Penthouse magazine.
