= Saxonia-class ocean liner =

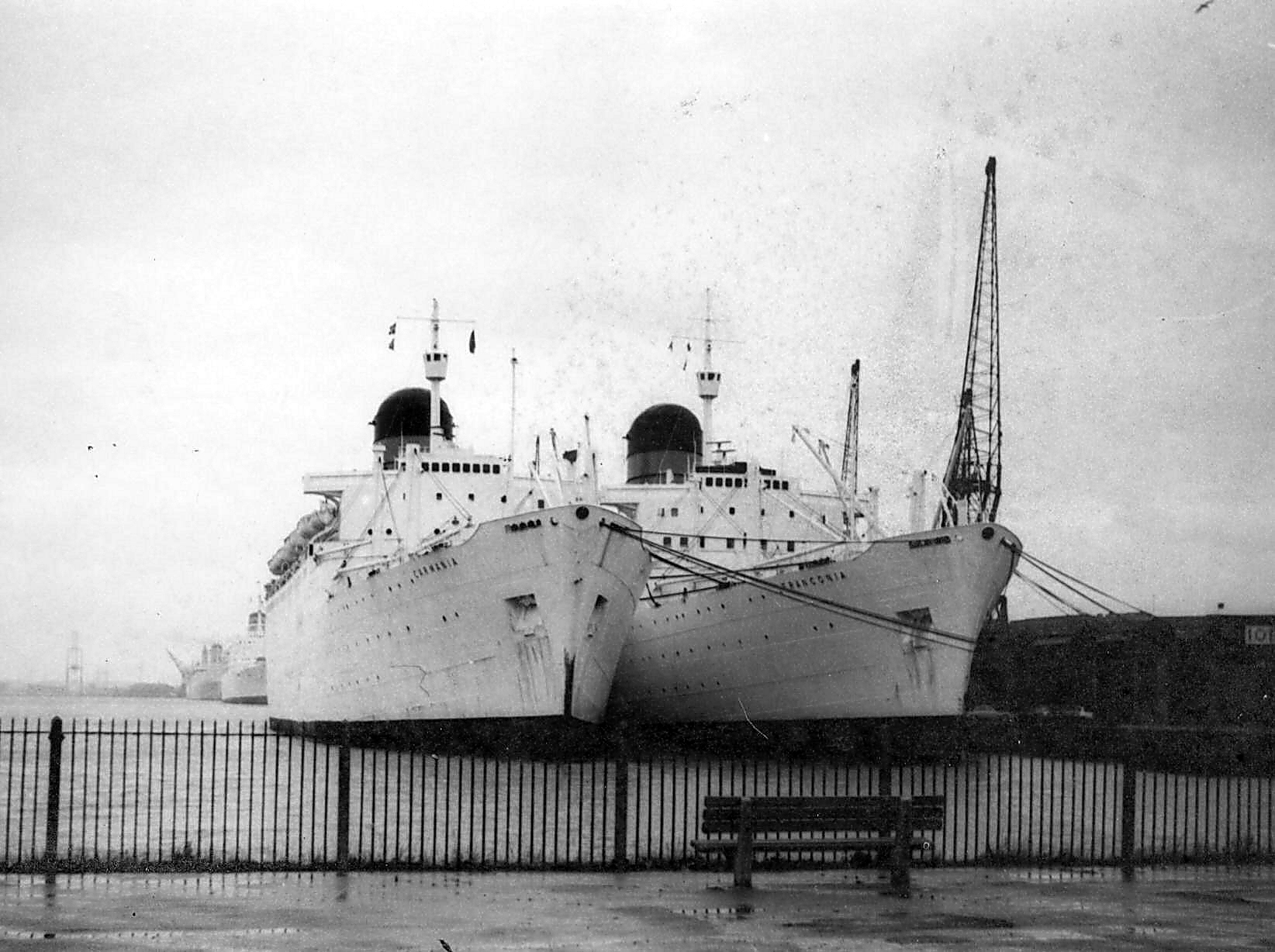
- Saxonia-class ships laid up at Southampton.

General characteristics (as built)
- Type: Ocean liner
- Tonnage: 21,946 GRT
- Length: 185.40 m (608 ft 3 in)
- Beam: 24.39 m (80 ft 0 in)
- Draught: 8.70 m (28 ft 7 in)
- Installed power: 4 × John Brown steam turbines; Combined 18,277 kW (24,510 hp)
- Propulsion: Two propellers
- Speed: 25 knots (46 km/h; 29 mph) maximum
- Capacity: 868 passengers
- Crew: 461

The Saxonia class was a class of four ocean liners, originally operated by Cunard Line for transatlantic voyages between the United Kingdom and Canada.

== Concept and construction ==
Towards the end of 1951 Cunard Line designed new ships for Canadian service on the Liverpool–Montreal–Halifax route. Cunard ordered four ships: RMS Saxonia, RMS Ivernia, RMS Carinthia, and RMS Sylvania. The Saxonia-class ships were the largest ships to be operated to Canada at the time. The ships were built at Clydebank and they were designed for luxury and speed including carrying passengers and cargo up the St. Lawrence River in summer and in Halifax in the winter, when the St. Lawrence River froze.

== Service history ==
List of Saxonia-class ships
Saxonia	completed 1954	Out of service 1995	Scrapped 1999
Ivernia	completed 1955	Out of service 1995	Scrapped 2004
Carinthia	completed 1956	Out of service 2003	Scrapped 2005
Sylvania	completed 1957	Out of service 2003	Scrapped 2004

Saxonia and Ivernia were extensively rebuilt in 1962–1963 as transatlantic liners /cruise ships. They were renamed Carmania and Franconia respectively.

In the 1970s, Saxonia and Ivernia were later sold to the USSR as cruise ships, while Carinthia and Sylvania continued their careers also as cruise ships for various shipping lines until the early 2000s.
