= RMS Sylvania =

Ocean liner/cruise ship (1956–2004)

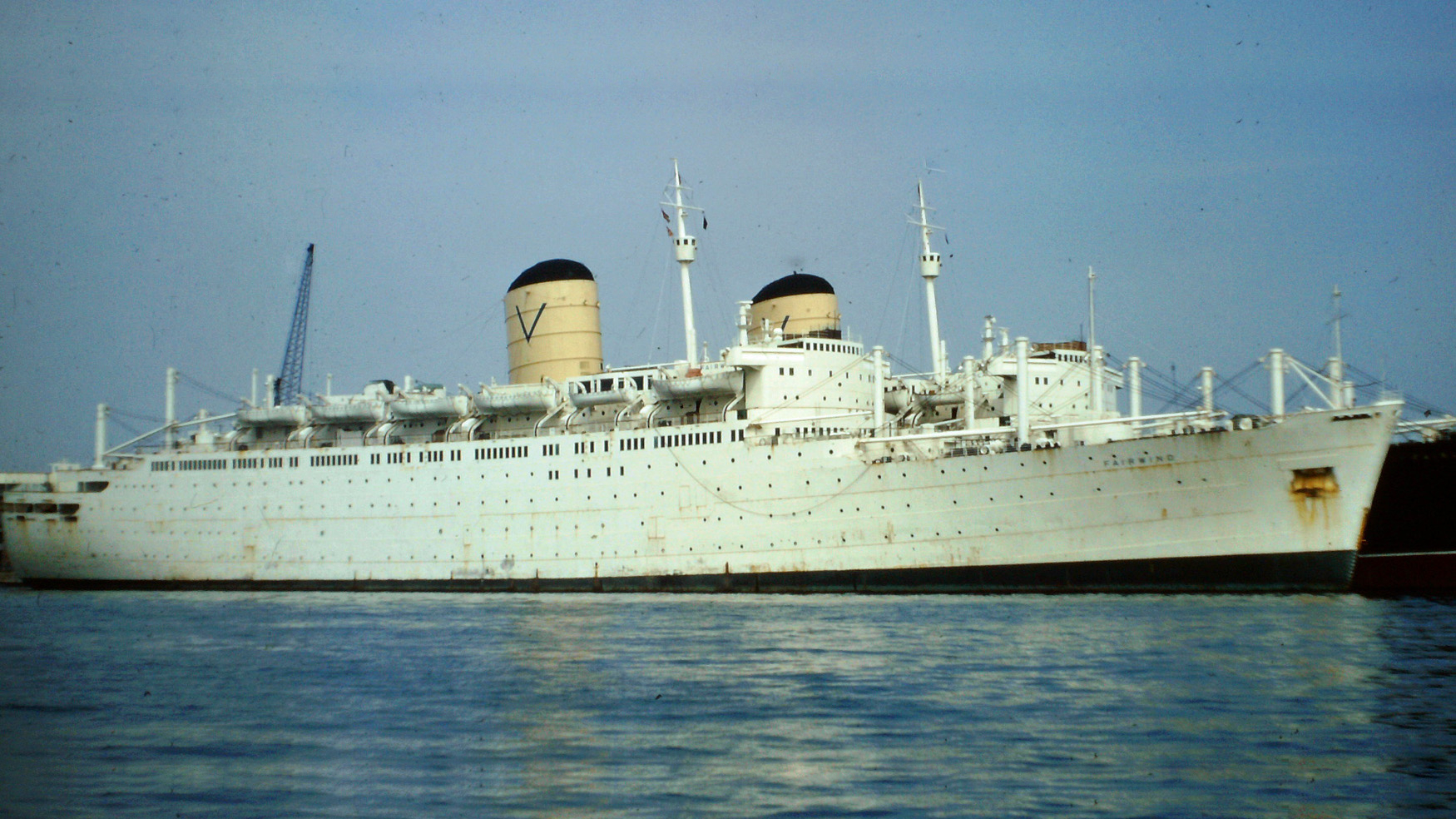
- Fairwind and Fairsea laid up at Southampton in August 1969

History
- Name: 1957–1968: Sylvania; 1968–1988: Fairwind; 1988: Sitmar Fairwind; 1988–1993: Dawn Princess; 1993–2003: Albatros; 2003–2004: Genoa
- Owner: 1957–1968: Cunard; 1968–1988: Sitmar Line; 1988–1993: P&O; 1993–2003: V-Ships
- Operator: 1957–1968: Cunard; 1968–1970: laid up; 1970–1988: Sitmar Line; 1988–1993: Princess Cruises; 1993–2003: Phoenix Reisen
- Port of registry: 1957–1968: Liverpool, United Kingdom; 1968–1993: Monrovia, Liberia; 1993–2003: Nassau, Bahamas
- Builder: John Brown & Company, Glasgow, Scotland
- Yard number: 700
- Launched: 22 November 1956
- Acquired: June 1957
- Maiden voyage: 5 June 1957
- In service: 5 June 1957
- Out of service: December 2003
- Identification: IMO number: 5347245
- Fate: Scrapped at Alang, India, 2004

General characteristics (as built)
- Class & type: Saxonia class ocean liner
- Tonnage: 21,989 GRT; 8,500 DWT
- Length: 185.40 m (608 ft 3 in)
- Beam: 24.49 m (80 ft 4 in)
- Draught: 8.90 m (29 ft 2 in)
- Installed power: 4 × John Brown steam turbines, combined 18277 kW
- Propulsion: Two propellers
- Speed: 21 kn (39 km/h; 24 mph) service speed
- Capacity: 878 passengers (154 first class, 724 tourist class)

General characteristics (after 1971 refit)
- Type: Cruise ship
- Tonnage: 24,724 GRT
- Decks: 11
- Capacity: 925 passengers
- Crew: 330

RMS Sylvania was an ocean liner built in 1957 by John Brown & Company, in Glasgow, Scotland for Cunard. She was the last Cunard vessel built specifically for transatlantic crossings. The ship was later heavily rebuilt as a cruise ship, and sailed under the names SS Fairwind, SS Sitmar Fairwind, SS Dawn Princess and SS Albatros before being scrapped in 2004. She was renamed SS Genoa for her last voyage.

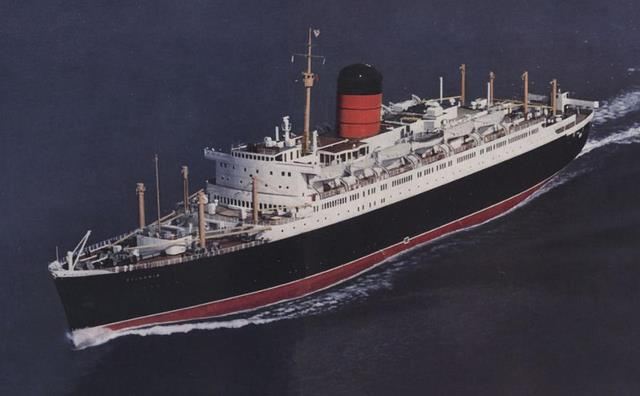
Sylvania before her 1971 refit

== Concept and construction ==
In addition to the more prestigious Transatlantic service from Southampton to New York, Cunard also operated other services, including one from Liverpool to Montreal, Canada. On the Canadian run their main competitors were Canadian Pacific Steamships. In order to strengthen their position on this service, Cunard decided to order a series of four identical liners in 1951.

The new ships reflected the economics and travel patterns of the post-war world—they were not built exclusively as passenger liners, but also included cargo-carrying facilities. Their passenger accommodation were divided into just two classes, first and tourist, with the tourist class occupying the majority of the ship. The outer dimensions of the ships were defined by the Saint Lawrence Seaway, as they had to be able to navigate from the Atlantic Ocean up to Montreal.

The construction of the new ships, eventually referred to as the Saxonia class after the first ship, was awarded to the John Brown & Company shipyard at Clydebank in Glasgow, Scotland. The first ship, RMS Saxonia was delivered in 1954, with RMS Ivernia following in 1955, RMS Carinthia in 1956, and finally Sylvania in 1957. As was the tradition for Cunard Line vessels, all ships were named after Latin names of provinces of the Roman and Holy Roman Empires.

Sylvania was rebuilt once during her service with Cunard Line, in 1965 when she was rebuilt into a more cruise-friendly configuration by the addition of en suite facilities to many of her cabins. In 1970–1971 the ship – by now named Fairwind – received a more extensive rebuilding for cruise service at Arsenale Triestino San Marco, Trieste, Italy, with her superstructure and funnel radically rebuilt and interiors re-styled to fit the tastes of the North American cruise passengers.

== Design ==
=== Exterior design ===
The Saxonia-class ships were built to a classic ocean liner appearance, with a black hull, long bow, slightly rounded terraced forward superstructure and a tiered aft superstructure. However, they lacked the traditional outward projecting promenade deck and had an unusual funnel with a rounded top. Due to their cargo-carrying capabilities, there were four large cranes on both the bow and aft deck.

At some point of her career, Sylvania's hull was re-painted white.

During the 1970–71 refit the ship's external appearance was radically altered, with the forward superstructure rebuilt to a sleek, streamlined form, the funnel rebuilt to a more modern, slightly conical form with a smoke deflector fin on top, and the cargo cranes eliminated. In keeping with the then-current Sitmar Line livery, Fairwind had a buff funnel with a large V (for Vlasov) painted on it. In addition to the funnel, the topmost decks of her superstructure and her radar mast were painted buff.

In 1988 Sitmar Fairwind received the new Sitmar livery with an entirely white superstructure, a dark blue funnel with Sitmar's new Swan logo, and three wave-like ribands painted on her hull. Alongside Fairstar she was the only ship to receive the short-lived new Sitmar livery.

After moved to Princess Cruises and renamed Dawn Princess, the ship received the all-white Princess livery, with only the top of her funnel painted dark blue, and Princess' wave logo attached to the funnel. In Phoenix Reisen service her funnel was painted turquoise with a black top, with Phoenix's seagull-and-sun logo attached. Additionally a turquoise decorative stripe was painted on her hull.

=== Interior design ===
Sylvania, like her sisters, was originally built with a general arrangement of three cargo holds located both aft and forward of the superstructure, the passenger spaces located between them, with tourist class dominating the passenger spaces. Despite the dominance of the tourist class, her interiors were built to the elegant standards maintained by Cunard on their previous ships. Notable public spaces included a cinema with a balcony and even a soda fountain. The ship was also built with full air-conditioning.

The public spaces were also altered radically in the 1970–71 refit, with three swimming pools added to the rear decks, and the accommodations brought up to the high standards expected by the North American cruise passengers. After the refit her facilities included a theatre, five lounges and three restaurants.

== Service history ==
=== 1957–1968: Sylvania ===
Sylvania started on her maiden voyage from Greenock to Montreal on 5 June 1957. On 26 June 1957 she joined her sisters on their Northern Hemisphere summer service from Liverpool to Montreal via Greenock and Québec. By the time she entered service the growth of passenger numbers in transatlantic liner service had ceased, while the number of passengers transported by the jet airplane was growing. In 1958 the Saxonia made one crossing from Liverpool to New York via Cobh and Halifax. In April 1961 she was moved permanently to the Liverpool—New York service, replacing MV Britannic. At some point during her career with Cunard, Sylvania also served on the Rotterdam—Southampton—Le Havre—Québec—Montreal route and winter crossings between Liverpool and Halifax via Greenock.

When the North Atlantic passenger operation became unprofitable in the early sixties, Sylvania was used on more and more cruises. In early 1965 she received a refit to make her accommodations more cruise-friendly (though this was not as extensive as the refits given to her sisters Saxonia and Ivernia). In November 1966 her transatlantic service was altered back to the Liverpool—Montreal route.

Between 24 February and 10 May 1967, Sylvania carried British Hovercraft Corporation's SRN-6 type hovercraft 024 on board during her cruises on the Mediterranean from Gibraltar. The hovercraft was used to run trips from the ship to various ports along the cruises. The experiment proved unsuccessful and was not repeated. On 15 June 1967, she was on a regular run from Montreal to Southampton when she ran aground on a shoal in the St. Lawrence River roughly 10 nautical miles (19 km; 12 mi) from Trois-Rivières, Quebec. After efforts to free the ship failed, the sailing was cancelled and the roughly 550 passengers aboard were given the option of continuing their journey via air travel or transferring to the passenger liner Empress of England which had anchored nearby. The passengers were disembarked via tenders and an oil tanker was dispatched to lighten Sylvania by removing oil from her fuel tanks. Sylvania was eventually freed on 18 June. Sylvania then returned to Montreal for inspection. Due to heavy losses Cunard withdrew Sylvania and her sister ship Carinthia from service in December 1967. They were subsequently laid up in Southampton and put up for sale.

=== 1968–1988: Fairwind ===
On 2 February 1968 Sylvania and Carinthia were sold to the Italy-based Sitmar Line. The sisters were re-registered to Liberia and renamed Fairwind and Fairland, respectively, with the intention of converting them into immigrant liners for the service from Europe to Australia and New Zealand. Sitmar had held the immigrant service contract by the Australian government from 1955, but the Australian government was asking for new tenders for the period of 1970 onwards, and Sitmar needed new ships to use for the service. However, despite the purchase of Fairwind and Fairland, Sitmar lost the contract to Chandris Lines, and as a result Fairwind and Fairland were laid up at Southampton.

Having failed to keep the immigrant subsidiaries, Sitmar decided to convert their recently acquired ships for cruise service instead. Fairwind received a year-long refit between January 1970 and January 1971, after which she joined her sister (completed some two months earlier and renamed Fairsea) on the North American cruise market, on which she proved highly popular. During the northern hemisphere winter season the Fairwind made cruises to South America from Fort Lauderdale, while during the summer season she sailed from San Francisco on cruises to Canada and Alaska. In the late 1980s Sitmar decided to change their brand identity with a new external livery and new naming policy. Following an impact with a sandbar during an Amazon cruise in 1988, Fairwind sailed through the Panama Canal en route to Los Angeles. After disembarking the passengers the ship headed for San Francisco where it received repairs to its propeller and a facelift. Fairwind became the first ship to be re-painted and -named, becoming the blue-funnelled Sitmar Fairwind in 1988. Her career as Sitmar Fairwind proved short, as already on 1 September 1988 Sitmar Cruises was sold to P&O, who decided to close down the Sitmar brand in North America. Just eight days after the acquisition of Sitmar by P&O, Sitmar Fairwind was renamed Dawn Princess and transferred to the fleet of Princess Cruises.

=== 1988–1993: Dawn Princess ===
As Dawn Princess the ship continued cruises mainly aimed at the North American market. At the time Princess Cruises were investing heavily on new tonnage, and the popular Dawn Princess was sold in early 1993 to V-Ships, a subsidiary of Vlasov Group, who had been the owners of Sitmar.

=== 1993–2004: Albatros ===
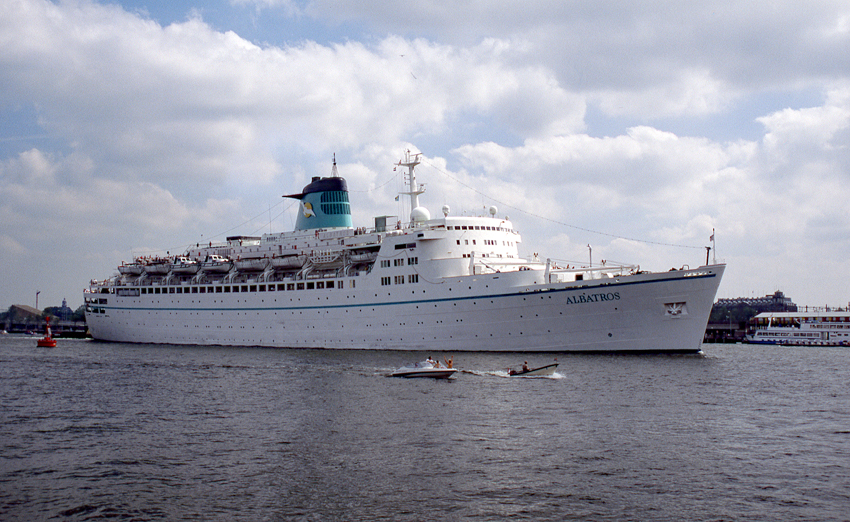
SS Albatros leaving Amsterdam, 2003

Dawn Princess was renamed Albatros after the sale to V-Ships and she was chartered to Phoenix Reisen, a German cruise operator and travel company, initially for five years from 27 March 1993 onwards. On 18 August 1993 Albatros set on her first cruise for Phoenix Reisen from Germany to North Cape, Norway.

On 22 May 1995 Albatros suffered an engine room fire while on a cruise on the Red Sea. Her passengers were evacuated in Jeddah, Saudi Arabia. After passengers were evacuated, the ship sailed to Livorno, Italy for provisional repairs. She received full repairs at Lloyd Werft, Bremerhaven in June, returning to service on 30 June 1995.

On 16 May 1997 Albatros, carrying 800 people, hit Bartholomew's Ledge, St Mary's Sound, Isles of Scilly. The ship returned to St Mary's Road to anchor, escorted by the pilot boat and St Mary's Lifeboat. After two days, the 504 German passengers were taken from the listing ship, returning home on land. The ledge had torn a 200 ft (61 m) gash in the hull of the liner, which was manoeuvring out of the archipelago at 6 knots (11 km/h). On 26 June 1997 Albatros arrived at A & P Shipyard, Southampton, for repairs and returned to service in July of the same year.

In November 2003 Albatros suffered severe machinery problems, hence Phoenix Reisen decided to terminate her charter contract, while V-Ships concluded that the price of repairing the 46-year-old ship would be too high. As a result, she was sold to the scrapyard at Alang, India in December 2003. The ship was renamed Genoa, and on 1 January 2004 she arrived at Alang, where she was beached and subsequently broken up. As a replacement vessel, Crown was quickly chartered in January 2004, and given the name Albatros.
