= RMS Carinthia (1955) =

Ocean liner

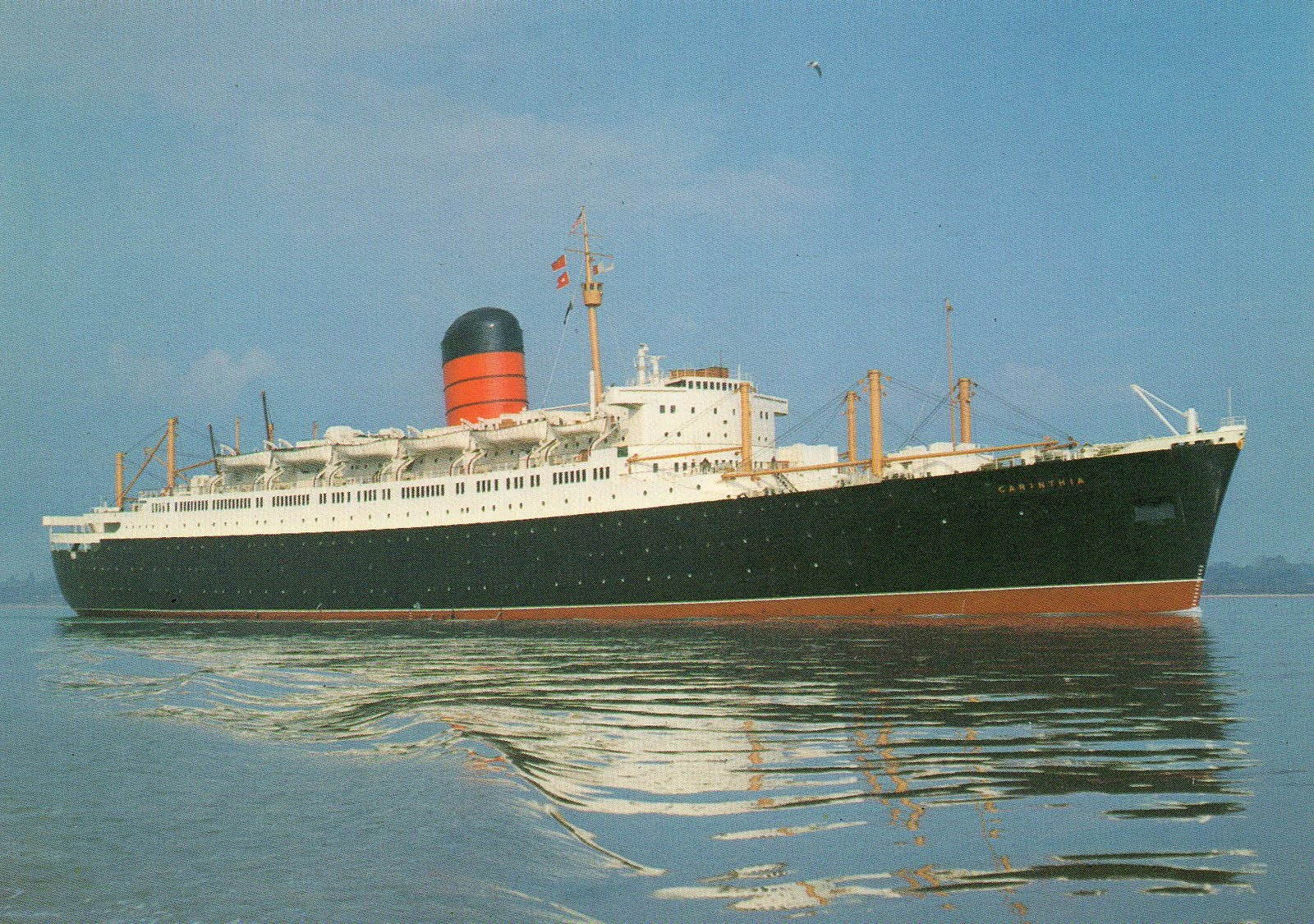
- RMS Carinthia underway

History
- Name: 1956–1968: RMS Carinthia; 1968–1971: Fairland; 1971–1988: Fairsea; 1988–2000: Fair Princess; 2000–2005: China Sea Discovery; 2005: Sea Discovery
- Owner: 1956–1968: Cunard Line; 1968–1988: Sitmar Cruises; 1988–2000: P&O; 2000–2002: Emerald Sea Cruises; 2002–2005: China Sea Cruises
- Operator: 1956–1968: Cunard Line; 1968-1971: laid up; 1971–1988: Sitmar Cruises; 1988–1995: Princess Cruises; 1997–2000: P&O; 2000: Emerald Sea Cruises; 2002–2003: China Sea Cruises
- Port of registry: 1956–1968: Liverpool, United Kingdom; 1968–2005: Monrovia, Liberia
- Ordered: 1955
- Builder: John Brown and Company, Clydebank, Scotland
- Laid down: 1955
- Launched: 14 December 1955
- Completed: 1956
- Maiden voyage: June 1956
- Out of service: 2003
- Identification: IMO number: 5063629
- Fate: Scrapped at Alang, India, 2005

General characteristics (as built)
- Class & type: Saxonia class ocean liner
- Tonnage: 21,946 GRT; 8,500 DWT
- Length: 185.40 m (608 ft 3 in)
- Beam: 24.39 m (80 ft 0 in)
- Draught: 8.70 m (28 ft 7 in)
- Installed power: 4 × John Brown steam turbines; combined 18,277 kW (24,510 hp)
- Propulsion: Two propellers
- Speed: 19.5 knots (36.1 km/h; 22.4 mph) service speed; 25 kn (46 km/h; 29 mph) maximum
- Capacity: 868 passengers
- Crew: 461

General characteristics (after 1970 refit)
- Type: Cruise ship
- Tonnage: 16,627 GRT; 9,509 DWT
- Capacity: 884 passengers
- Notes: Otherwise the same as built

General characteristics (after 1984 refit)
- Capacity: 906 passengers
- Notes: Otherwise the same as built

RMS Carinthia was an ocean liner built in 1956 as one of the four Saxonia-class ships. She sailed for Cunard Line from her completion until 1968 when she was sold to Sitmar Line, rebuilt into a full-time cruise ship and renamed SS Fairsea. She sailed with Sitmar until 1988, when Sitmar was sold to P&O. She was renamed SS Fair Princess and sailed for Princess Cruises and P&O Cruises until 2000. She was then sold to China Sea Cruises and renamed SS China Sea Discovery. In 2005 or 2006 she was scrapped at Alang, India.

== Concept and construction ==
Near the end of 1951 Cunard Line designed new ships for Canadian service on the Liverpool–Montreal–Halifax route. Cunard originally decided to build just two ships but later on two more were ordered. These ships, RMS Saxonia, RMS Ivernia, RMS Carinthia and RMS Sylvania, were the largest ships to be operated to Canada at the time. The ships were built at Clydebank and they were designed for luxury and speed including carrying passengers and cargo up the St Lawrence River in summer and to Pier 21 in Halifax in winter when the St. Lawrence froze.

== Service history ==
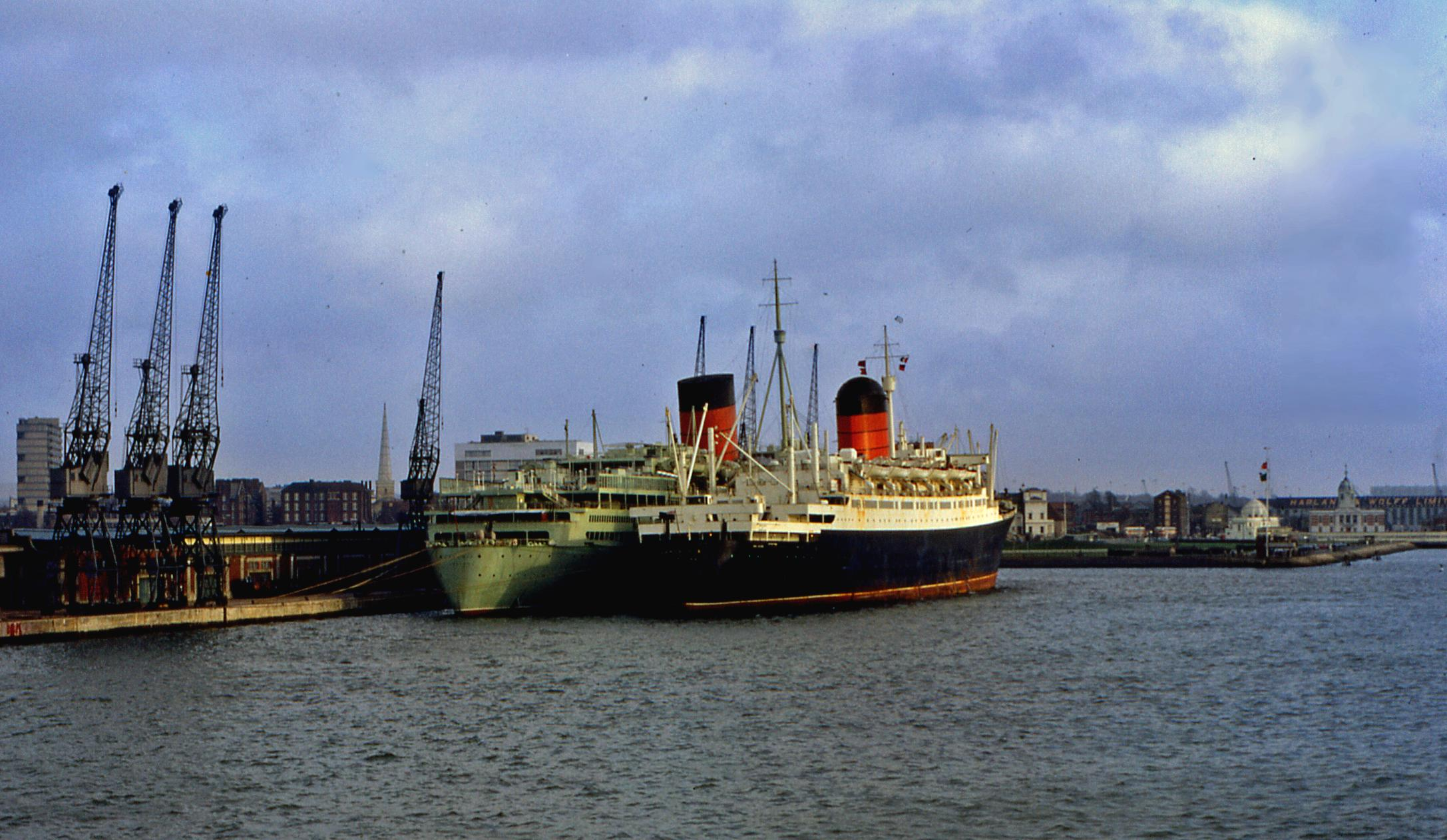
Carinthia laid up alongside Caronia

=== Cunard Line ===
RMS Carinthia started on her maiden voyage to Montreal on 27 June 1956 with 890 passengers and crew on board. After four more voyages, she proved with her running mate RMS Saxonia that the new Canadian Cunarders were so successful that other ships operating on the route were all scrapped leaving the four ships on the Montreal route. During 1960, the Carinthia suffered a fire in one of her cabins. In June of that year, some deck hands set up a skiffle group on a public deck; some passengers complained of the noise and the deck hands were fined a day's pay causing the "skiffle strike". The ship's crew went on strike and others came out in support leaving many liners tied up in the Liverpool docks for several weeks. During 1961 she collided with the SS Tadoussac. In 1962 her propellers failed during a voyage. During 1964, the crew went on strike again. Carinthia was still operated from Liverpool to Montreal until the end of 1966, and from Southampton to Montreal and New York until after March 1967

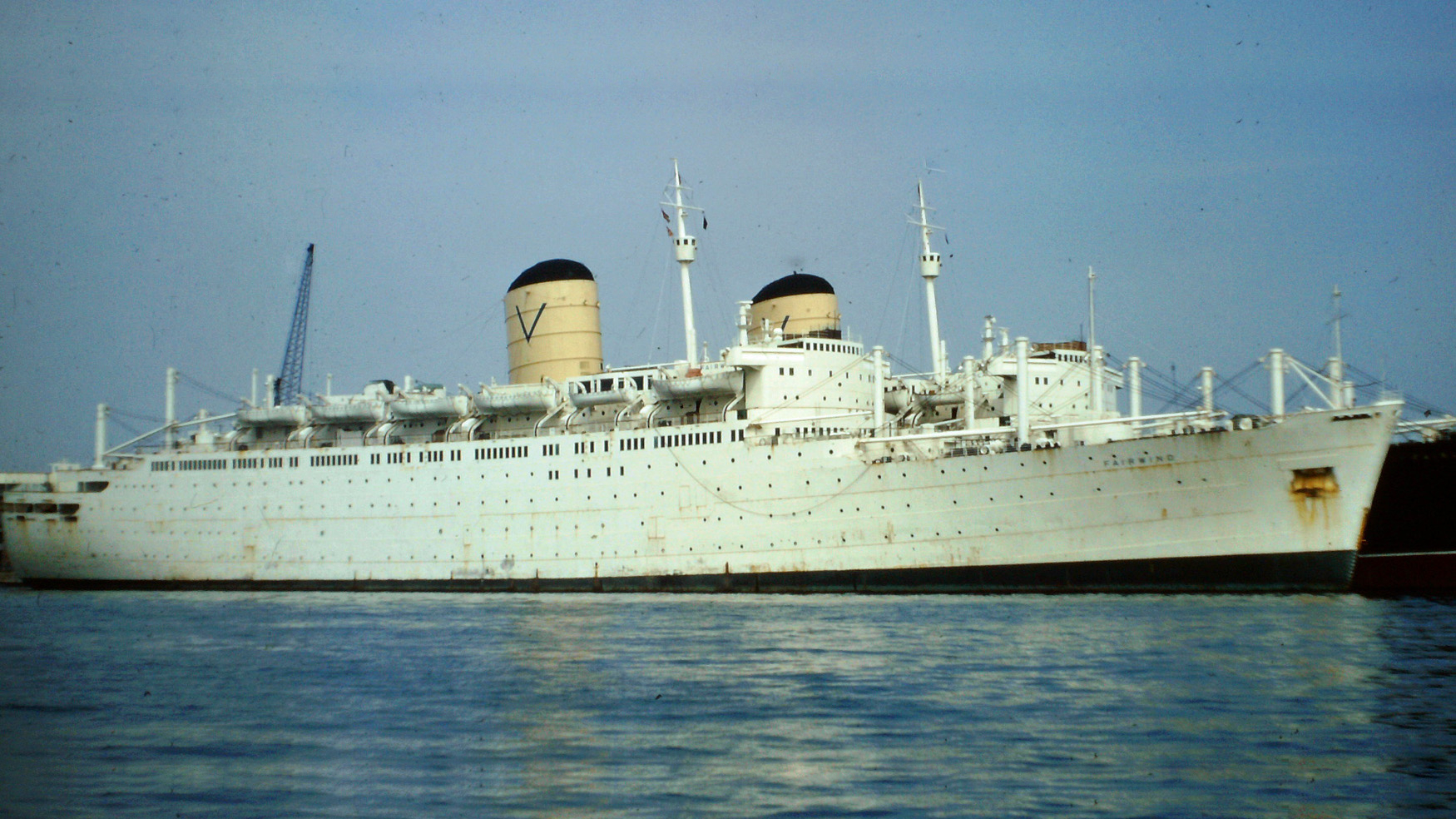
Fairwind and Fairsea laid up at Southampton in August 1969

Cunard Line decided to start operating the Carinthia as a cruise ship during the winter months. She was used on ten-day cruises from New York City to Bermuda. During 1968, along with Sylvania, she was sold to Sitmar Line, initially renamed Fairland and laid up at Southampton for two years.

=== Sitmar Cruises ===
Following year-long major refurbishments of both vessels in Italy, Fairland became Fairsea and in 1972 commenced cruising from the United States West Coast, for the re-styled Sitmar Cruises. Following the sale of Sitmar to P&O in 1988, the vessel was transferred to Princess Cruises and used for Pacific Ocean cruises as the Fair Princess.

=== Princess Cruises and P&O Holidays ===
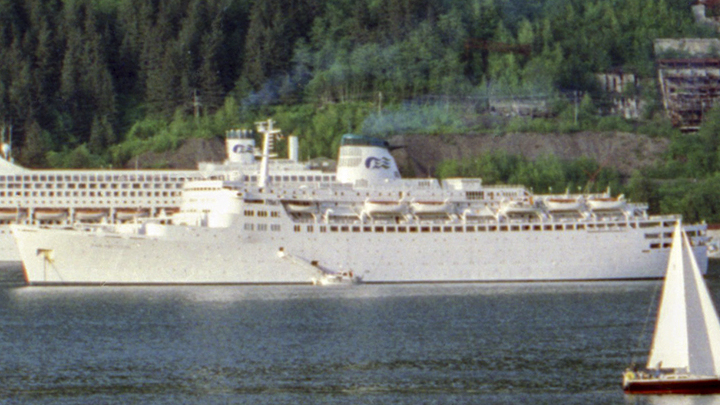
Fair Princess in Alaska

In 1995, Fair Princess was transferred to the fleet of P&O Holidays (now P&O Cruises Australia) but was immediately chartered to Regency Cruises where she was to sail as their Regent Isle. Regent Isle was advertised for Regency's 1996 season, but due to their September 1995 bankruptcy, she never made a voyage for them. In 1997 the ship commenced voyages for P&O Holidays, replacing the recently retired TSS Fairstar. She remained with P&O Australia for the remainder of the decade.

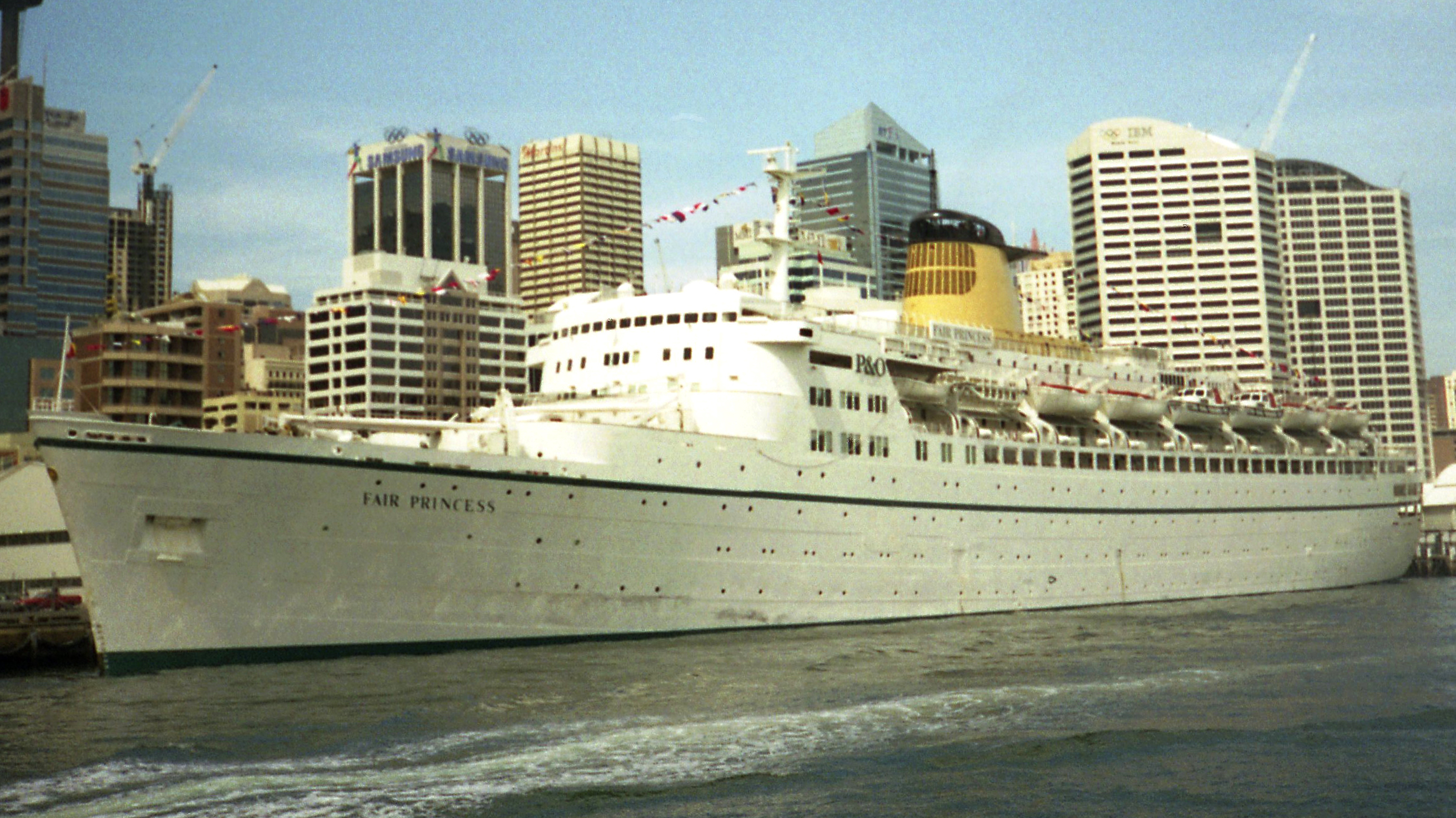
Fair Princess in P&O Holidays livery

=== China Sea Cruises ===
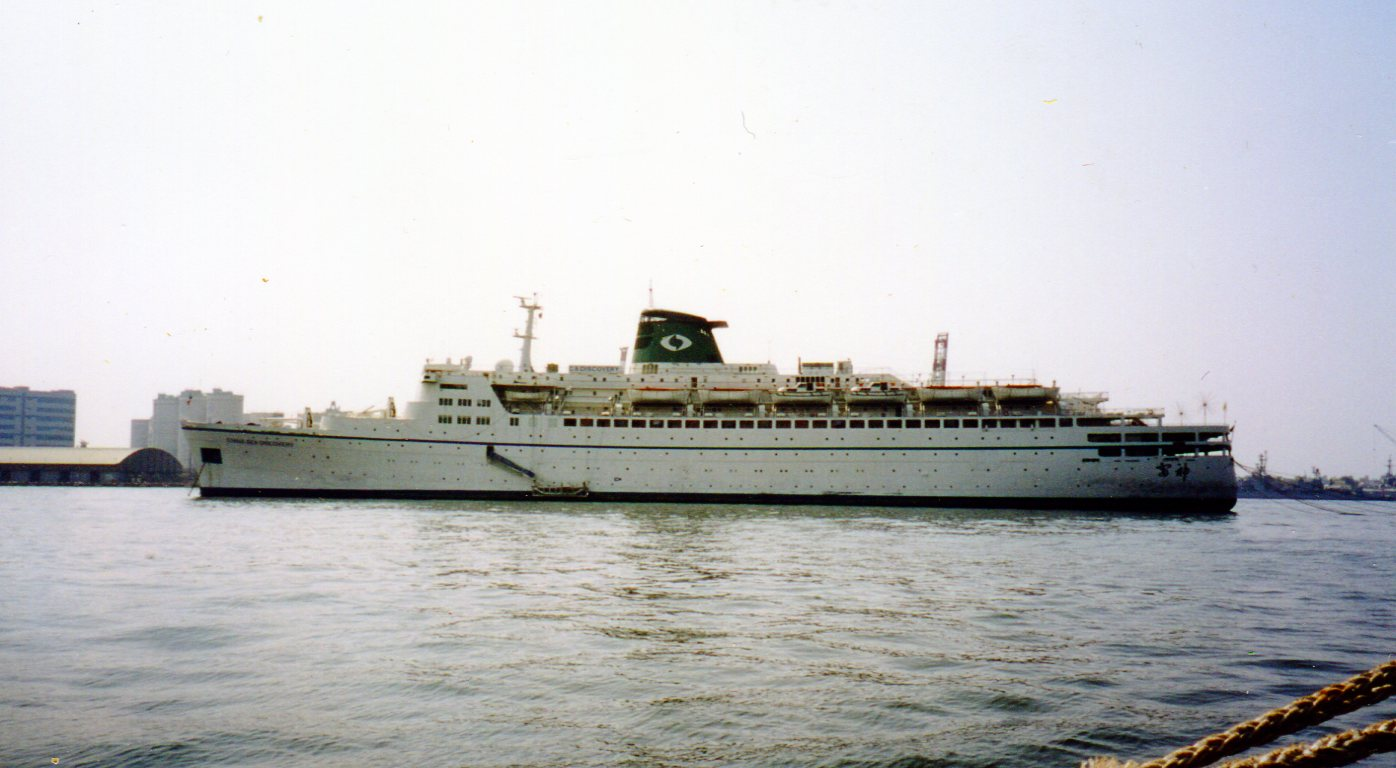
China Sea Discovery anchored in Kaohsiung's harbor on 22 February 2002

In 2000, the ship was sold to China Sea Cruises and renamed China Sea Discovery. She operated as a casino cruise ship but was unsuccessful. During 2001 she operated in Taiwan. Finally after many unsuccessful voyages she was moved to Alang, India, to be scrapped. While under scrapping, a fire broke out in the engine room, killing five workers, and injuring another fifteen people. In the end, the ship was scrapped in either 2005 or 2006.
