= RMS Saxonia (1954) =

Passenger ship

- Postcard of RMS Saxonia

History
- Name: 1954–1962: RMS Saxonia; 1962–1973: RMS Carmania; 1973–1999: SS Leonid Sobinov
- Owner: 1954–1973: Cunard Line; 1973–1990: Black Sea Shipping Company; 1990–1999: Transorient Overseas
- Operator: 1954–1971: Cunard Line; 1973–1995: Black Sea Shipping Company
- Port of registry: 1954–1963: Liverpool, United Kingdom; 1963–1973: Southampton, United Kingdom; 1973–1990: Odessa, Soviet Union; 1990–1999: Valletta, Malta
- Builder: John Brown and Company of Clydebank, Scotland
- Yard number: 692
- Launched: 17 February 1954
- Completed: August 1954
- Maiden voyage: 2 September 1954
- Out of service: 6 October 1995
- Identification: Call sign: 9HDU3 (Carmania call sign : GSJS); IMO number: 5064324
- Fate: Scrapped in Alang, India in 1999.

General characteristics (as built, 1954)
- Class & type: Saxonia class ocean liner
- Tonnage: 21,637 GRT; 8,836 DWT
- Length: 608 ft (185 m)
- Beam: 80 ft (24 m)
- Draught: 28 ft (8.5 m)
- Installed power: 24,500shp
- Propulsion: Geared turbines from builders, Twin screw
- Speed: 20 knots (37.04 km/h; 23.02 mph)
- Capacity: 125 first class, 800 tourist class
- Crew: 461

General characteristics (as rebuilt, 1963)
- Type: Ocean liner/cruise ship hybrid
- Tonnage: 22,592 GRT (1969, 21,370 GRT)
- Capacity: 117 1st class, 764 tourist class
- Notes: Otherwise the same as built

RMS Saxonia was a British passenger liner built by John Brown & Company at Clydebank, Scotland for the Cunard Steamship Company for their Liverpool-Montreal service. She was the first of four almost identical sister ships built by Browns between 1954 and 1957 for UK-Montreal service. The other three were the Ivernia (1955), Carinthia (1956) and Sylvania (1957)

The Saxonia and Ivernia were extensively rebuilt in 1962-63 as dual purpose liner/cruise ships. They were renamed Carmania and Franconia respectively and painted in the same green cruising livery as the older Caronia. Carmania continued transatlantic crossings and cruises until September 1967 when she closed out Cunard's Montreal service. She and Franconia, had been painted white at the end of 1966 and from 1968 Carmania sailed as a full time cruise ship until withdrawal after arriving at Southampton on 31 October 1971. In August 1973 she was bought by the Soviet Union-based Black Sea Shipping Company and renamed SS Leonid Sobinov. The ship was scrapped in 1999.

== History ==
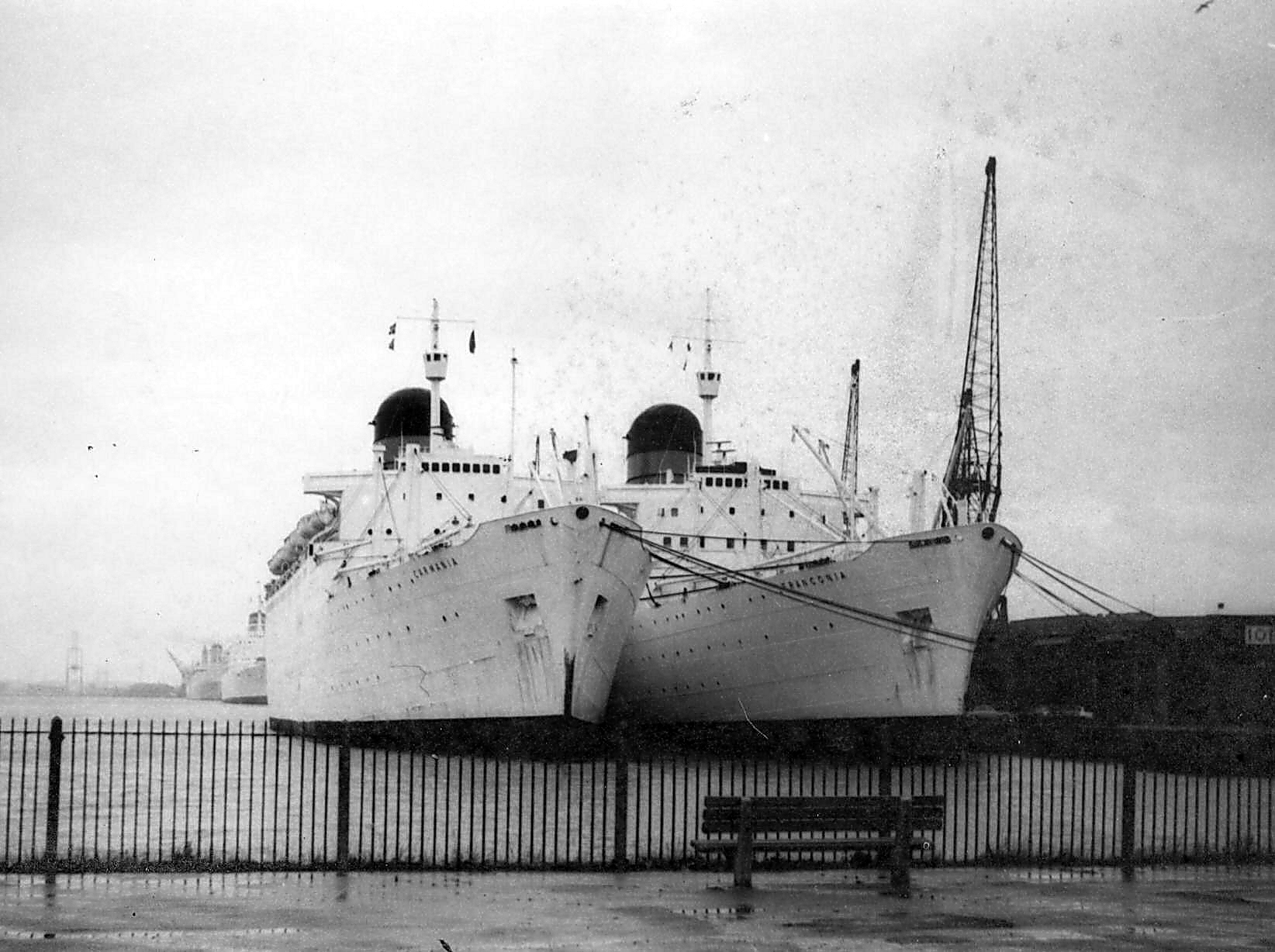
Franconia and Carmania Laid up in Southampton.

Prior to World War II, Cunard's Canadian services had been maintained by a group of six similar 14,000 GRT liners of the Andania class built between 1922 and 1925. One of these was a war loss and another four were purchased by the Admiralty during the war and converted to naval repair ships. None of these ever returned to commercial service. This left Cunard with one ship, Ascania from its pre war Canadian fleet. She was joined in the post war service by three of the surviving units of the 20,000 GRT Scythia class which had been built for the Liverpool-New York service. Of the four, only Ascania was able to reach Montreal, draught causing the others to turn around at Quebec. With this unsatisfactory situation and the age of the ships, it was inevitable that the decision to build would be taken and at the end of 1951 Cunard announced its intention to order two new ships for the Canadian service (the other two came later).

Saxonia was launched on 17 February 1954 by Lady Churchill, wife of the then Prime Minister, and revived a name previously used for the Cunard liner RMS Saxonia, which had been launched in 1899 and scrapped in 1925. Completed early in August 1954, Saxonia arrived in Liverpool on the 23rd of that month and was prepared for her maiden voyage from Liverpool to Montreal which began on 2 September 1954. She was joined by her sisters, Ivernia in July 1955, Carinthia in June 1956 and Sylvania in June 1957. The ship was refitted in 1962 and given another Cunard name from earlier in the century, Carmania. As Carmania, the vessel continued service on the Rotterdam - Le Havre - Southampton - Canada route for several years, and cruised in the Caribbean and Mediterranean in the winters.

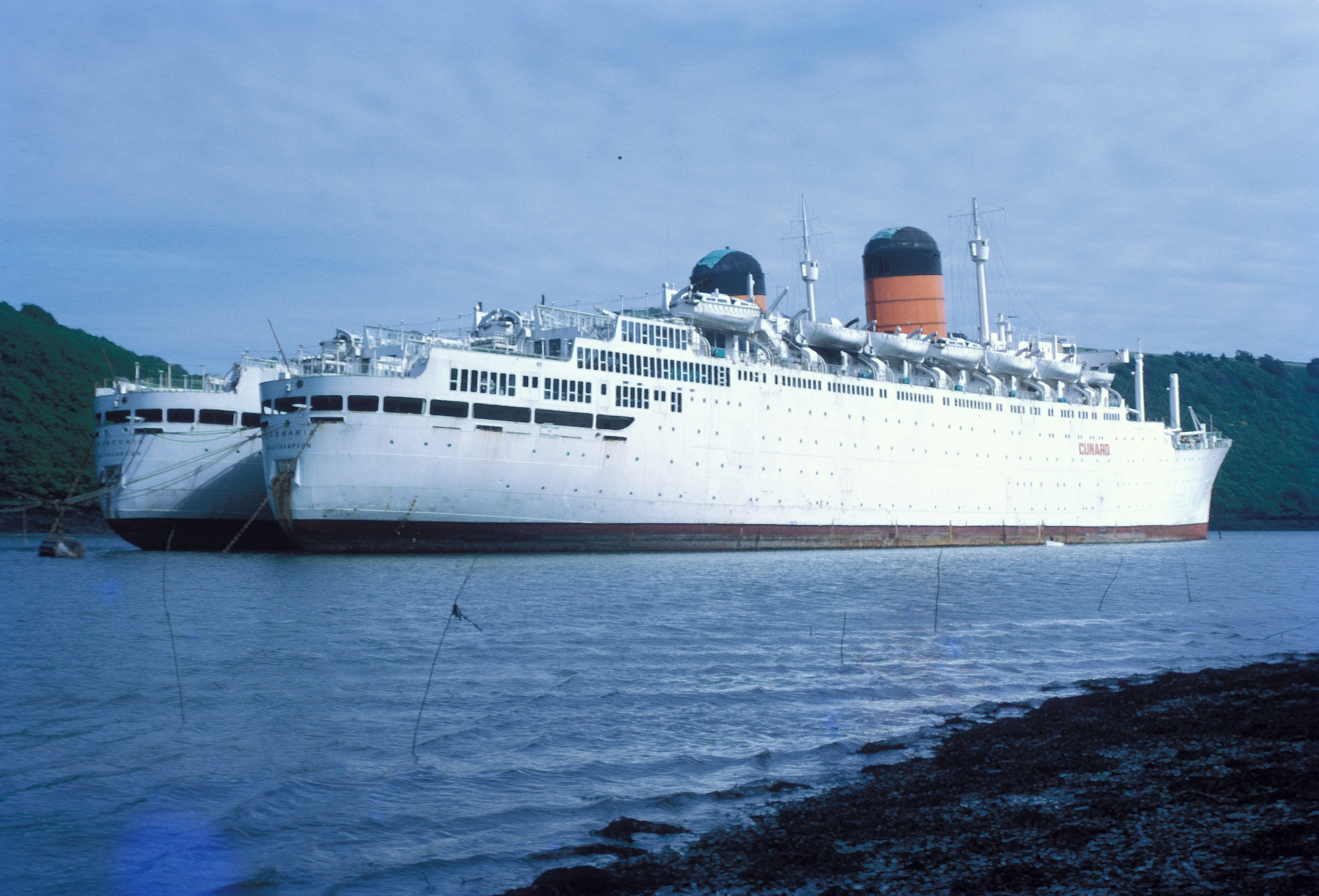
Franconia and Carmania Laid up in Falmouth.

In 1968, the ship had a major breakdown at the mouth of the Saint Lawrence River when she appeared to ‘throw’ a propeller shaft, and then had difficulties with US fire regulations that resulted in the cancellation of a winter cruise from Port Everglades. Cunard made some minor modifications to the ship before the next sailing in January 1969. On a later cruise the vessel ran aground on a sandbank off San Salvador Island in the Bahamas. Three months after returning to service the ship collided with the 3,900-ton Soviet tanker Frunze, but damage to both vessels was apparently minor.

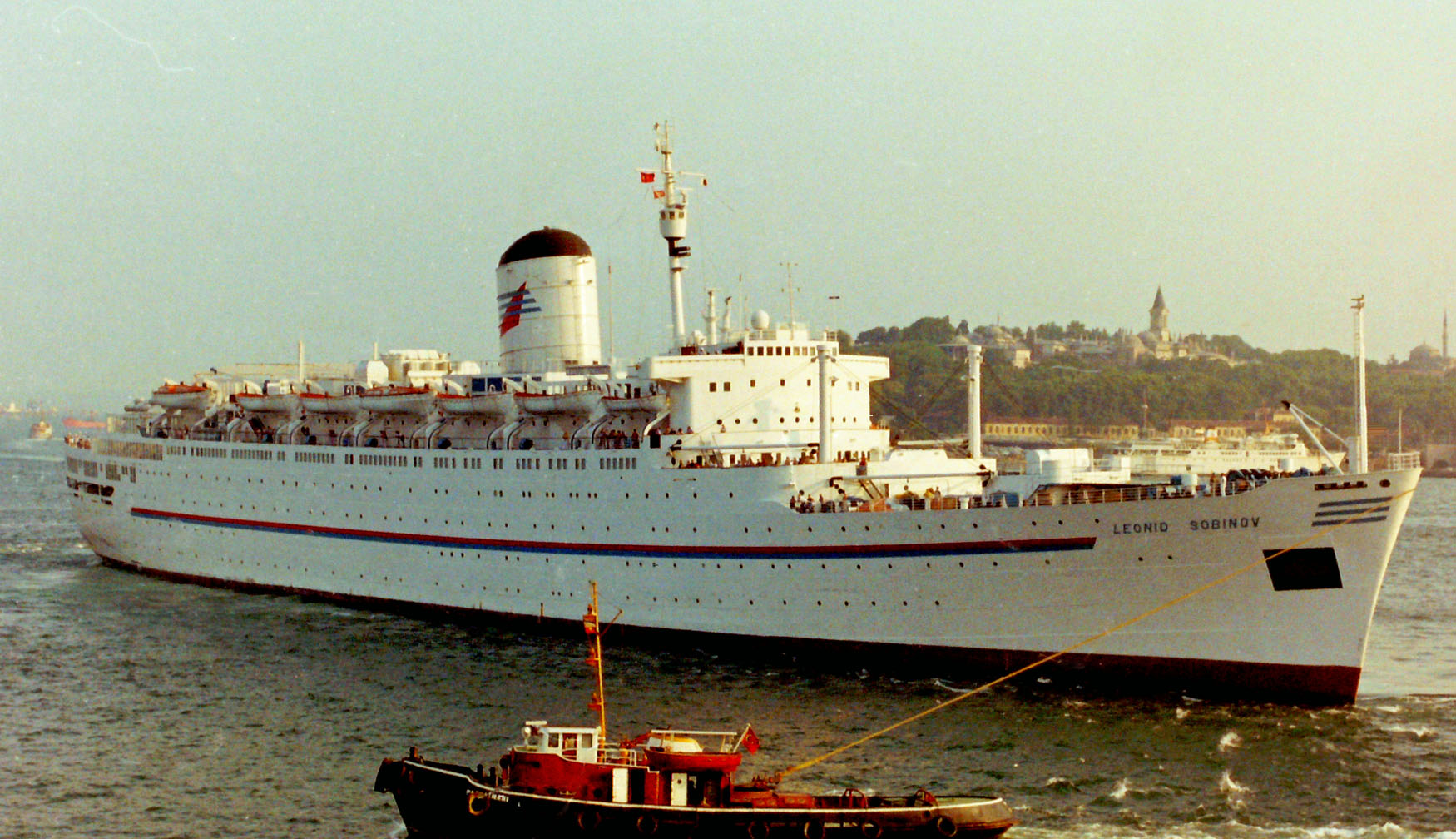
Leonid Sobinov in Istanbul on 1 August 1992.

She was laid up at Southampton in 1971. In August 1973 she was bought by the Soviet Union-based Black Sea Shipping Company and renamed after Leonid Sobinov. In January 1979, as the ship lay in Sydney Harbour, an 18-year-old crew member, Liliana Gasinskaya, slipped out of a porthole wearing only a red bikini, and swam across the harbour to claim political asylum. She rapidly achieved fame as the Red Bikini Girl, and, amongst other things, was the first nude centerfold in Australia's edition of Penthouse Magazine.The SS Leonid Sobinov was featured in two action films produced by Mosfilm: 'Double Overtake' (1984) and 'The Detached Mission' (1985). By 1995, the liner was laid up, and in 1999, she was brought to Alang, India and scrapped after a long and varied career.
