= V-Ships =

Ship Management Company

V.Group Limited
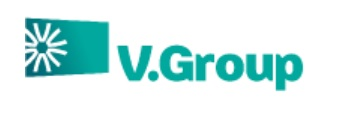
- Type: Shipping
- Industry: Ship Management
- Founded: 1984
- Headquarters: 1st Floor, 63 Queen Victoria Street, EC4N 4UA, London, UK
- Number of employees: 3,000 ashore/44,000 at sea
- Subsidiaries: VGG, Selandia Group, Acomarit, BGI, GMTC Offshore Training Centre, ITM
- Website: https://vgrouplimited.com/

V.Ships is a ship management company, part of V.Group Holdings Limited which is registered in Monaco but headquartered in London, England; and has over 60 offices in 30 different countries. Its 51% majority shares are owned by the American equity company Advent International.

V Group Limited formed in 1984 and supplies ship management and related marine services to the global shipping industry. V.Group's core marine activities are managed by three operating divisions: Ship Management; V.Ships Leisure; and Crew Management. Other divisions include the Ship Supply Chain division, Marine Services division and Offshore Division. Through its V.Ships and ITM brands, it manages a fleet of over 1,000 vessels, a crew roster of over 26,000 and several marine technical services brands. The chairman of V.Group is Graham Westgarth and the chief executive officer is René Kofod-Olsen.

As of December 2016, V.Group operates out of 60 international offices, managing commercial ships including bulk carriers, tankers, cruise liners and off shore vessels. It employs more than 3,000 people ashore and over 44,000 personnel in marine and offshore roles. V.Group are one of the largest ship management companies in the world.

In November 2016, two large ship management companies Bibby Marine and Selandia Ship Management were taken over by V.group.

In February 2022, it was announced that all ships owned by Crystal Cruises and Dream Cruises would now be managed by V.Ships as part of court rulings relating to the closure and liquidation of Crystal Cruises as a result of the bankruptcy of their parent company Genting Hong Kong.

== Ownership ==
In 2011, the Canadian investment group OMERS acquired a majority stake in V.Group, which it retained up to 2016. In December 2016, the Ontario municipal workers pension fund sold 51% of the shares of the V.Group to an investment company called Advent international, thus transferring its ownership. At that time, the investment company OMER group also had a majority stake in V.Group. As of July 2018, Advent international remains the majority shareholder of V Group, with OMER investments and V group's own management team retaining minority stakes in the company.

On 17 June 2024, a consortium led by STAR Capital, including Ackermans & van Haaren (Euronext: ACKB) and others, has signed an agreement to acquire the company from Advent International. The transaction is subject to regulatory consents and is expected to complete in early autumn 2024. Financial terms have not been disclosed.
