= RMS Ivernia (1954) =

Saxonia class ocean liner

- A postcard of the RMS Ivernia.

History
- Name: 1955–1963: RMS Ivernia; 1963–1973: RMS Franconia; 1973–2004: Fedor Shalyapin; 2004: Salona
- Owner: 1955–1973: Cunard Line; 1973–1980: Far Eastern Shipping Company; 1980–1989: Black Sea Shipping Company; 1989–2004: Odessa Cruise Company
- Operator: 1955–1973: Cunard Line; 1973–1980: Far Eastern Shipping Company; 1980–1989: Black Sea Shipping Company; 1989–2004: Odessa Cruise Company
- Port of registry: 1955–1973: (United Kingdom) Liverpool; 1973–1980: (Soviet Union) Vladivostok; 1980–1991: (Soviet Union) Odesa; 1991–2001: (Malta) Valletta; 2001–2004: (Ukraine) Odesa; 2004: (Saint Vincent and the Grenadines) Kingstown
- Ordered: 1951
- Builder: John Brown & Company, Clydebank
- Yard number: 693
- Laid down: December 1951
- Launched: 14 December 1954
- Christened: 1955
- Completed: 1955
- Maiden voyage: 1 July 1955
- Out of service: 1995
- Identification: IMO number: 5119765; Call sign: GTKX
- Fate: Scrapped at Alang, India, in 2004

General characteristics
- Class & type: Saxonia class ocean liner
- Tonnage: 21,717 GRT
- Length: 608 ft 3 in (185.39 m)
- Beam: 80 ft 4 in (24.49 m)
- Draught: 28 ft 6 in (8.69 m)
- Installed power: 4 steam turbines, 24,500 shp (18,300 kW)
- Propulsion: Two propellers
- Speed: 20 kn (37 km/h; 23 mph), 25 kn (46 km/h) during sea trials.
- Capacity: 929 passengers
- Crew: 461

RMS Ivernia was a Saxonia-class ocean liner, completed in 1955 by John Brown & Company at Clydebank, Scotland for Cunard Line, for their transatlantic passenger service between the UK and Canada. In 1963 she was rebuilt as a cruise ship and renamed RMS Franconia, after the famous pre-war liner Franconia (1922). She continued to sail for Cunard until being withdrawn from service and laid up in 1971. In 1973 she was sold to the Soviet Union's Far Eastern Shipping Company and, renamed SS Fedor Shalyapin, cruised around Australia and the far East. In 1980 she was transferred to the Black Sea Shipping Company fleet, and for a time returned to cruising in the Mediterranean and around Europe. In 1989 she was transferred again, to the Odessa Cruise Company, and continued her career as a cruise ship until 1994. She was then laid up at Illichivsk, a Black Sea port 40 km (25 mi) southwest of Odesa, until 2004 when, as the Salona, she sailed to Alang, India, where she was scrapped.

== Saxonia quartet ==
Near the end of 1951 Cunard Line announced their intention to build two new ships for the Liverpool—Montreal route. Not long afterwards, the plans were extended to build four ships rather than two: RMS Saxonia, RMS Ivernia, RMS Carinthia and RMS Sylvania. They were designed to be the largest ships operated until then by Cunard on their service between the United Kingdom and Canada, while still being able to navigate the St Lawrence River to Montreal. The contracts for building all four ships were awarded to John Brown & Company, at Clydebank.

== Career ==
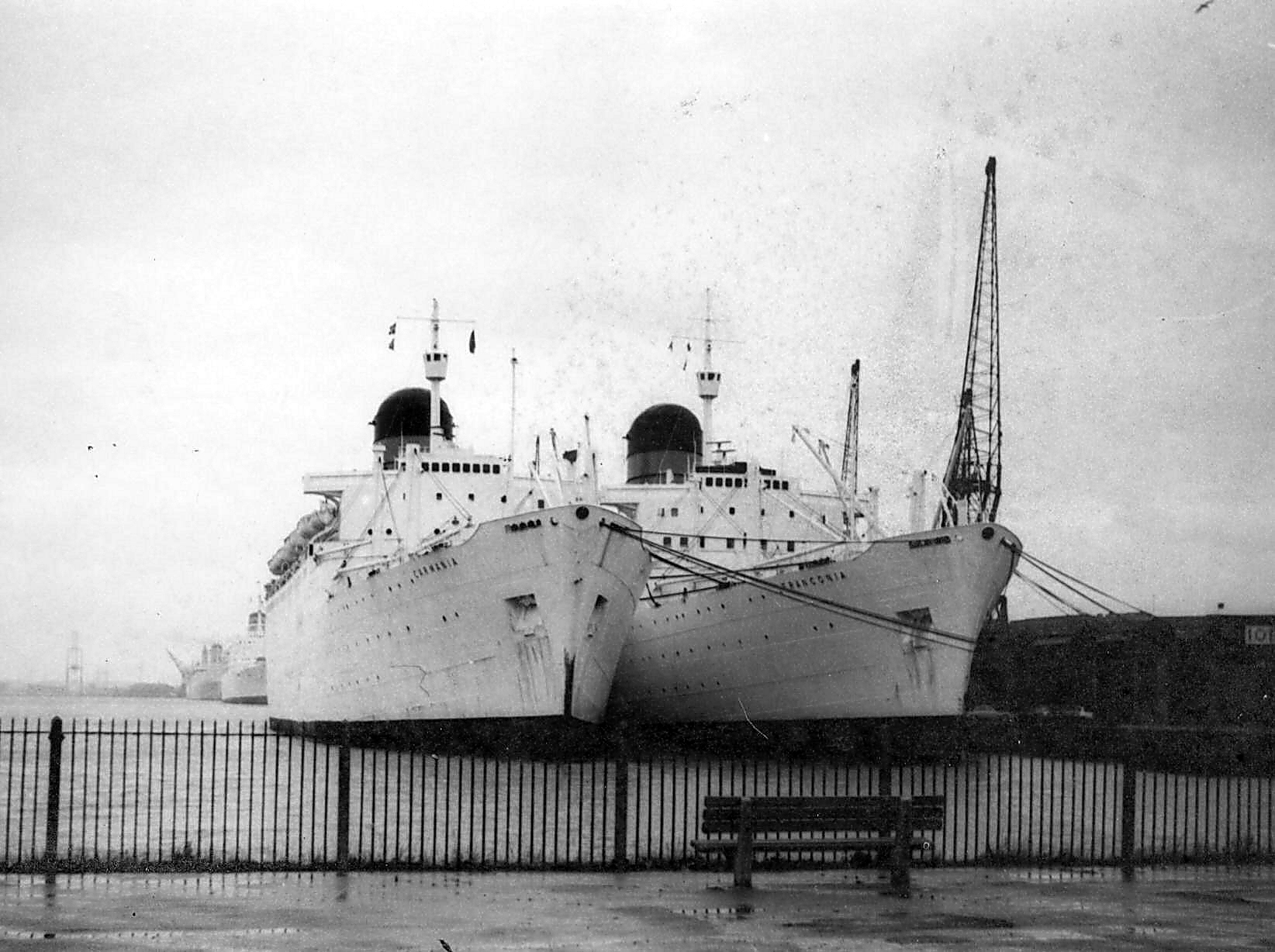
Franconia and Carmania laid up at Southampton

RMS Ivernia was launched at Clydebank on 14 December 1954 by Mrs C D Howe, the wife of the C. D. Howe, the Canadian minister of trade. Completed six months later, she underwent sea trials, and then prepared for her maiden voyage. The original plan had been for her to set off from Liverpool on 26 June 1955, but industrial action forced a change of plan, and instead, she left Greenock on 1 July 1955, carrying 900 passengers and crew, on her maiden voyage to Quebec and Montreal. She arrived safely in Montreal on 6 July 1955.

For the first year of operation, Saxonia and Ivernia shared the Canada route with the older Cunard ships Franconia, Ascania and Scythia. As the third and fourth Saxonia-class ships entered service, however, the older ships were withdrawn, and by mid-1957 the Saxonia sisters were the only Cunard ships sailing the UK-Canada route.

By 1962, the increasing popularity and availability of air travel was having a distinct impact on the profitability of transatlantic shipping services, and Cunard decided to refit the Ivernia for cruising. At the same time, they decided to change her name to Franconia, the older ship of that name having been withdrawn from service several years earlier. Ivernia arrived at John Brown's Clydebank shipyard on 11 October 1962 for a major refit, and emerged as the new Franconia on 25 May 1963 in "Caronia green" colours (see RMS Caronia).

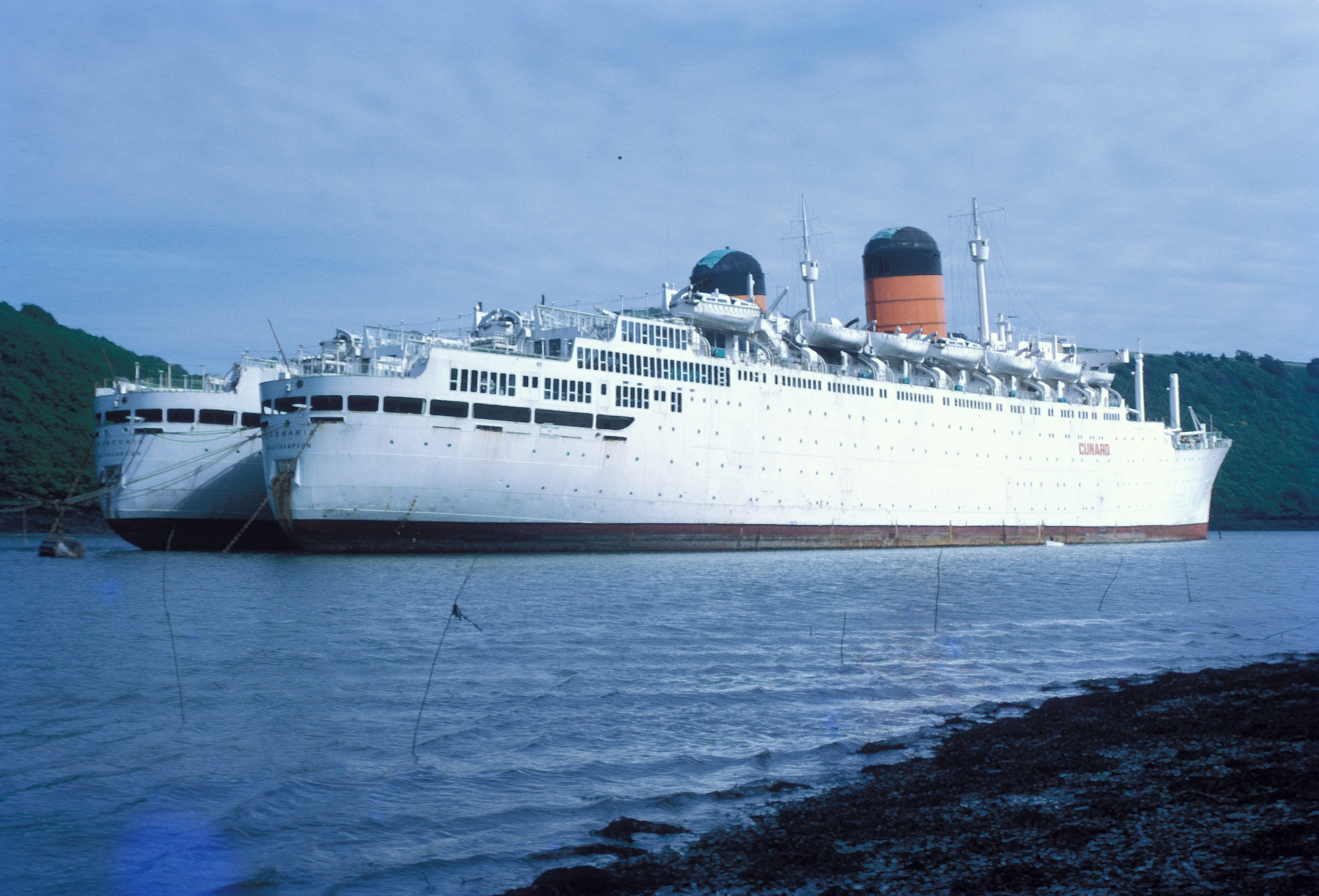
Franconia and Carmania Laid up on the River Fal

From 1963 until 1967, Franconia continued to operate a reduced passenger service between the UK and Canada during the summer months, and spent the winter months cruising the Mediterranean and Caribbean seas. In 1967 the decision was made to withdraw her completely from transatlantic passenger service, and after a refit (during which she was painted white, instead of Caronia green), she switched to permanent cruising service, alternating between the Caribbean, Bermuda, and the Atlantic isles (Madeira, the Azores and the Canary Islands) and north Africa.

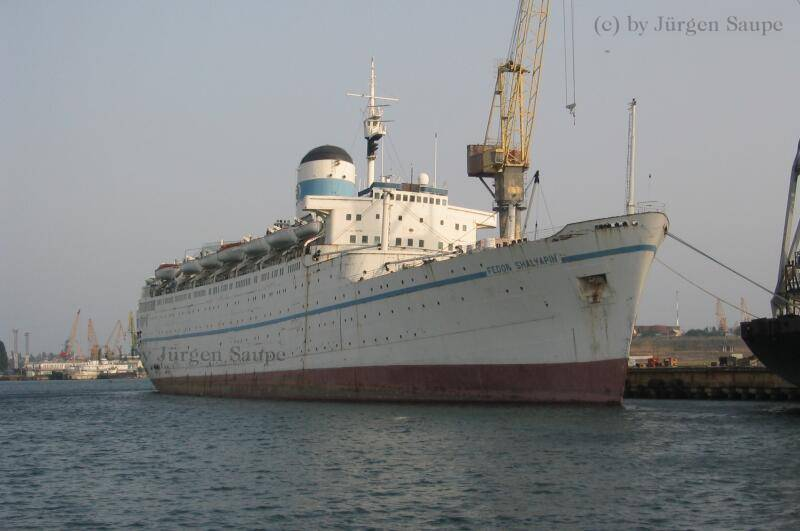
Fedor Shalyapin laid up at Illichivsk

In 1971, Cunard was taken over by Trafalgar House. During the subsequent re-organisation, it was decided that, with new ships in construction, it would not be worth the cost to refit and upgrade the Franconia. She was withdrawn from service and laid up, initially at Southampton, and then in the River Fal, Cornwall, while a new owner was sought. In 1973, she was purchased by the Far Eastern Shipping Company and started a new career cruising around Australia and the Far East. She was also given a new name: SS Fedor Shalyapin. In the late 1970s and early 1980s, she was withdrawn from the Australian cruise routes, and for a few years sailed on routes such as Odesa to Cuba.

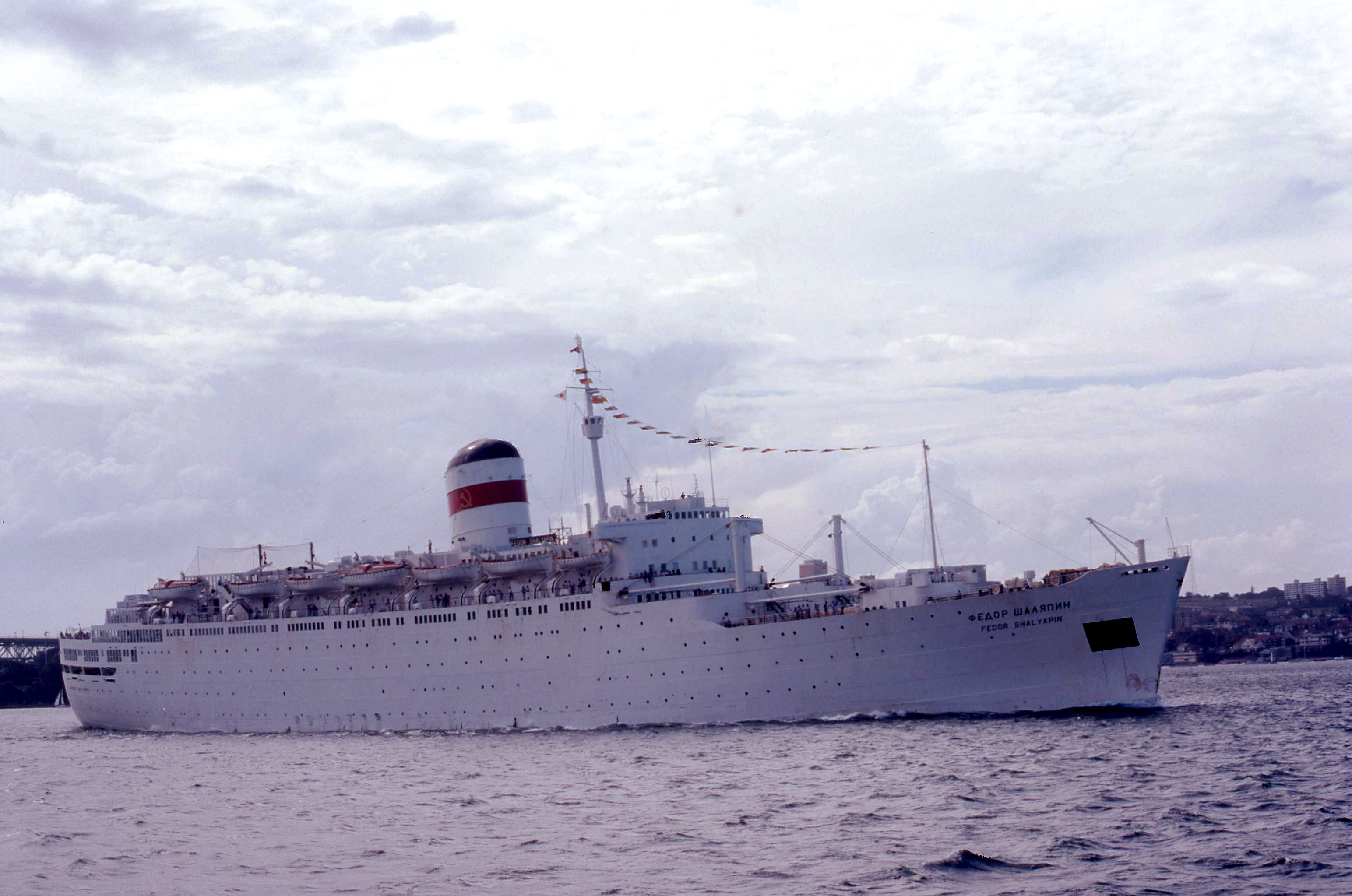
Fedor Shalyapin leaving for a cruise near Fort Denison in Sydney Harbour

In 1980 she was transferred to the Black Sea Shipping Company. For several years in the early to mid-1980s she was chartered by a German company, Jahn Reisen GmbH, and resumed cruising in the Mediterranean and the Far East. In 1992, the ship was transferred to the Odessa Cruise Company, a company registered in Malta. She continued to operate out of Odesa. In mid-1994, she made an extended cruise from St Petersburg, calling at 20 ports around Europe and in the Mediterranean ending at Odesa. It was her last cruise, and in 1995 she was laid up at Ilichevsk, a Black Sea port 40 km (25 mi) southwest of Odesa.

She remained there until February 2004, when, as the Salona, she sailed to Alang, India, and was scrapped. Her three sister ships also ended their careers at Alang – Saxonia in 1999, Sylvania in January 2004, and Carinthia in November 2005.
