= The Sun (disambiguation) =

The Sun is the star at the center of the Solar System.

The Sun may also refer to:

== Publications ==
=== United Kingdom ===
- The Sun (United Kingdom), a current daily national tabloid
- The Sun (1792–1876), a defunct British newspaper
- The Sun (1893–1906), a defunct British newspaper

=== United States ===
==== Magazines ====
- The Sun (magazine), a monthly literary and photography magazine

==== Newspapers ====
Listed alphabetically by state

- The San Bernardino Sun, a newspaper founded in 1894 in California
- The Baltimore Sun, Baltimore's newspaper of record, published in Maryland
- The Sun (Lowell), a daily newspaper in Massachusetts
- Sun, later the Ann Arbor Sun, a defunct underground newspaper in Michigan
- The Sun (New York City), a defunct daily newspaper (1833–1950) in New York
- The Sun (Sheridan), a defunct weekly newspaper (1890–2014) in Oregon
- The Sun, later called Peck's Sun, a newspaper founded by George Wilbur Peck in Wisconsin

==== Online news sites ====
- The New York Sun, a 21st-century news site, which published as a broadsheet during 2002–2008
- The U.S. Sun, the American online edition of The Sun (United Kingdom)
- The Washington Sun, a D.C.-based news site covering national politics and local news

=== Elsewhere ===
- Taiyō (magazine), a defunct Japanese magazine known as The Sun in English (1895–1928)
- Sun Newspapers (Northern Territory), community newspapers in Darwin, Australia
- The Sun (Hong Kong), a defunct Chinese-language newspaper (1999–2016)
- The SUN (Hong Kong), an English-language newspaper for Filipinos
- The Sun (Malaysia), an English-language newspaper in Malaysia
- The Sun (New Zealand), a defunct New Zealand newspaper
- The Sun (Nigeria), a daily Nigerian newspaper
- The Sun (Rangoon), a defunct Burmese newspaper (1911–1954)
- The Sun (Sydney), a defunct Australian tabloid (1910–1988)
- The Toronto Sun (Canada), started in 1971 as newspaper print, famous for the weekly backpage Sunshine Girl models. Still in daily production.

== Arts and entertainment ==
=== Films ===
- The Sun (2005 film), a Russian biographical film about Japanese Emperor Hirohito
- The Sun (2016 film), a Japanese science fiction drama film
- Sun Children, a 2020 Iranian film also known as The Sun

=== Music ===
==== Artists ====
- The Sun (American band)
- The Sun (Estonian band)

==== Albums ====
- The Sun (Cat Empire album)
- The Sun, an album by FanFan
- The Sun (Fridge album)
- The Sun, an album by Joseph

==== Songs ====
- "The Sun" (song), a 2013 song by Demy and Alex Leon
- "The Sun", by Maroon 5 from the 2002 album Songs About Jane
- "The Sun", a 2014 single by Parov Stelar
- "The Sun", an original Barney song from Barney in Outer Space
- "I. The Sun", by the Microphones from Mount Eerie
- "The Sun", by the Cat Empire from The Sun

=== Fictional and literary uses ===
- The Sun (tarot card), a trump card in the tarot deck
- The Sun (wordless novel), a 1919 book of woodcut prints by Frans Masereel
- Ash-Shams ("The Sun"), the ninety-first sura of the Qur'an
- The Sun, a The House of the Dead III character
- The Sun (Golub and Pasachoff book), a 2017 popular science book by Leon Golub and Jay Pasachoff

== Other uses ==
- The Sun (St. Paul's Churchyard), a historical bookseller in London

== See also ==
- Sun (disambiguation)
- Sun (newspaper)
- The Sunday Sun (disambiguation), name of various newspapers
- Le Soleil (French for "The Sun"), name of various newspapers
- Die Son (Afrikaans for "The Sun"), a daily South African tabloid
