= Sun (disambiguation) =

The Sun is the star at the center of the Solar System.

Sun may also refer to:

- Sun, an abbreviation for Sunday
- Any fusor, like stars or substars, appearing large in the skies of a planetary system

== Religion ==
- Sun god, or solar deity in religion

== Places ==
- SUN, ISO 3166-1 code for the Soviet Union
- Sun, West Virginia, USA; an unincorporated community
- Sun Glacier, a glacier in Greenland
- Sun, Louisiana, USA; a village

== Companies ==
- Sunoco, known as Sun Company, Sun Oil Company, or variations from 1890 to 1998
- Sun Cellular, a telecommunications provider
- Sun Microsystems, a former computer company
- Sun Finance, a Latvian company
- Sun Group, an Indian conglomerate
- Sun Media, a large Canadian media company
- Sun (St. Paul's Churchyard), a historical bookseller in London
- Sun Orthodontix
- Sun Television and Appliances
- Sun TV Network, Chennai, India

== Literature ==
- Sun Newspapers, a chain of weekly newspapers in Ohio
- List of newspapers named Sun
- List of newspapers named Daily Sun
- Sun, a book of poetry by Michael Palmer

== Music ==
=== Artists ===
- Sun (German band), an alternative rock group
- Sun (R&B band), an American group
- Silver Sun or Sun, a British power pop band
- Sun, an Australian group featuring drummer Oren Ambarchi
- Something Unto Nothing (S.U.N.), a band project formed by Brian Tichy

=== Albums ===
- Sun (Cat Power album)
- Sun (Nopsajalka album)
- Sun (Thomas Bergersen album)

=== Songs ===
- "Sun" (Belinda Carlisle song) (2013)
- "Sun" (Live song)
- "Sun" (Two Door Cinema Club song) (2012)
- "Sun" (Gen Hoshino song) (2015)
- "Sun", a 1989 song by Concrete Blonde from Free
- "Sun", a 2025 song by JID and Anycia from God Does Like Ugly
- "SUN", a 2012 song by Mouse on Mars from WOW
- "Sun", a 1997 single by John Lydon from Psycho's Path

=== Record labels ===
- Sun Records
- Sun Records (jazz)

== Stage and screen ==
- Sun (film), a 1929 Italian drama directed by Alessandro Blasetti

=== Television stations and networks ===
- Sun News (India), a 24-hour Tamil news channel
- Sun News Network, a defunct Canadian news channel
- Sun Sports, an American television network
- Sun Television, a Japanese television station
- SUN TV (Canada), former Toronto TV station
- Sun TV (India), a Tamil-language regional cable-television station
- INews, previously known as SUN TV, an Indonesian station
- WSUN (FM), a radio station (97.1 FM) licensed to Holiday, Florida, United States
- WSUN-TV, a defunct television station (channel 38) in St. Petersburg, Florida, United States
- WSUN (defunct), a radio station in Tampa Bay Area, Florida, United States known as WSUN from 1927 until 2001

== Sports ==
- Connecticut Sun, a professional women's basketball team
- Gold Coast Suns, a professional Australian rules football club
- Phoenix Suns, a professional men's basketball team

== Transportation ==
- Sun (motorcycle)
- Sun-class cruise ship
- GWR Sun Class, a class of locomotives
- Sunderland station's National Rail code
- Sunny Bay station's MTR code
- Sunshine railway station, Melbourne
- Friedman Memorial Airport's IATA code

== People ==
- Sun Ra (1914–1993), American jazz musician
- Sun (surname), a Chinese surname and list of people with the surname
- Sun Tzu (disambiguation) (Chinese: 孫子; pinyin: Sun Zi; Wade–Giles: Sun Tzu; lit. 'Master Sun')
- Sun Yat-sen (1866–1925), Chinese politician and revolutionary martyr
- Sun Mingming (born 1983), Chinese former professional basketball player
- Sun Myung Moon (1920–2012), Korean founder of the Unification Church
- Ho Yeow Sun or Sun (born 1972), Singaporean Christian pop music singer
- Joe Sun (1943–2019), born James Joseph Paulsen, American country music singer-songwriter
- Karoline Rose Sun, French-German musician and actress

== Other uses ==
- Sun (heraldry), representations of the Sun as heraldic charges
- Seconda Università degli Studi di Napoli, a university in Italy
- Soul of the Ultimate Nation, an online role-playing game
- SU(n), the special unitary group of degree n, a concept in mathematics
- Cun (unit) or sun, a unit of length
- Mr. Sun, a Ni Hao Kai Lan character
- Sun, a laundry detergent from Henkel

== See also ==
- Sun FM (disambiguation)
- The Sun (disambiguation)
- Sunn, a brand of musical instrument amplifiers
- Sunn (disambiguation)
- Son (disambiguation)
- Sonne (disambiguation)
- Sol (disambiguation)
- 太陽 (disambiguation)
