= List of newspapers named Sun =

Sun or The Sun is the name of the following newspapers:

== Australia ==
- The Sun (Brisbane), formerly The Daily Sun, discontinued newspaper of News Limited
- The Sun (Sydney), a discontinued afternoon tabloid
- The Sun News-Pictorial, tabloid now merged into the Herald Sun

== Burma ==
- The Sun (Rangoon)

== Canada ==
Ordered by province

- Calgary Sun, Alberta
- Edmonton Sun, Alberta
- The Vancouver Sun, British Columbia
- Winnipeg Sun, Manitoba
- Brandon Sun, Manitoba
- Ottawa Sun, Ontario
- Toronto Sun, Ontario

== Ceylon ==
- Sun (Ceylon), a defunct Ceylonese newspaper

== Hong Kong ==
- The Sun (Hong Kong), a defunct Chinese-language newspaper
- The SUN (Hong Kong), an English-language newspaper for Filipinos

== Hungary ==
- The Budapest Sun

== Malaysia ==
- The Sun (Malaysia)

== New Zealand ==
- The Sun (New Zealand)

== Nigeria ==
- The Sun (Nigeria)

== United Kingdom ==
- The Sun (United Kingdom), a current daily national tabloid
- The Sun (1792–1876), a defunct British newspaper
- The Sun (1893–1906), a defunct British newspaper

== United States ==
Ordered by state

- The San Bernardino Sun, of California
- Sonoma Valley Sun, of California
- The Gainesville Sun, Florida
- Parsons Sun, of Kansas
- The Baltimore Sun, Maryland
- The Sun (Lowell), Massachusetts
- St. Louis Sun, Missouri (1989–1990)
- Las Vegas Sun, Nevada
- The New York Sun (2002–2008)
- The Sun (New York City) (1833–1950)
- Sun Newspapers, a chain of weekly newspapers in Ohio
- The Sun (Sheridan), Oregon
- The Westerly Sun, Rhode Island
- Grand Saline Sun, Texas
- Sun, merged with the News-Advocate in 1932 to form the Sun Advocate, Price, Utah
- Kitsap Sun, Washington
- The Sun, later called Peck's Sun, a Wisconsin newspaper founded by George Wilbur Peck
- Sun (supermarket tabloid) (1983–2012)

== See also ==
- Daily Sun (newspaper)
- The Sunday Sun (disambiguation)
- Chicago Sun-Times, Illinois, United States
- Herald Sun, Melbourne, Australia
- Sun Herald, Biloxi, Mississippi
- Sun-Sentinel, South Florida
- The Sun News, a daily newspaper published in Myrtle Beach, South Carolina
- The Sun News-Pictorial, Melbourne, Australia
- Die Son (English: "The Sun"), a daily Afrikaans-language tabloid
- Le Soleil (French for "The Sun"), a list of newspapers
