= List of newspapers named Daily Sun =

The Daily Sun is the largest daily newspaper in South Africa. Daily Sun may also refer to the following newspapers:

== United States ==
- Arizona Daily Sun, Flagstaff, Arizona
- Bowdoin Daily Sun, Connecticut, published by Bowdoin College
- Daily Sun (Warner Robins, Georgia), published from 1969 to 2003
- Waukegan Daily Sun, Illinois, published from 1897 to 1930, an ancestor of the Lake County News-Sun
- The Lewiston Daily Sun, Lewiston, Maine, published from 1896 to 1989, at which time it merged with The Daily Journal to create the Sun Journal
- The Portland Daily Sun, Portland, Maine, published from 2009 to 2014
- Hudson Daily Sun, Hudson, Massachusetts, founded in 1902, an ancestor of the Enterprise-Sun
- The Berlin Daily Sun, Berlin, New Hampshire, a free newspaper published three days a week
- The Conway Daily Sun, Conway, New Hampshire, a free newspaper
- The Laconia Daily Sun, Laconia, New Hampshire, a free newspaper
- The Cornell Daily Sun, Ithaca, New York, a Cornell University student publication
- Puerto Rico Daily Sun, San Juan, Puerto Rico, the island's only daily English-language newspaper
- Corsicana Daily Sun, Corsicana, Texas

== Other countries ==
- Daily Sun (South Africa), Johannesburg
- Daily Sun (Bangladesh), Dhaka
- The Sun (Nigeria), daily newspaper printed in Lagos, Nigeria
- The Sun (Brisbane), formerly The Daily Sun, discontinued newspaper of News Limited, Australia

== See also ==
- Daily Sun News, Sunnyside and Yakima, Washington
- The Sunday Sun
- List of newspapers named Sun
