= Sun News =

Sun News may refer to:

- The Sun News, a daily newspaper published in Myrtle Beach, South Carolina
- Sun News (Indian TV channel), a 24-hour Tamil news channel
- Sun News Network, a defunct Canadian television news channel
- Sun Newspapers, a chain of weekly newspapers in Ohio
- Sun Media, a defunct Canadian newspaper chain
- Sun (newspaper), various newspapers
