= Sea Princess (disambiguation) =

Sea Princess may refer to:

- Any of princesses from Sea Princesses, Brazilian series of children's books
- MS Dream (1998)
- MV Kungsholm (1965)
- Nickname for Tessa Prieto-Valdes
