= RV Sonne =

RV Sonne is the name of the following ships:

- RV Sonne (1968), sold to Argentina in 2014, named ARA Austral
- RV Sonne (2014), in service

== See also ==
- Sonne (disambiguation)
