= Adonia (disambiguation) =

Adonia is an ancient Greek festival.

Adonia may also refer to:

- MS Charming, a Sun-class cruise ship launched in 1998 and known as Adonia from 2003 to 2005
- MV Azamara Pursuit, an R-class cruise ship completed in 2001 and known as Adonia from 2011 to 2018
