= Sonne =

Sonne may refer to:

== Surname ==
- Alma Sonne (1884–1977), general authority of The Church of Jesus Christ of Latter-day Saints (LDS Church)
- Astrid Sonne (born 1994), Danish singer-songwriter and violinist
- Brett Sonne (born 1989), Canadian professional ice hockey centre for Dornbirner EC of the Austrian Hockey League (EBEL)
- Carl Olaf Sonne (1882-1948), Danish bacteriologist and parasitologist
- Dennis Sonne (born 1984), German politician
- Heinrich Sonne (1917–2011), recipient of the Knight's Cross of the Iron Cross, Hauptsturmführer in the Waffen-SS during World War II
- Isaiah Sonne (1887–1960), Austrian-born Jewish historian and bibliographer
- Jørgen Sonne (painter) (1801–1890), Danish painter best known for his battle paintings
- Jørgen Sonne (writer) (1925–2015), Danish lyricist and writer
- Karl Sonne (1890–1938), Swedish track and field athlete who competed in the 1912 Summer Olympics
- Niels Henry Sonne (1907–1994), noted librarian, a rare book curator, and expert on the Gutenberg Bible
- Ole Christian Saxtorph Sonne (1859–1941), Danish government minister and speaker of the Landsting, a chamber of the parliament
- Oliver Sonne (born 2000), Peruvian professional footballer
- Petrine Sonne (1870–1946), Danish stage and film actress
- Vic Carmen Sonne (born 1994), Danish actress

== Other ==
- Sonne (album), by Schiller, 2012
  - "Sonne (Schiller song), the title song
- "Sonne" (Rammstein song), 2001
- "Sonne" (Farin Urlaub song), 2005
- RV Sonne, a German research vessel retired in 2014
- RV Sonne (2014), a German research vessel
- Sonne (navigation), a World War II-era radio navigation system also known as Consol

== See also ==
- Son (disambiguation)
- Sun (disambiguation)
- Sunn (disambiguation)
