= Sun Tzu (disambiguation) =

Sun Tzu or Sunzi (fl. 6th century BC; simplified Chinese: 孙子; traditional Chinese: 孫子; pinyin: Sunzi; Wade–Giles: Sun Tzu; lit. 'Master Sun'), was a Chinese military general, strategist, and philosopher credited as the author of The Art of War.

Sun Tzu may also refer to:

- Sun Bin (fl. 4th century BC), Sun Tzu's alleged descendant who wrote Sun Bin's Art of War for Qi
- Sun Tzu or Sunzi (fl. 4th century AD), mathematician, author of Sunzi Suanjing
- Sun Tzu chess, a variation of dark chess
- Sun Tzu: War on Business (2010 TV series), a Singaporean reality show starting James Sun

== See also ==
- Sun Zi Bing Fa Yu San Shi Liu Ji (Chinese: 孙子兵法与三十六计; lit. 'Sun Tzu's Art of War and 36 Strategems'), 2020 PRC Mandarin Chinese TV series
- Sun (surname), for other masters surnamed Sun
- Master (disambiguation)
- Sun (disambiguation)
- Tzu (disambiguation)
- Zi (disambiguation)
