= Snowy Owl (Audubon) =

Engraving by naturalist and painter John James Audubon

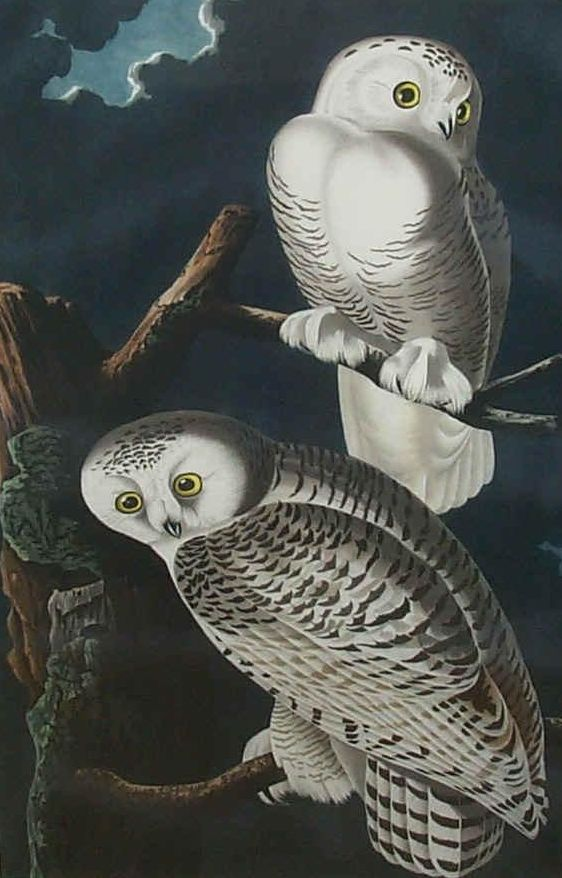
- John James Audubon's etching
- Artist: John James Audubon
- Year: 1831; 195 years ago
- Type: Engraving
- Location: In various archives, museums and collections around the world.
- Owner: University of Pittsburgh

Snowy Owl is an engraving by naturalist and painter John James Audubon. It was printed full size and is an early illustration of a snowy owl and part of The Birds of America. It was first published as part of a series in sections around 1831. This specific engraving of the snowy owl, like others in The Birds of America, consists of a hand-coloured engraving, made from copper engraved plates, measuring around 39 by 26 inches (99 by 66 cm). The same book includes images of six now-extinct birds. Art historians describe the quality of Audubon's work as being high and printed with "artistic finesse".

The plant life backgrounds of this engraving were done by Audubon's assistants and Joseph Mason but they are not credited in the book. The piece was created by shooting the owls and then painting them after Audubon set them into poses. He then directed the production of the printing plate based upon his painting. Audubon included details on the bird itself in his Ornithological Biographies. The Snowy Owl engraving was made by Robert Havell. The original prints were printed on J. Whatman watermarked paper. The border of the image is labelled "Snowy Owl (No. 25, Plate CXXI)" and "Strix Nyctea". On the lower left is written "Drawn from Nature by J. J. Audubon F.R.S.F.L.S." "Engraved, Printed & Coloured by R.R.Havell, London" appears on the lower right.

== Background publication history ==
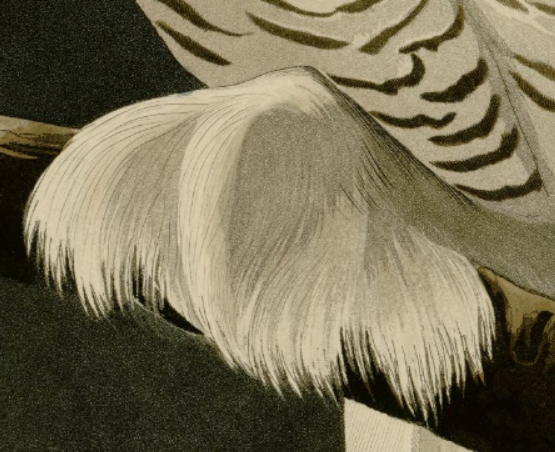
This is a detailed and enlarged image of Audubon's engraving, Snowy Owl. It shows the details of the etching of the owl's foot.

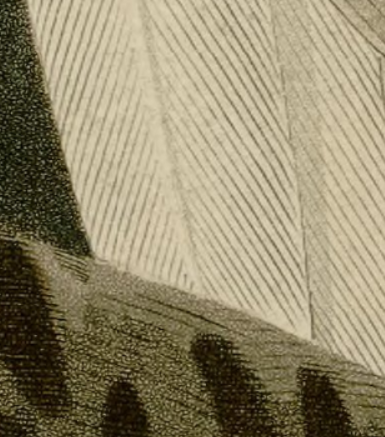
This is a detailed and enlarged image of Audubon's engraving, Snowy Owl. The original piece is life sized. It shows the details of the etching of the owl's feathers.

Though Audubon typically used oil colours, for this piece he used watercolours and pastel crayons (and occasionally pencil, charcoal, chalk, gouache, and pen and ink). His first depiction of the snowy owl was done in pastels in 1809. The Snowy Owl was part of the original edition of The Birds of America (sometimes called the Havell Edition after its printer, and sometimes called the "Double Elephant Folio", because of its size). It was printed on handmade paper 39.5 inches tall by 28.5 inches wide (100.3 × 72.4 cm). The principal printing technique was copperplate etching, but engraving and aquatint were also used. Colourists applied each colour in an assembly-line fashion (over fifty were hired for the work). He was able to sell the Snowy Owl engravings to his wealthy patrons as part of The Birds of America.

Audubon described the snowy owl in his Ornithological Biographies, which he wrote with Scottish naturalist and ornithologist William MacGillivray. Part of his role as a naturalist was his examination of the stomach contents of owls. As was his habit, Audubon included his assessment of the owl's use as a food source. He stated that snowy owls were "not indelicate eating".

== Critique ==
One art historian described the piece, as an image that depicts the owls as "...gazing directly into the eyes of the observer." The owls stand out from their dark background, as a developing winter storm is seen behind them. Though Audubon depicted the birds perched on the branch of the tree, the owls do not typically use trees as perches since much of their hunting ground is tundra and lacks trees. The female bird is realistically displayed as being larger than the male.

== Public exhibitions ==
The Snowy Owl engraving has displayed individually and as part of exhibitions of The Birds of America by the following organizations:

- University of Michigan, Ann Arbor
- Louisiana State University
- University of Pittsburgh
- Teylers Museum
- New-York Historical Society

== Collections and archives ==
- The Darlington Collection
- Meisei University
- Trinity College

== Bibliography ==
- Rhodes, Richard (2004). John James Audubon: The Making of an American. New York: Alfred A. Knopf. ISBN 0-375-41412-6
- Olson, Roberta (2012). Audubon's Aviary: The Original Watercolors for The Birds of America. New York: New-York Historical Society Skira Rizzoli. ISBN 9780847834839.
- Davis, Duff (2003). Audubon's elephant. London: Weidenfeld & Nicolson. ISBN 9780297829676.
