= Pacific World =

Cruise ship

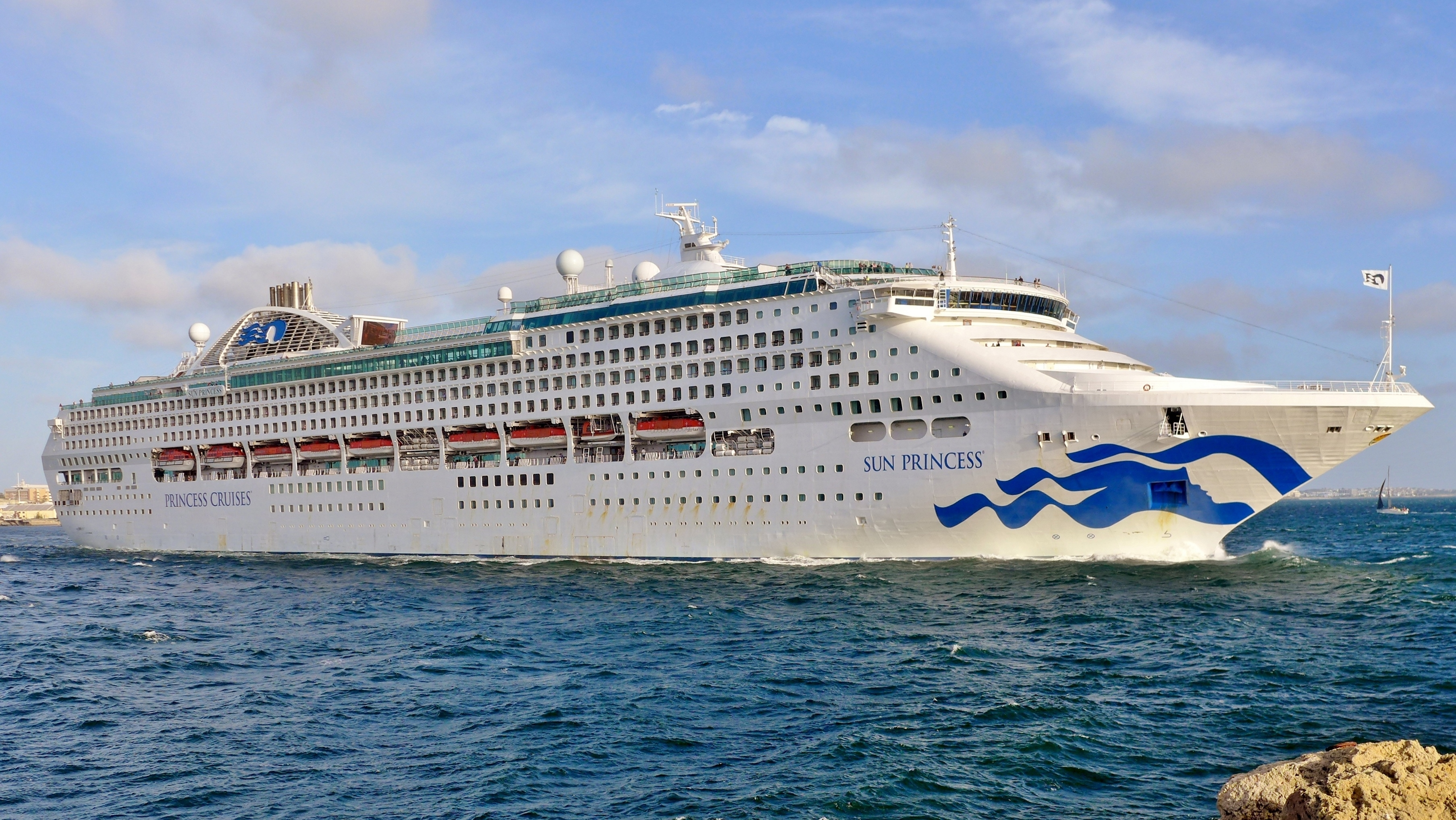
- Pacific World as Sun Princess leaving Fremantle Harbour, Australia 2018

History
- Name: Sun Princess (1995–2020); Pacific World (2020–present)
- Owner: Carnival Corporation & plc (1995–2020); Peace Boat (2020–present)
- Operator: Princess Cruise Line (1995–2020); Peace Boat (2020–present)
- Port of registry: 1995–2000: Monrovia, Liberia; 2000–2004: London, United Kingdom; 2004–2020: Hamilton, Bermuda; 2020–present Panama City, Panama
- Builder: Fincantieri, Monfalcone, Italy
- Cost: US$300 million
- Yard number: 5909
- Launched: 21 January 1995
- Completed: 8 November 1995
- Maiden voyage: 2 December 1995
- In service: 1995–present
- Identification: Call sign: ZCBU6; IMO number: 9000259; MMSI number: 310438000
- Status: In service

General characteristics
- Class & type: Sun-class cruise ship
- Tonnage: 77,000 GT; 44,193 NT; 8,293 DWT
- Length: 261.31 m (857 ft 4 in)
- Beam: 32.25 m (105 ft 10 in)
- Draught: 8.10 m (26 ft 7 in)
- Decks: 15 (10 passenger)
- Deck clearance: 32.08 m (105 ft 3 in)
- Installed power: Diesel-electric 28,000 kW (38,000 hp)
- Propulsion: Two propellers
- Speed: 22.40 knots (41.48 km/h; 25.78 mph)
- Capacity: 2,010 passengers
- Crew: 924

Pacific World (previously Sun Princess) is a Sun-class cruise ship built in 1995 and operated by Peace Boat. At the time of her construction, she was one of the largest cruise ships in the world. She was the lead ship of her class that included sister ships Dream of Tianjin Orient International Cruise Line, Star Voyager of StarCruises, and Queen of the Oceans of Seajets'.

Sun Princess was the ship featured from 1998 to 1999 on the television series, Love Boat: The Next Wave starring Robert Urich. She made the news in October 2007 as the largest ship to ever cross beneath the Sydney Harbour Bridge while entering the harbor for the first time, with a vertical clearance of approximately 2.5 m (8 ft 2 in) to spare at low tide.

In July 2018, Sun Princess underwent a two-week dry dock. She received new livery design, new stateroom category, shops, and other onboard amenities.

In September 2020, Sun Princess was sold to Peace Boat. The Sun Princess was renamed Pacific World.

== Ports of call ==
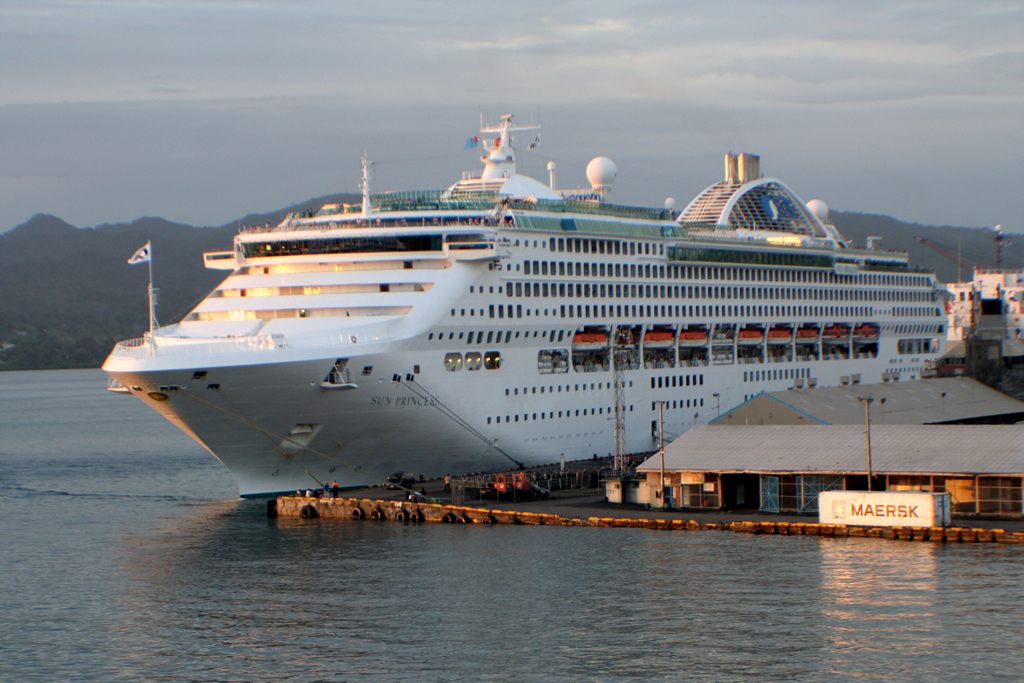
Sun Princess docked at the Kings Wharf, Suva, Fiji

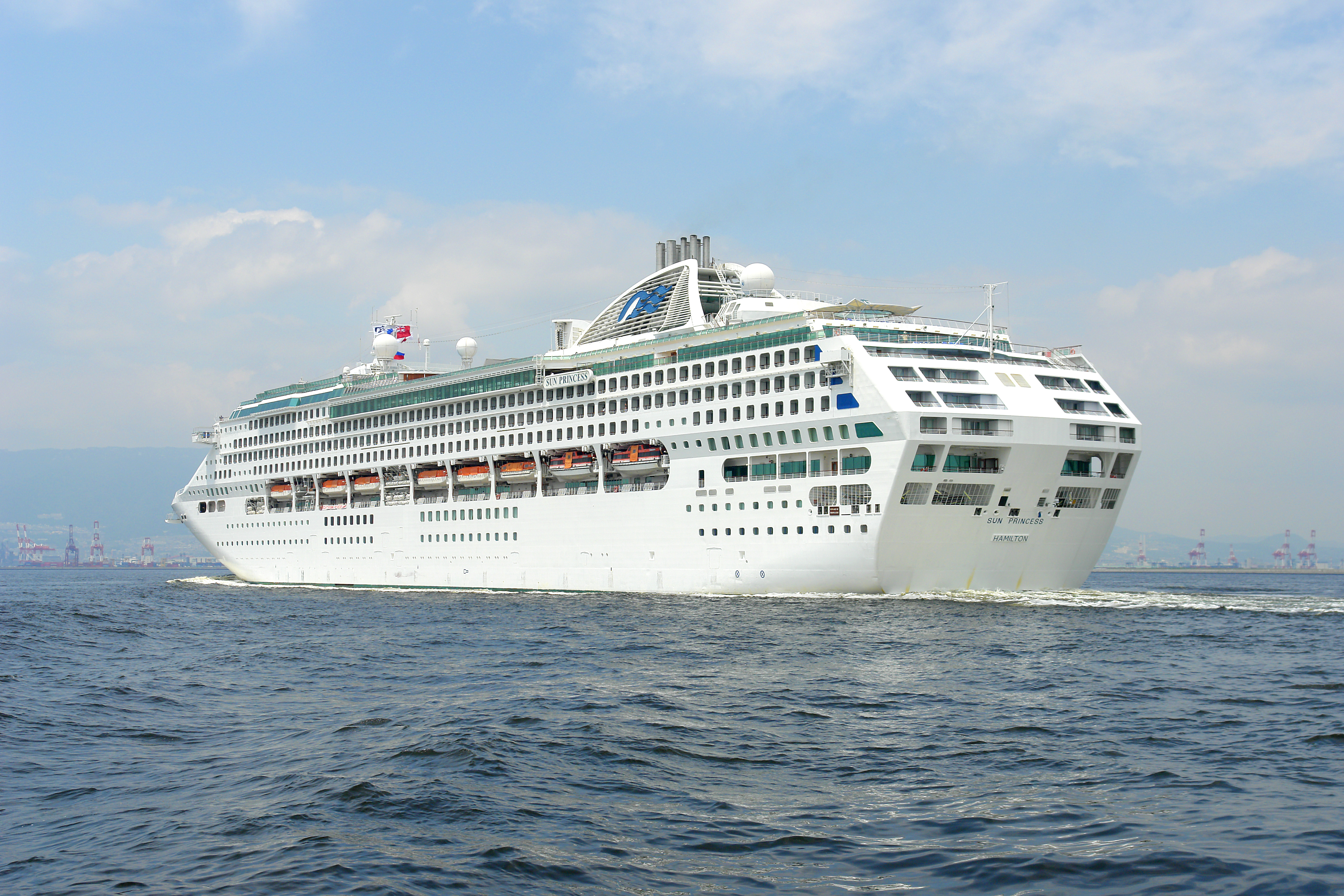
Sun Princess in the Port of Kobe, Japan

From its debut in 1995 until 2007, Sun Princess primarily served Caribbean and Alaskan cruise routes.

Since November 2007, Sun Princess has been seasonally based at Sydney, Australia. Cruises offered from that time circumnavigations Australia, circumnavigations New Zealand, and visits to New Caledonia and Vanuatu. In 2012, she offered her first world cruise.

In April 2008, Sun Princess was based in Australia, operating out of Sydney during the winter months, and from Melbourne during the summer months. For the 2008/2009 season the cruise program included Australian circumnavigations, Fremantle - Malacca Straits return, Melbourne - New Zealand / South Pacific. Sun Princess also sailed from Sydney for Melbourne plus Whitsundays return, a Japan return itinerary, and a 75 night Grand Pacific trip.

During summer 2008/2009 whilst Sun Princess was operating out of Melbourne, she was joined by Dawn Princess operating out of Sydney. Dawn Princess was also permanently based in Australia from that time which was a change from Princess Cruises' original plans.

Demand for Sun Princess cruises between Sydney and Fremantle and beyond from April to June 2008 was so strong that Princess Cruises scheduled additional sailings for 2009. The company also decided to base the vessel in Fremantle from April to August that year. Despite the availability of cheap domestic air connections, many customers booking Sun Princess voyages between Sydney and Fremantle in 2009 opted instead to extend their trips by traveling across Australia on a connecting Indian Pacific rail service.

Cruises on Sun Princess from Fremantle in 2009 included the first Indian Ocean voyage of its kind from Australia. A 46-night sailing from Fremantle visited Singapore, Malaysia, Thailand, India, the Maldives, the Seychelles, South Africa, Madagascar, Mauritius and Réunion.

In 2013, Sun Princess sailed round-trip cruises from Tokyo, Japan marking the first of Princess Cruises deployments from there. In 2014, she sailed an extended Japan cruise program, sailing from Otaru, Hokkaido and Kobe. She was joined by Diamond Princess which replaced her Tokyo sailings.

In 2019-2020 cruise season, Sun Princess sailed an extended Western Australia program. The ship homeported in Fremantle, Australia for 141 days.

It was announced in June 2018 that Sun Princess would be used as a floating hotel for the 2020 Tokyo Olympics. The ship was to be docked at Tokyo's Yokohama Port between 23 July and 9 August 2020, specifically to provide more hotel room space for Olympic guests. It was estimated that the ship would receive 36,000 overnight stays during the Tokyo Olympics.

== Accidents and incidents ==
In October 2013, a 73-year-old man "disappeared" while the ship was on a 16-day cruise from Fremantle to Sydney. The wife of the man reported him missing. The search included: three aircraft and the Royal Australian Navy ship HMAS Maryborough in an area just north of Cape Londonderry. As of 8 October 2013 the missing passenger had not been found.

In November 2014, an 84-year-old man fell overboard off the coast of Sydney. The ship was returning to White Bay in Sydney after a 13-day New Zealand cruise.

On 6 September 2017, a pipe burst onboard Sun Princess causing flooding to the lower decks affecting passengers in their cabins.

Outbreaks of gastroenteritis occurred repeatedly on cruises in 2016 and 2017.

=== COVID-19 pandemic ===
Princess Cruises ship was not allowed to dock at a port in Madagascar on 13 February 2020 as it had visited Thailand, where there were cases of SARS-CoV-2, less than 14 days before. The ship docked at Réunion on 1 March, but passengers were met by a crowd of about 30 people who insisted that the passengers must be inspected for SARS-CoV-2, and tried to prevent them from leaving the port area. Objects were thrown at passengers, and the police deployed tear gas. Princess Cruises said that there were no concerns of SARS-CoV-2 on the ship.

On 26 March 2020, the Department of Health of Western Australia announced that a passenger from Sun Princess had tested positive for the virus. (Note: Technically, the Department of Health's announcement on 26 March 2020 stated that "four [people who tested positive] are passengers from cruise ships including the Ruby Princess, Sun Princess and Voyager of the Seas", so there may have been two passengers from Sun Princess who tested positive by this date.)
