= MS Star Voyager =

Cruise ship built in 1997

Star Voyager
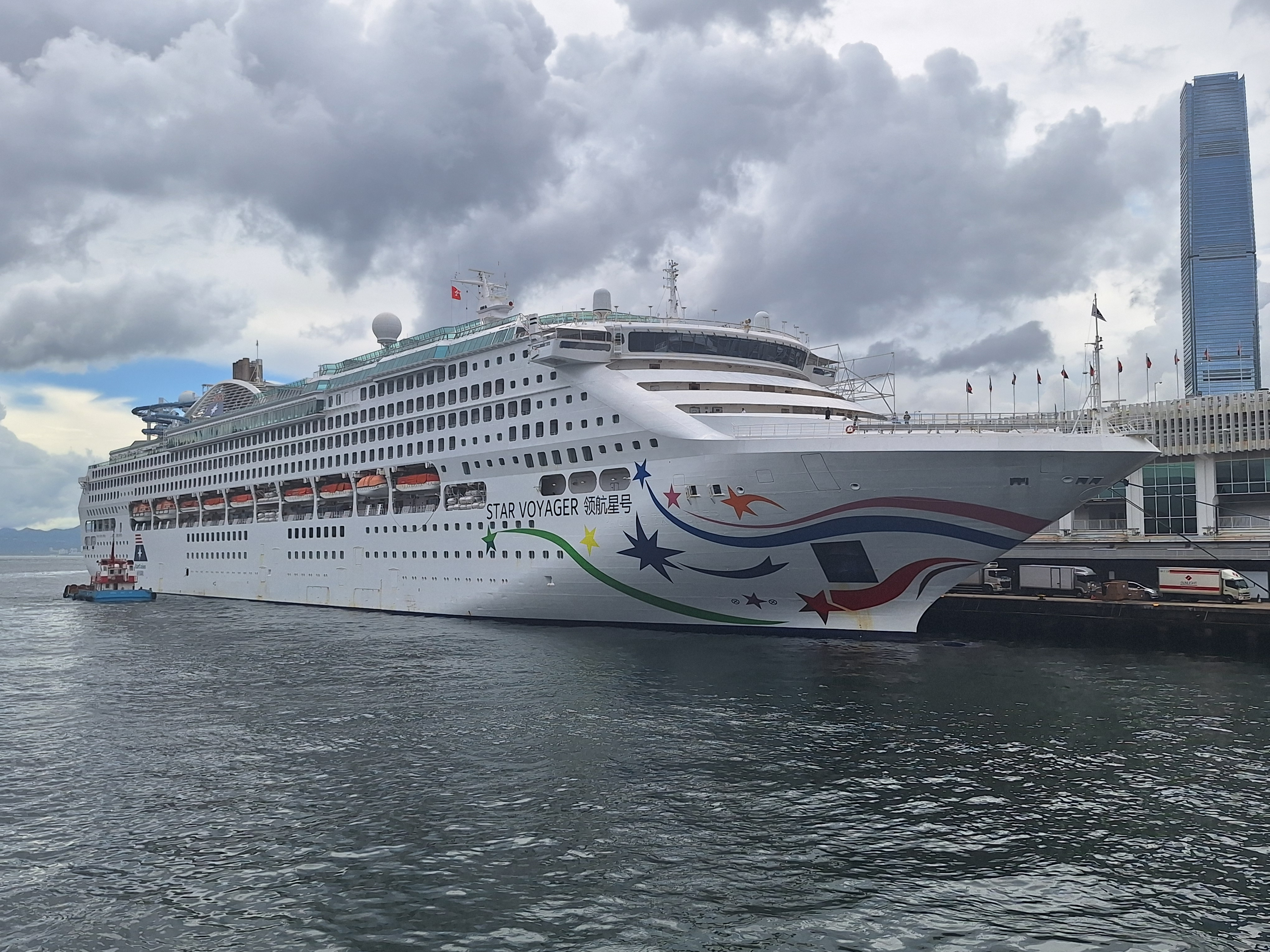
- Star Voyager at Hong Kong on 27 June 2025

History
- Name: Dawn Princess (1997–2017); Pacific Explorer (2017–2025); Star Voyager (since 2025)
- Owner: Carnival Corporation & plc (1997–2025); Probiz Investments LTD (since 2025)
- Operator: Princess Cruises (1997–2017); P&O Cruises Australia (2017–2025); StarCruises (since 2025)
- Port of registry: (Liberia) Monrovia (1997–2000); (Bermuda) Hamilton (2000–2017); (United Kingdom) London (2017–2025); (The Bahamas) Nassau (since 2025)
- Builder: Fincantieri, Monfalcone, Italy
- Cost: US$300 million
- Yard number: 5955
- Launched: 11 July 1996
- Maiden voyage: 10 May 1997
- Refit: June 2009
- Identification: Call sign: MAQK9; IMO number: 9103996; MMSI number: 310437000
- Status: In service

General characteristics
- Class & type: Sun-class cruise ship
- Tonnage: 77,441 GT; 8,293 DWT
- Length: 856 ft (261 m)
- Beam: 105.6 ft (32.2 m)
- Draught: 27 ft (8.2 m)
- Decks: 10 passenger decks
- Deck clearance: 10 ft 6.3 in (3.208 m)
- Installed power: 46,080 kW (61,790 hp) (combined)
- Propulsion: Diesel-electric; two shafts
- Speed: 21 knots (39 km/h; 24 mph) (maximum)
- Capacity: 1,998 passengers
- Crew: 924

Star Voyager (previously known as Dawn Princess and Pacific Explorer) is a Sun-class cruise ship operated by StarCruises, having previously been operated by Princess Cruises and P&O Cruises Australia. She was built by Fincantieri at their yard in Monfalcone, Italy, in 1997, and features eight restaurants, four swimming pools, five hot tubs/spas/whirlpools, seven lounges and bars, and two children centres.

She is the sister ship to Pacific World, Queen of the Oceans and Dream. Star Voyager and Pacific World differ from Queen of the Oceans and Dream by having exterior bridge wings. Queen of the Oceans and Dream have internal bridge wings.

== Ship history ==
=== Princess Cruises ===
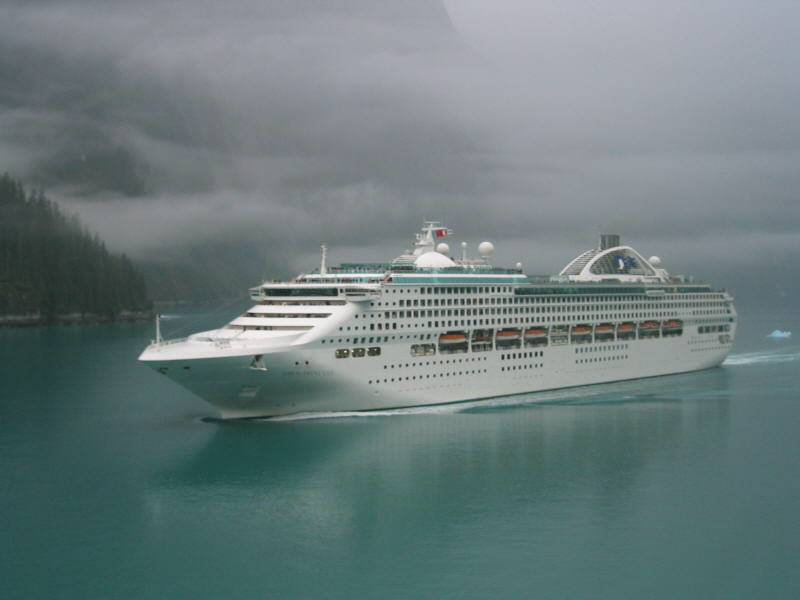
Dawn Princess in Tracy Arm Fjord, Alaska, United States. Taken in 2006 from Sun Princess

In 2001, while operating in Alaska's Glacier Bay National Park, Dawn Princess struck and killed a humpback whale while travelling too fast through the protected waters. Princess Cruises was later charged and found guilty in United States federal court and paid a fine and restitution totalling US$750,000.

Dawn Princess was targeted to replace Pacific Princess, sailing Australian waters between October 2006 and March 2007, to become the largest ship ever to be based in Australia, but these plans were eventually replaced by Sun Princess as well as being served by Pacific Dawn. Dawn Princess began sailing in Australia as of 24 September 2008 with a 28-day itinerary circumnavigating the country, after a month serving Hawaii, Tahiti, and the South Pacific. From this point on, Dawn Princess remained in Australia permanently sailing from Sydney, Melbourne and Perth alongside Sun Princess under the Princess brand until it was transferred to P&O Cruises Australia and renamed Pacific Explorer. In 2009, Dawn Princess underwent a refurbishment adding the "Movies Under the Stars" outdoor theatre and an adults-only area.

On 7 October 2015, Carnival announced that Dawn Princess would be transferred in May 2017 to its Australian subsidiary P&O Cruises Australia as Pacific Explorer. Dawn Princess entered drydock on 26 May 2017 at Sembawang, Singapore, for conversion to Pacific Explorer.

=== P&O Cruises Australia ===
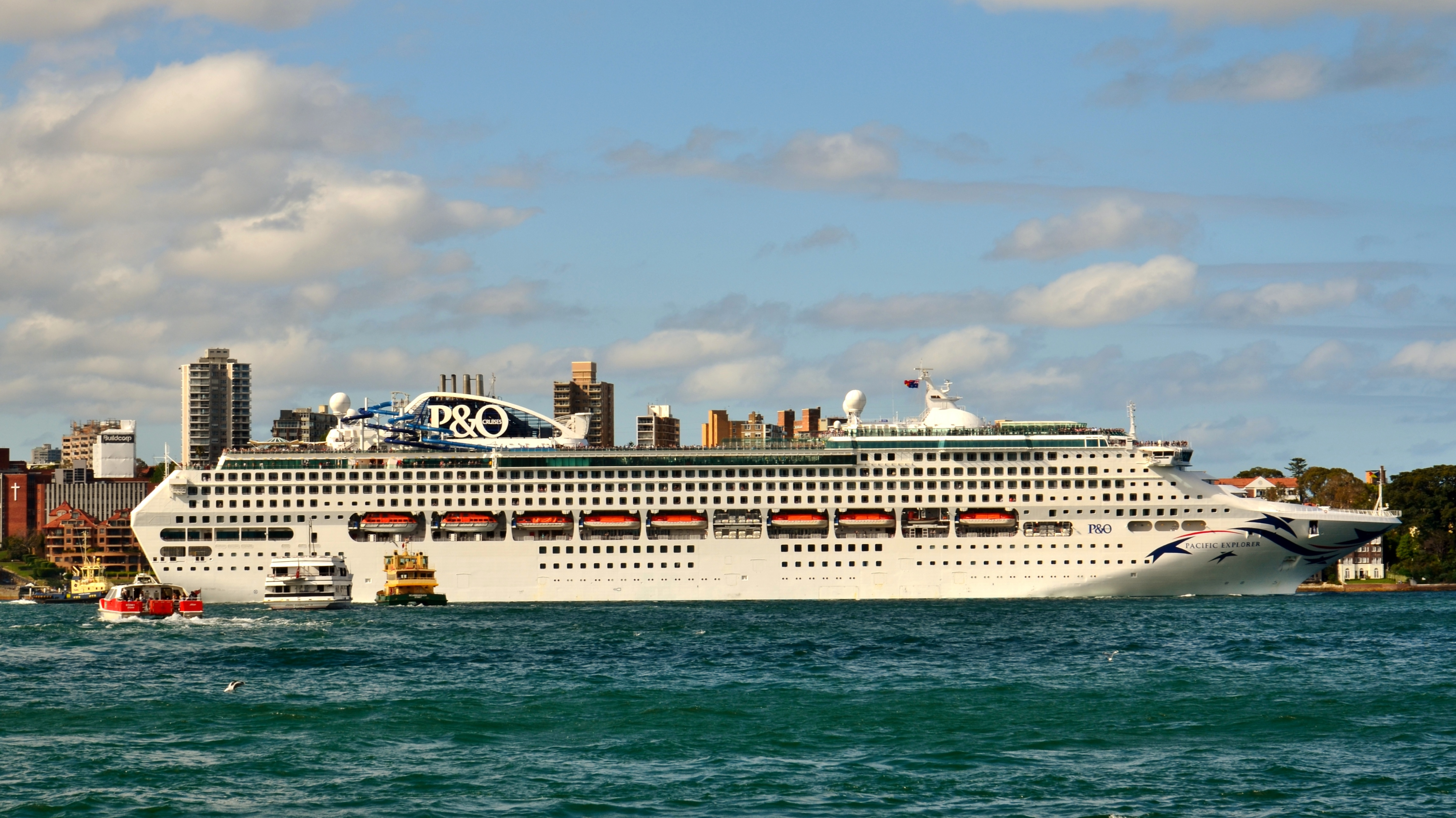
Pacific Explorer at Sydney, Australia in 2017

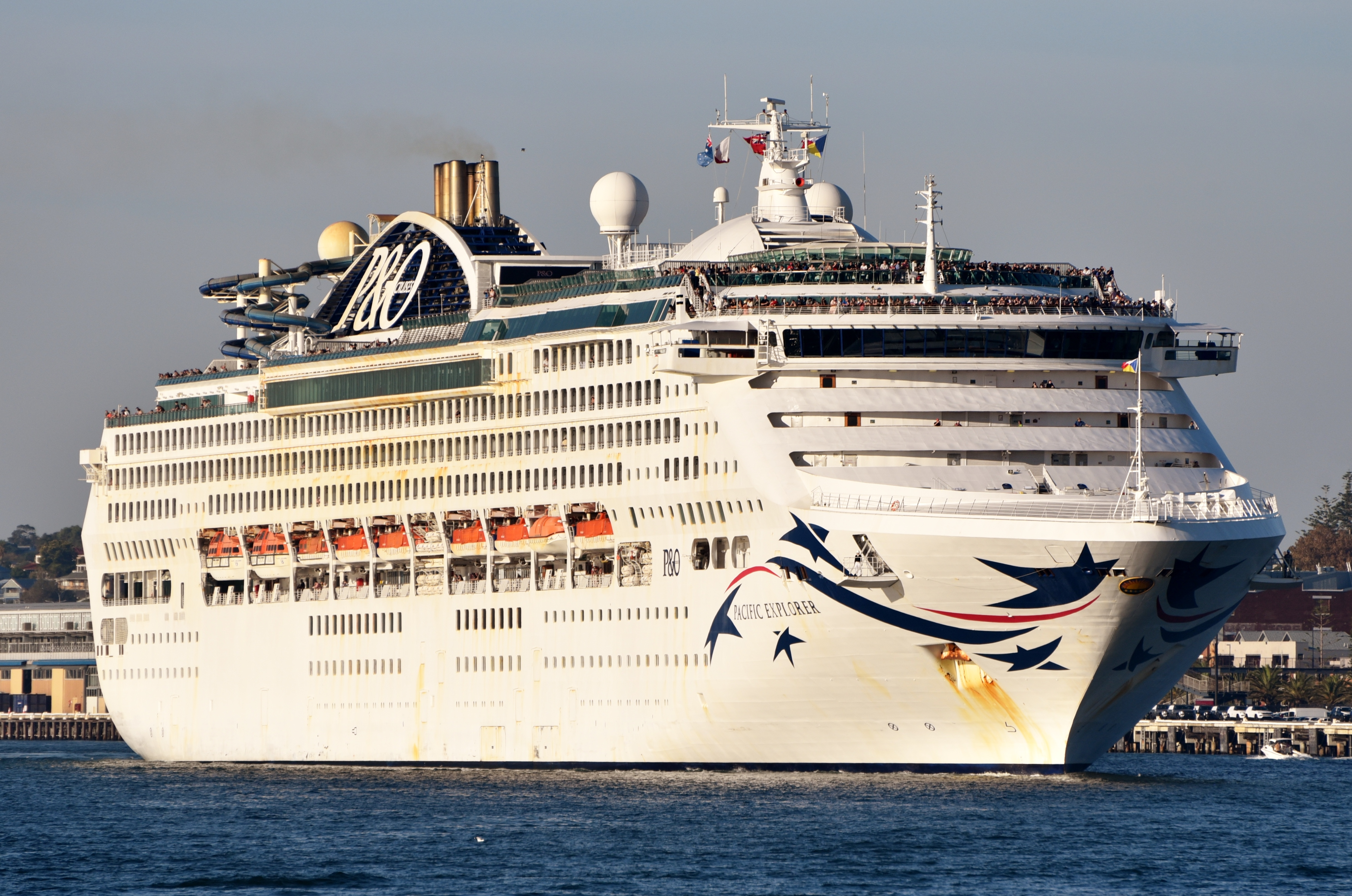
Star Voyager as Pacific Explorer leaving Fremantle, Australia on 22 April 2023

Pacific Explorer was re-registered to the United Kingdom and arrived at Sydney on 19 June 2017 for a three-day stay before conducting her maiden voyage to the Pacific islands. She was re-christened by the Nickelodeon Studios character Dora the Explorer on 2 July at Sydney Overseas Passenger Terminal after arriving from her maiden voyage.

On 2 June 2022, Pacific Explorer was the first cruise ship to use the new Brisbane International Cruise Terminal. On 13 December 2022, a woman fell overboard between Melbourne and Kangaroo Island, triggering a search off the coast of South Australia. Her body was found several hours later, and a joint investigation by South Australia Police and Victoria Police was initiated.

In April 2023, the ship sailed from Fremantle to Exmouth to allow passengers and astronomers to witness the hybrid solar eclipse. On board were numerous scientists.

In June 2024 Carnival Corporation announced Pacific Explorer would leave the P&O Australia fleet in 2025 as part of the planned shutdown of the P&O brand in Australia. In December 2024, during a Christmas-themed parade, eight staff members dressed in costumes that allegedly resembled the Ku Klux Klan (KKK) headgear. P&O Cruises Australia said that the pointed white hoods were "upside-down snow cones", not the KKK.

=== Star Cruises ===
In February 2025, Resorts World Cruises announced it would acquire the ship in March and, though briefly named Star Scorpio, instead would be renamed Star Voyager.
