= Sunn (disambiguation) =

Sunn is a brand of musical instrument amplifiers.

Sunn may also refer to:

- Sunn O))), an American drone metal band
- Crotalaria juncea, known as sunn or sunn hemp, a tropical Asian plant of the legume family
- SUNN, a solar car
- Sunn pest, an insect pest of cereal crops
- "Sunn", a song by Zoheb Hassan from the 1983 album Young Tarang
- Sunn (born Hwang Ji-won, 2000), member of South Korean girl groups Good Day and Cignature

== See also ==
- Sun (disambiguation)
- Son (disambiguation)
- Sonne (disambiguation)
