= RV Sonne (1968) =

Ship built in 1968

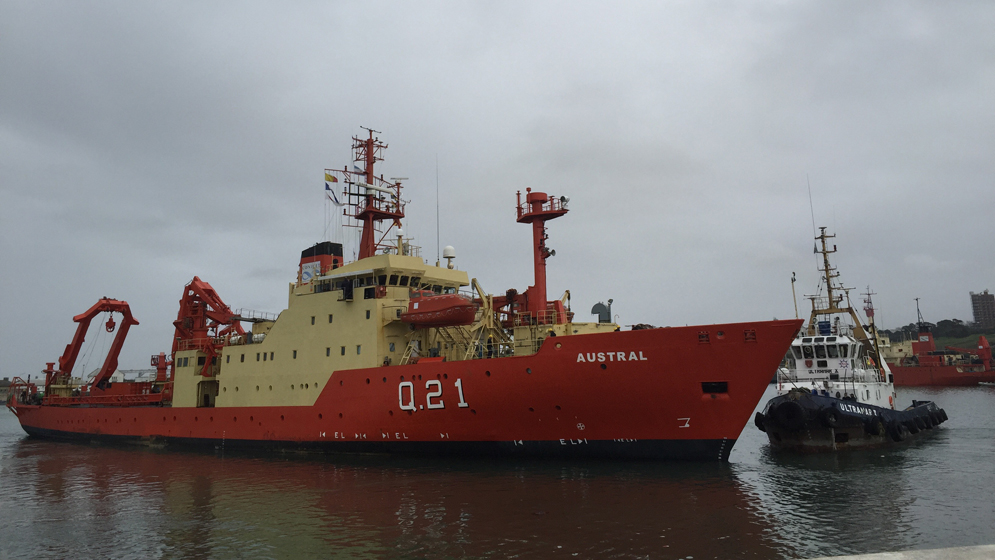
- Sonne as ARA Austral

History

Germany
- Name: Sonne
- Operator: RF Forschungsschiffahrt GmbH
- Port of registry: Bremen, Germany
- Route: Pacific Ocean, Indian Ocean
- Builder: Rickmers Werft, Bremerhaven, Germany
- Laid down: August 1968
- Launched: 18 December 1968
- Out of service: August 2014
- Identification: IMO number: 6909777; Call sign: DFCG
- Fate: Sold to Argentina

Argentina
- Name: Austral
- Owner: CONICET
- Operator: Argentine Navy
- Cost: $54,192,935 ARS, €5,150,000
- Acquired: 12 December 2014
- In service: 7 November 2015
- Identification: IMO number: 6909777; MMSI number: 701833000; Callsign: LOCY
- Status: Active as of 2018

General characteristics
- Class & type: Research vessel
- Displacement: 4,952 t (4,874 long tons)
- Length: 97.61 m (320 ft 3 in)
- Beam: 14.20 m (46 ft 7 in)
- Draught: 6.80 m (22 ft 4 in)
- Installed power: 2 × 1,150 kW electrical engines; 3 × 1,600 kW diesel-generator
- Propulsion: MaK 8 M 282 Diesel-electrical system
- Speed: 12.0 knots (22.2 km/h)
- Crew: 25 + 25 scientists

RV Sonne (German for 'Sun') is a former German fishing trawler converted into a research vessel by Schichau Unterweser AG, doing mostly geoscience-related work for a variety of commercial and scientific clients. She was registered in Bremen. In 2015 she was sold to the Argentine institute CONICET and was renamed ARA Austral (Q-21). A new geoscientific research ship, also called RV Sonne, replaced her role in Germany that same year.

== Career ==
Rickmers Werft built Sonne in 1969 as a stern trawler and delivered her to Hochseefischerei Nordstern. From her homeport of Bremerhaven she operated mainly in the waters around Iceland, Greenland and Labrador.

Sonne was converted for use in a scientific exploration role by Schichau Unterweser AG in 1977 and by Rickmers Werft in 1978. In 1991 Schichau-Seebeck-Werft lengthened and modernized her.

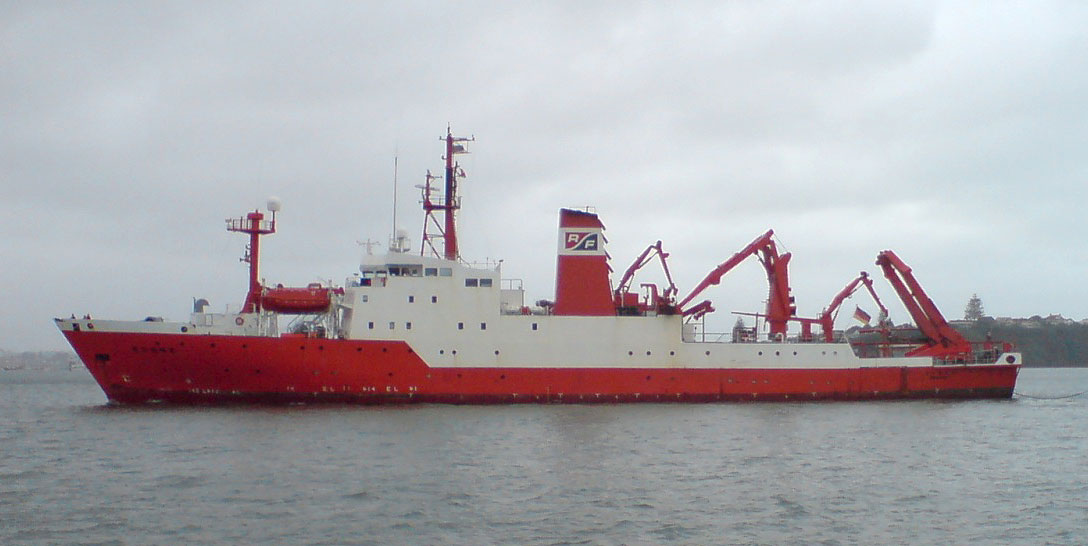
RV Sonne at Auckland, 2007

An order worth €124.4 million for a new geoscientific research ship was placed by the German federal ministry for education and research (90%) together with the coastal states Lower Saxony, Schleswig-Holstein, Mecklenburg-Vorpommern, Bremen and Hamburg (10%) in May 2011. The new ship, also called Sonne, was built in Meyer Werft in Papenburg, and replaced the old Sonne in 2015. Its launch took place on 5 April 2014.

The last German cruise of RV Sonne took place in August 2014, after which she was retired from German scientific use.

=== Argentine service ===
She was sold to the Argentinian institute CONICET for € 5.150.000 and she arrived in the Argentine Navy naval base at Mar del Plata in February 2015. In June she was renamed ARA Austral (Q-21). Austral is operated by a naval crew, on behalf of the civilian agency CONICET.

== In popular culture ==
Sonne appears in Frank Schätzing's novel The Swarm in connection with methane measurements off the Norwegian coast.

== See also ==
- RV Sonne (2014) - the successor of RV Sonne
