= MV Queen of the Oceans =

Sun-class cruise ship owned by Seajets

Queen of the Oceans
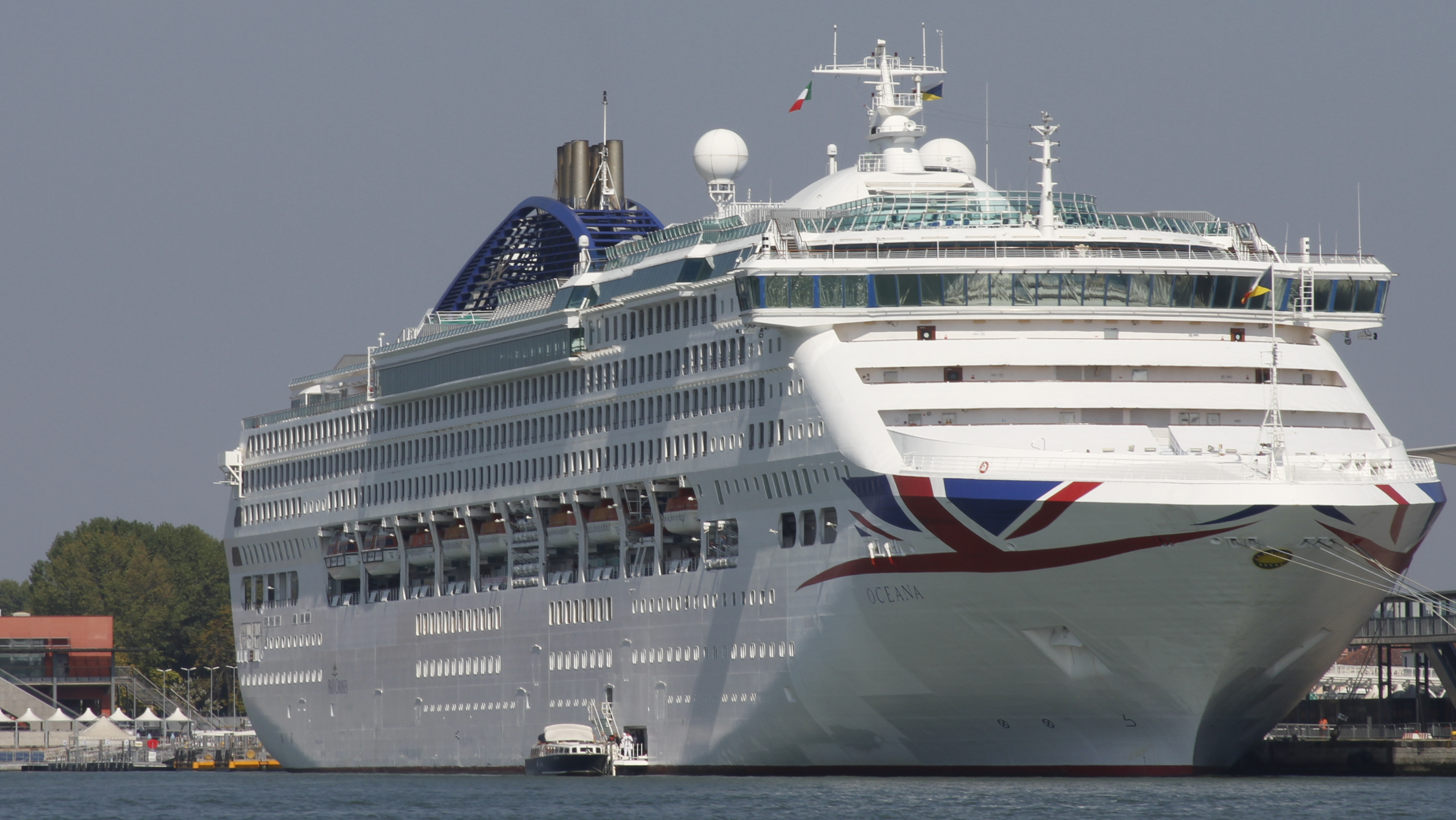
- Queen of the Oceans as Oceana in Venice, 2016

History
- Name: Ocean Princess (2000–2002); Oceana (2002–2020); Queen of the Oceans (2020–present)
- Owner: P&O Princess Cruises (2000–2003); Carnival Corporation & plc (2003–2020); Seajets (2020–present)
- Operator: Princess Cruises (2000–2002); P&O Cruises (2002–2020)
- Port of registry: 2000–2000: Liberia, Monrovia; 2000–2005: United Kingdom, London; 2005–present: Bermuda, Hamilton
- Builder: Fincantieri, Monfalcone, Italy
- Yard number: 6044
- Launched: 29 April 1999
- Christened: 20 February 2000
- Completed: 28 January 2000
- Maiden voyage: February 2000
- Out of service: July 2020
- Identification: IMO number: 9169550; Call sign: ZCDN9 (from 2005); MMSI number: 310473000 (from 2005)
- Status: Laid up at Patras since 2020.

General characteristics
- Class & type: Sun-class cruise ship
- Tonnage: 77,499 GT; 8,293 DWT
- Length: 261.30 m (857 ft 3 in)
- Beam: 32.25 m (105 ft 10 in)
- Draft: 8.10 m (26 ft 7 in)
- Decks: 11 (passenger accessible)
- Installed power: 4 × 16-cyl Sulzer-16ZAV40S diesel engines; 46,080 kW (61,790 hp) (Total power)
- Speed: 21 knots (39 km/h; 24 mph)
- Capacity: 2,016 (regular); 2,272 (maximum)
- Crew: 889

MV Queen of the Oceans is a Sun-class cruise ship owned by Seajets, a Greek/Cypriot ferry company. She was built by Fincantieri in Monfalcone, Italy, and measures 77,499 GT. She entered service in February 2000 as Ocean Princess for Princess Cruises before being transferred to P&O Cruises in 2002, operating as Oceana until 2020. Queen of the Oceans is a sister ship to other Sun-class ships, Dream, Pacific World, and Pacific Explorer.

== History ==
=== 2000–2002: Ocean Princess ===
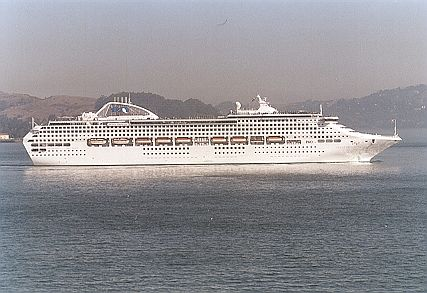
Ocean Princess in 2001

Oceana was originally ordered by P&O to serve in the Princess Cruises fleet. She was named by Ali MacGraw and Ryan O'Neal and entered service as Ocean Princess on 16 February 2000. During the winter season, Ocean Princess was positioned in the southern Caribbean, while in summer she operated in Alaskan waters. Shortly after her launch, P&O demerged its cruise ship operations and Ocean Princess came under the ownership of P&O Princess Cruises, whilst continuing to serve in the Princess Cruises fleet.

=== 2002–2020: Oceana ===
In November 2002, Ocean Princess entered service with P&O Cruises, operating from Fort Lauderdale, Florida. Her official naming ceremony took place in Southampton, England on 21 May 2003. She was christened by Anne, Princess Royal.

In 2003, P&O Princess Cruises merged with Carnival Corporation to become Carnival Corporation & plc. As a result, Oceana came under the ownership of Carnival UK, but continued to operate with the P&O Cruises fleet.

Oceana was last renovated between 29 November and 17 December 2017 after she underwent a £31 million refit at the Blohm+Voss shipyard in Hamburg. Technical work and public area refurbishment were undertaken.

On 7 July 2020, amid the COVID-19 pandemic, P&O announced that it had sold Oceana to an undisclosed buyer.

=== 2020–present: Queen of the Oceans ===
On 8 July 2020, Greek newspaper Naftemporiki reported that the Iliopoulos family, who lead Seajets, was considering purchasing Oceana to begin cruise operations. The reports were later confirmed after Oceana was delivered to Seajets on 21 July 2020 at Patras. The former Oceana was later spotted with the Union flag on her bow painted over and bearing a new name, Queen of the Oceans, while docked at Patras.

As of August 2026, the ship has never re-entered service and has remained laid up in Greece since 2020. As of September 2026, the ship is listed for sale with a price of US$95m.

== Design ==
As Oceana, the vessel had 10 passenger decks. Passenger facilities included 12 bars and four restaurants, including an open-air restaurant. Other facilities included a gym, sports court, casino, golf simulator, a spa, four swimming pools, and the main entertainment venue, a 530-seat theatre.

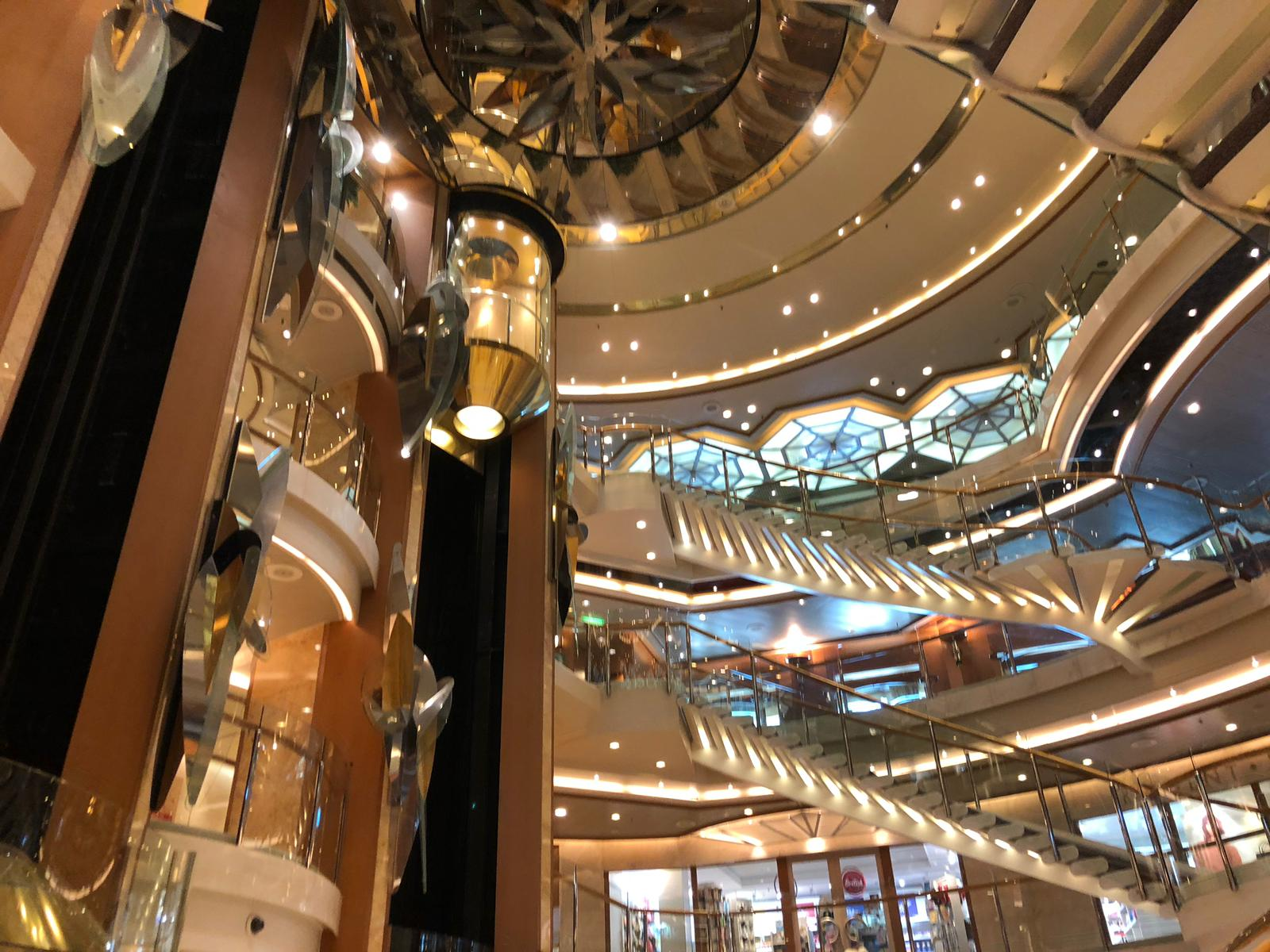
Atrium on Oceana

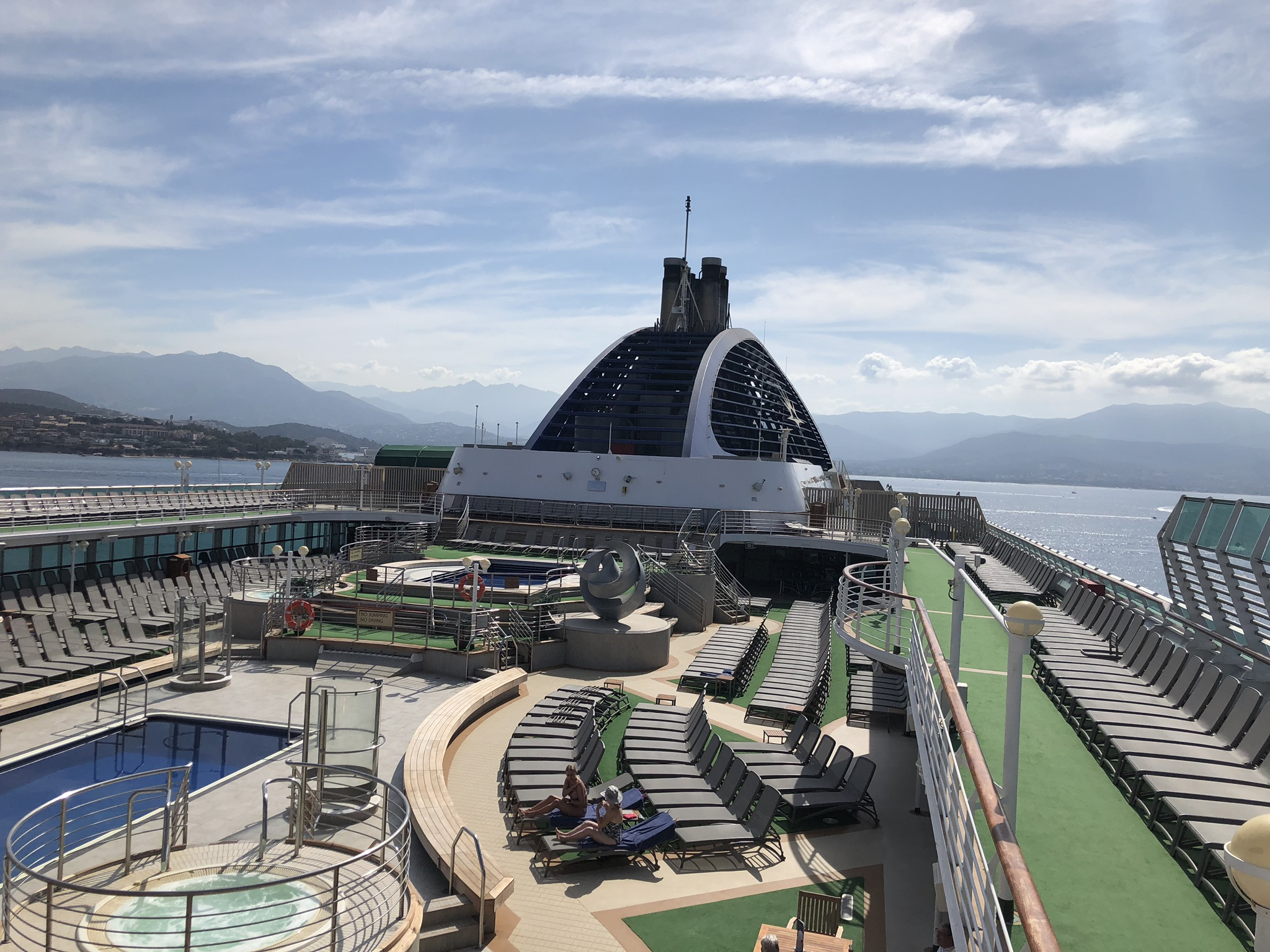
Pool deck on Oceana

== See also ==
- SS Oceana (1887)
