= Jay Pasachoff =

American astronomer (1943–2022)

- Born: Jay Myron Pasachoff; July 1, 1943; New York City, New York, U.S.
- Died: November 20, 2022 (aged 79); Williamstown, Massachusetts, U.S.
- Education: High School, Bronx High School of Science 1959
- Alma mater: AB, Harvard University 1963, AM Harvard University 1965 PHD, Harvard University 1969
- Spouse: Naomi Schwartz
- Awards: 2012 Prix-Jules–Janssen, 2017 Richtmyer Memorial Award, 2019 Klumpke-Roberts Award
- Scientific career
- Fields: Astronomy, Solar eclipses, Atmosphere of Pluto; Cosmic Deuterium
- Workplaces: Williams College, California Institute of Technology

Jay Myron Pasachoff (July 1, 1943 – November 20, 2022) was an American astronomer. Pasachoff was Field Memorial Professor of Astronomy at Williams College and the author of textbooks and tradebooks in astronomy, physics, mathematics, and other sciences.

== Biography ==
After the Bronx High School of Science, Pasachoff studied at Harvard, receiving his bachelor's degree in 1963, his master's degree in 1965, and his doctorate in 1969. His doctoral thesis was titled Fine Structure in the Solar Chromosphere. He worked at the Harvard College Observatory and Caltech before going to Williams College in 1972. His sabbaticals and other leaves have been at the University of Hawaii’s Institute for Astronomy, the Institut d'Astrophysique de Paris, the Institute for Advanced Study in Princeton, New Jersey, the Center for Astrophysics | Harvard & Smithsonian in Cambridge, Massachusetts, Caltech in Pasadena, California, and most recently at the Carnegie Observatories, also in Pasadena. He has taken a leading role in the science and history of transits of Mercury and Venus, as an analogue to exoplanet studies, leading up to the transit of Venus, and the 2016 and 2019 transits of Mercury. He has also published extensive studies on the black drop effect together with for example Glenn Schneider and Leon Golub, or William Sheehan. Jay Pasachoff on solar eclipses: "Each time is like going to the seventh game of the World Series with the score tied in the ninth inning."

Pasachoff died on November 20, 2022, at the age of 79.

== Work ==
Pasachoff observed with a wide variety of ground-based telescopes and spacecraft, and reported on those activities in writing his texts. Pasachoff carried out extensive scientific work at total solar eclipses, and championed the continued contemporary scientific value of solar eclipse research. His research was sponsored by the National Science Foundation, NASA, and the National Geographic Society. He was Chair of the Working Group on Eclipses of the International Astronomical Union of the Sun and Heliosphere Division and of the Education, Outreach, and Heritage Division. His solar work also included studies of the solar chromosphere, backed by NASA grants, using NASA spacecraft and the 1-m Swedish Solar Telescope on La Palma, Canary Islands, Spain. With Richard Cohen and his sister, Nancy Pasachoff, Pasachoff wrote in 1970 an article for Nature discussing that the belief in the supernatural such as horoscopes impede the growth of science. He collaborated with a professor of art history, Roberta J. M. Olson of the New-York Historical Society, on astronomical images in the art of Renaissance Italy, Great Britain, the U.S. (eclipse oil paintings), and elsewhere. Jay and Naomi Pasachoff wrote a review of Alexander Borodin’s solar-inspired opera for Nature produced by the New York Metropolitan Opera in 2014. Also with his wife, Naomi, Pasachoff wrote biographies of Henry Norris Russell, John Pond, Hypatia, and Edward Williams Morley for the Biographical Encyclopedia of Astronomers. Their books and other publications are listed at http://solarcorona.com as links to publishers’ websites.

Pasachoff received the 2003 Education Prize of the American Astronomical Society, "For his eloquent and informative writing of textbooks from junior high through college, For his devotion to teaching generations of students, For sharing with the world the joys of observing eclipses, For his many popular books and articles on astronomy, For his intense advocacy on behalf of science education in various forums, For his willingness to go into educational nooks where no astronomer has gone before, the AAS Education Prize is awarded to Jay M. Pasachoff." Asteroid 5100 Pasachoff recognizes Pasachoff's astronomical accomplishments. In addition to his college astronomy texts, Pasachoff wrote Peterson Field Guide to the Stars and Planets, was co-author of Peterson Field Guide to Weather, and was author or coauthor of textbooks in calculus and in physics, as well as several junior-high-school textbooks. Pasachoff received the 2012 Prix-Jules–Janssen from the Société astronomique de France,"for your outstanding research, teaching and popularisation of Astronomy, in the spirit with which Camille Flammarion created the award back in 1897." He received the 2017 Richtmyer Memorial Award from the American Association of Physics Teachers "for outstanding contributions to physics and effectively communicating those contributions to physics educators." He received the 2019 Klumpke-Roberts Award of the Astronomical Society of the Pacific "for his contributions to the public understanding and appreciation of astronomy", based in part on his role at the times of solar eclipses, when "Jay becomes astronomy's cheerleader-in-chief, allowing more and more people to become interested and engaged in the field."

Pasachoff collaborated with scientists from Williams College and MIT to observe the atmospheres of outer planets and their moons, including Pluto, its moon Charon, Neptune’s moon Triton, and other objects in the outer Solar System. He has also used radio astronomy made observations of the interstellar medium with scientists from Hofstra University and elsewhere, concentrating on deuterium.

Pasachoff was active in educational and curriculum matters. He was U.S. National Liaison to and was President (2003–2006) Commission on Education and Development, which is now Commission C1 on Astronomy Education and Development of Division C on Education, Outreach, and Heritage, of the International Astronomical Union. He was twice Chair of the Astronomy Division of the American Association for the Advancement of Science, and was on the astronomy committees of the American Astronomical Society (and its representative 2004–2013 to the AAAS), the American Physical Society, and the American Association of Physics Teachers. He was on the Council of Advisors of the Astronomy Education Review. He spearheaded a discussion of what should be taught in astronomy courses, championing the position of including and emphasizing contemporary astronomy. He was a Fellow of the American Physical Society, the International Planetarium Society, the American Association for the Advancement of Science, Committee for Skeptical Inquiry, and the Royal Astronomical Society, and he has held a Getty Fellowship. He was elected a Legacy Fellow of the American Astronomical Society in 2020.

He lectured widely, including a stint as a Sigma Xi Distinguished Lecturer. He was also Director of the Hopkins Observatory and (in rotation, currently beginning in the fall semester of 2019) Chair of the Astronomy Department at Williams.

Pasachoff was Chair of the Historical Astronomy Division of the American Astronomical Society (2013-2015). He was on the Organizing Committee for Commission C.C3 on the History of Astronomy of the International Astronomical Union (2015-2018) and on the Johannes Kepler Working Group. A catalogue of the Jay and Naomi Pasachoff rare-book collection—including works by Copernicus, Tycho, Galileo, Kepler, Newton, Fraunhofer, and Einstein—on deposit in the Chapin Library of Williams College (W. Hammond, 2014).

== Personal life ==
In 1974, Pasachoff married Naomi (née Schwartz) in a Jewish ceremony. His wife. Dr. Naomi Pasachoff (1947–), is a writer and the daughter of economist Anna Schwartz. They have two daughters, one of whom, Eloise Pasachoff, is a research Professor of law at Georgetown Law.

== Selected publications ==
- The Sun, co-authored with Leon Golub (Reaktion Books, London, for the Science Museum, London, 2017) ISBN 978-1780237572
- Cosmos: The Art and Science of the Universe, co-authored with Roberta J. M. Olson (Reaktion Books, London, and U. Chicago Books, Chicago, 2019) ISBN 978-1789140545
- Peterson Field Guide to the Stars and Planets , 4th ed. 2021 update (Houghton Mifflin Harcourt, 2016) ISBN 978-0395934319
- Peterson Field Guide to Weather with Jay Anderson and John A. Day (Houghton Mifflin Harcourt, 2021) ISBN 978-0547133317
- The Cosmos: Astronomy in the New Millennium, co-authored with Alexei V. Filippenko (5th edition, Cambridge University Press, 2019), ISBN 978-1108431385
- The Solar Corona, 2nd Edition, co-authored with Leon Golub (Cambridge University Press, 2010) ISBN 978-0-521-88201-9; 1997 1st edition
- Innovation in Astronomy Education, co-edited with Rosa M. Ros and Naomi Pasachoff (Cambridge University Press, 2008) ISBN 978-0-521-88015-2
- Peterson First Guide to Astronomy, 2nd ed. (Houghton Mifflin Harcourt, 2013)
- Teaching and Learning of Astronomy: Effective Strategies for Educators Worldwide, co-edited with John Percy (Cambridge University Press, 2005) ISBN 0-521-84262-X
- The Complete Idiot's Guide to the Sun (Alpha Books, 2003) ISBN 1-59257-074-7
- Nearest Star: The Exciting Science of Our Sun, co-authored with Leon Golub (Harvard University Press, 2001) ISBN 978-1-107-67264-2, 2nd edition, 2014, ISBN 978-0-674-00467-2 Cambridge University Press
- The Teaching of Astronomy, co-edited with John Percy (Cambridge University Press; Reprint edition, 1992) ISBN 978-0-521-84262-4
- Fire in the Sky: Comets and Meteors, the Decisive Centuries, in British Art and Science, co-authored with Roberta J. M. Olson, both beneficiaries of Getty Fellowships, (Cambridge University Press, 1998) ISBN 978-0-521-66359-5
- Earth Science, co-authored with Naomi Pasachoff and Tim Cooney (Scott Foresman, 1990) ISBN 0-673-42183-X
- Physical Science, co-authored with Naomi Pasachoff and Tim Cooney (Scott Foresman, 1990) ISBN 0-673-42184-8

== See also ==
- Asteroid 5100 Pasachoff
- Asteroid 68109 Naomipasachoff
- Richard Wolfson (physicist), co-author of a physics textbook with Pasachoff
