= Aigars Kesenfelds =

Latvian entrepreneur and investor

- Born: November 3, 1983 (age 43); Latvia
- Education: Stockholm School of Economics in Riga
- Occupations: Entrepreneur, investor
- Years active: 2008-present

Aigars Kesenfelds (born 2 November 1983) is a Latvian entrepreneur and investor, known for his contributions to the financial technology sector and various industries. He is reported to be the owner of over 100 companies in Latvia, main ultimate beneficiary in Sun Finance and owns large majority of shares in peer-to-peer lending marketplace Mintos, Mogo and a 43% stake in the Luxembourg-registered Eleving Group.

Aigars Kesenfelds is the Founder and Chairman of the Board of ALPPES Capital, a first-generation family office established in 2019 to consolidate family assets.

== Early life ==
Kesenfelds was born into a family of Latvian businessman Ivars Kesenfelds. At the age of 19, Kesenfelds managed a family-owned cinema in Liepāja, Latvia. He later studied at the Stockholm School of Economics in Riga, where he co-founded the payday loan company 4Finance in 2008.

== Business ventures ==
In 2008, Kesenfelds co-founded 4Finance, a company specializing in short-term, high-interest loans under brands like Vivus.lv, SMSCredit.lv. In 2011, 4Finance was sold to Russian billionaire Oleg Boyko for over €100 million. After selling 4Finance, Kesenfelds diversified his investments, establishing or acquiring various companies across different countries.

=== Kenya ===
In 2023, in Kenya, Sun Finance (where Kesenfelds is the main ultimate beneficiary) acquired a digital lending business Zenka Finance which offers a mobile loan app offering short-term, unsecured loans that are instantly disbursed via mobile money platforms such as M-Pesa.

=== Monego in Kosovo ===
Kesenfelds founded Monego, a financial institution in Kosovo, operating over 30 branches and serving 80,000+ customers. In December 2019, the Central Bank of Kosovo revoked Monego’s license due to concerns over high-interest rates. Kesenfelds contested the decision through legal channels.

=== Kredo in Albania ===
Kredo.al is a microcredit company operating in Albania since 2017 under the legal name ECFA. The company is 95.4% owned by AS Eleving Consumer Finance Holding.

=== Investment activities ===
In 2022, he co-founded an investment firm, Merito Partners, where he is a majority shareholder.

== Personal life ==
Kesenfelds maintains a low public profile, rarely engaging with the media. However, he has made public statements regarding Monego’s license revocation in Kosovo.
