= Sun FM =

Sun FM may refer to:

- Nation Radio North East's previous name
- Sun FM (Sri Lanka), an English language radio station based in Sri Lanka
- CICF-FM, a Canadian radio station, broadcasting at 105.7 FM in Vernon, British Columbia, using the on-air branding as 105.7 Sun FM
- CHSU-FM, a Canadian radio station, broadcasting at 99.9 FM in Kelowna, British Columbia, using the on-air branding as 99.9 Sun FM
- CJMG-FM, a Canadian radio station, broadcasting at 97.1 FM in Penticton, British Columbia, using the on-air branding as 97.1 Sun FM
- CHRX-FM, a Canadian radio station, broadcasting at 98.5 FM in generally Fort St. John, British Columbia, using the on-air branding as 98.5 Sun FM
- CKUL-FM, a Canadian radio station, formerly known as 96.5 Sun FM, but now as 96.5 Kool FM, being broadcast in Halifax, Nova Scotia
- CFPW-FM, a Canadian radio station, broadcasting at 95.7 FM in Powell River, British Columbia, using the on-air branding as 95.7 Sun FM
- CKBL-FM, a Canadian radio station in Saskatoon, Saskatchewan, formerly known as 92.9 Sun FM
- WAIL, an American radio station, broadcasting as 99.5 FM in Key West, Florida, using the on-air branding as Sun 99.5
- Suryan FM, a radio station known as the Sun Network
- Sun FM (New Zealand), a New Zealand Māori radio station
- one of several Australia radio stations included in the list of radio stations in Australia
