= Roberta Olson =

American historian of art

- Born: 1947 (age 78–79)
- Occupation: Art historian

Academic background
- Education: Princeton University

Roberta Jeanne Marie Olson (born 1947) is an American historian of art. She is the author of many books on art history and is known for her work on Italian art, on astronomy in art, and on the ornithological illustrations of John James Audubon.

== Education and career ==
Olson has a Ph.D. in art history from Princeton University. Her 1975 doctoral dissertation was Studies in the Later Works of Sandro Botticelli.

She taught at Wheaton College for 25 years; after retiring as professor emerita, she became curator of drawings at the New-York Historical Society in 2000, and then in 2021, curator of drawings emerita.

== Books ==
Olson's books include:

- Italian Drawings 1780–1890 (Indiana University Press, 1980)
- Fire and Ice: A History of Comets in Art (Walker & Co., 1985)
- Ottocento: Romanticism and Revolution in 19th-Century Italian Painting (edited, American Federation of the Arts, 1992)
- Italian Renaissance Sculpture (Thames & Hudson, 1992)
- Fire in the Sky: Comets and Meteors, the Decisive Centuries, in British Art and Science (with Jay Pasachoff, Cambridge University Press, 1998)
- The Florentine Tondo (Oxford University Press, 2000)
- The Biography of the Object in Late Medieval and Renaissance Italy (edited with Patricia Reilly and Rupert Shepherd, Blackwell, 2006)
- Drawn by New York: Six Centuries of Watercolors and Drawings at the New-York Historical Society (Giles, 2008)
- Audubon's Aviary: The Original Watercolors for The Birds of America (Skira Rizzoli, 2012)
- Making It Modern: The Folk Art Collection of Elie and Viola Nadelman (with Margaret Hofer, Giles, 2015)
- Artist in Exile: The Visual Diary of Baroness Hyde de Neuville (Giles, 2019)
- Cosmos: The Art and Science of the Universe (with Jay Pasachoff, Reaktion Books, 2019)
- Scenes of New York City: The Elie and Sarah Hirschfeld Collection (edited and contributed, Giles, 2022)
- Audubon As Artist: A New Look at The Birds of America (Reaktion Books, 2024)

== Recognition ==
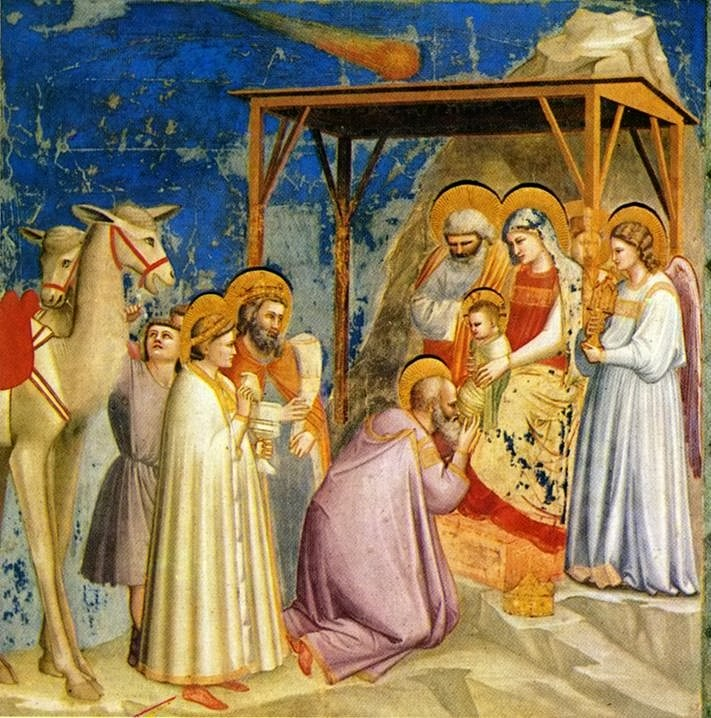
Adoration of the Magi, Giotto

Olson’s book Drawn by New York won the 2008 Association of Art Museum Curator’s Award for Excellence: Outstanding Catalogue Based on a Permanent Collection.

Olson's book Audubon’s Aviary won the 2013 Henry Allen Moe Prize for Catalogs of Distinction in the Arts of the New York State Historical Association.

Olson’s book Audubon’s Aviary won the 2013 Association of Art Museum Curator’s Award for Excellence: Outstanding Catalogue Based on a Permanent Collection.

Olson was awarded the Audubon Art Inspiring Conservation Award, John James Audubon Center at Mill Grove/Audubon Pennsylvania, 2017.

Olson’s book Making It Modern won the 2017 Frick Center for the History of Collecting’s biennial book prize for a distinguished publication on the history of collecting in America (with Margaret Hofer).

Olson received the 2020 Greater Hudson Heritage Network Award in Excellence, recognizing lifetime achievement as a curator, scholar, and advocate for New York art and history.

Minor planet 471301 Robertajmolson is named for Olson, in recognition of her identification of the star in a painting of the Adoration of the Magi by Giotto (circa 1303) as the 1301 apparition of Halley's Comet. This became the basis for naming the Giotto space mission.
