= Sun Finance =

Company based in Riga, Latvia

Sun Finance Group
- Company type: Private
- Industry: Fintech, Consumer lending
- Founded: 2017; 8 years ago
- Founder: Toms Jurjevs; Emils Latkovskis
- Headquarters: Riga, Latvia
- Area served: Latvia, Sweden, Denmark, Poland, Vietnam, Kazakhstan, Mexico
- Key people: Toms Jurjevs (CEO); Emils Latkovskis (COO)
- Products: Personal finance
- Owner: Aigars Kesenfelds (100%)
- Number of employees: 1000+
- Website: sunfinance.group

Sun Finance Group is a Latvian financial technology company operating as an online and mobile lending marketplace. The company was founded by Toms Jurjevs and Emils Latkovskis in 2017 and is headquartered in Riga, Latvia. Sun Finance is present in several countries across Europe, Asia, and Latin America.

== History ==
=== Founding ===
Jurjevs and Latkovskis established the company in Riga in 2017. Prior to founding Sun Finance Group, Jurjevs was the CEO of non-bank creditor company 4finance. His co-founder Emils Latkovskis was a former footballer, CEO of the Latvian Higher League, and a board member of the Latvian Football Federation and UEFA Futsal and Beach Soccer committee member.

=== Further development ===
In 2019, Sun Finance Group unified all of its loan originators under the Sun Finance brand. In Kazakhstan, Sun Finance sponsored youth football tournaments for the Auyl Football project in May 2021. By July 2021, Sun Finance has issued loans with the overall amount of $1 billion. On October 14, 2021, the company began trading bonds on the Nasdaq First North market of the Baltic stock exchanges. As of 2022, Sun Finance Group has 6 million registered users.

The company has been noted by the media sources and financial technology industry.

In 2023 Sun Finance was among Europe’s fastest-growing companies.

== Operations ==
Sun Finance Group engages in the operation of online loan marketplace for the consumers seeking private loans and other credit-based offerings. Its consumer segment includes micro loans, small business loans, personal loans and consumer loans.

The company operates across several regions in the countries including Sweden, Denmark, Poland, Latvia, Vietnam, Kazakhstan, and Mexico. The company provides services such as short-term loans, line of credit, and installments. Sun Finance uses data processing models that consider up to 10,000 data points to assess client risk. Sun Finance also uses Hello Soda's technology for customer identity verification.

== Financing ==
Sun Finance Group pulls its financing from sources such as bonds issued on NASDAQ and the Mintos peer-to-peer platform under the trading name SUNB110022FA. The company issued its first bonds in 2019 while had its second bond issuance in October 2020.
