= The Sunday Sun =

The Sunday Sun or Sunday Sun may refer to:

== Newspapers ==
- Sunday Sun, a regional Sunday newspaper in North East England
- Sunday Sun (South Africa), a South African Sunday newspaper
- Sun on Sunday, a Sunday edition of The Sun, a UK tabloid newspaper
- Sunday Herald Sun, Sunday edition of the Herald Sun, a regional Australian newspaper
- Sunday edition of The Baltimore Sun newspaper
- Sunday editions of Sun Media newspapers, Canadian tabloids
- The Sunday Sun (Sydney), a New South Wales newspaper, published 1903–1910

== Songs ==
- "Sunday Sun" (Neil Diamond song), a 1968 single from Velvet Gloves and Spit
- "Sunday Sun" (Beck song), a 2002 song from Sea Change

== See also ==
- Sun (disambiguation)
- The Sun (disambiguation)
- Sunday (disambiguation)
