= The Sun (Golub and Pasachoff book) =

Popular science book

- Authors: Leon Golub and Jay Pasachoff
- Language: English
- Subject: Astrophysics
- Genre: Non-fiction
- Publisher: Reaktion Books
- Publication date: July 15, 2017
- Media type: Print (Hardcover)
- Pages: 224
- ISBN: 978-1780237572

The Sun is a 2017 popular science book by Leon Golub and Jay Pasachoff. It describes the current scientific understanding of the structure of the Sun and its influence on Earth's processes. The book contains numerous illustrations, as well as tips on observing the Sun and related astronomical phenomena. It was published in the Kosmos series, which is dedicated to various objects of the Solar System.

== Authors ==
Leon Golub is a senior astrophysicist at the Smithsonian Astrophysical Observatory. Jay M. Pasachoff (1943–2022) was the Field Memorial Professor of Astronomy at Williams College. He was also the director of the Hopkins Observatory and the head of the International Astronomical Union’s Working Group on Solar Eclipses. Pasachoff authored The Peterson Field Guide to the Stars and Planets and co-authored The Cosmos: Astronomy in the New Millennium. Golub and Pasachoff have previously published two popular books on the study of the Sun: The Solar Corona and Nearest Star: The Surprising Science of Our Sun.

== Contents ==
The Sun covers various topics related to the Sun. First chapter describes sunspots and their connections to solar activity. Second and third chapters cover the Sun internal composition, including ongoing nuclear fusion and seismic activity that provides information about inner stellar structure. Further chapters describe solar chromosphere, prominences and stellar corona. Final chapter is devoted to Sun’s influence on Earth, dealing with Sun’s radiation and solar particles. Appendices give tips on observing the Sun to be used by amateur astronomers and public, especially during eclipses. Space observations are also described.

The book includes many illustrations which authors use as a focus for discussing specific topics.

== Reception ==
Reviewers have generally praised the book. The short review in Nature states that the authors present a comprehensive scientific overview of the Sun, shedding light on various solar phenomena. They describe the book as "beautifully illustrated, history-rich, and up to date." A review in American Scientist describes the book as "intriguing, accessible, and technically detailed."

In a review for BBC Sky at Night magazine, Mark Townley states that the book is written in a way which is suitable for readers without expert understanding of complex astronomical concepts. This is achieved by avoiding mathematical formulae and using everyday analogies and historical accounts. The reviewer points out that the book could have been improved by providing a detailed description of safe observing techniques and that the authors overemphasize outdated and unsafe methods, such as using smoked glass or a DVD.
