= Sun-class cruise ship =

Cruise ship class

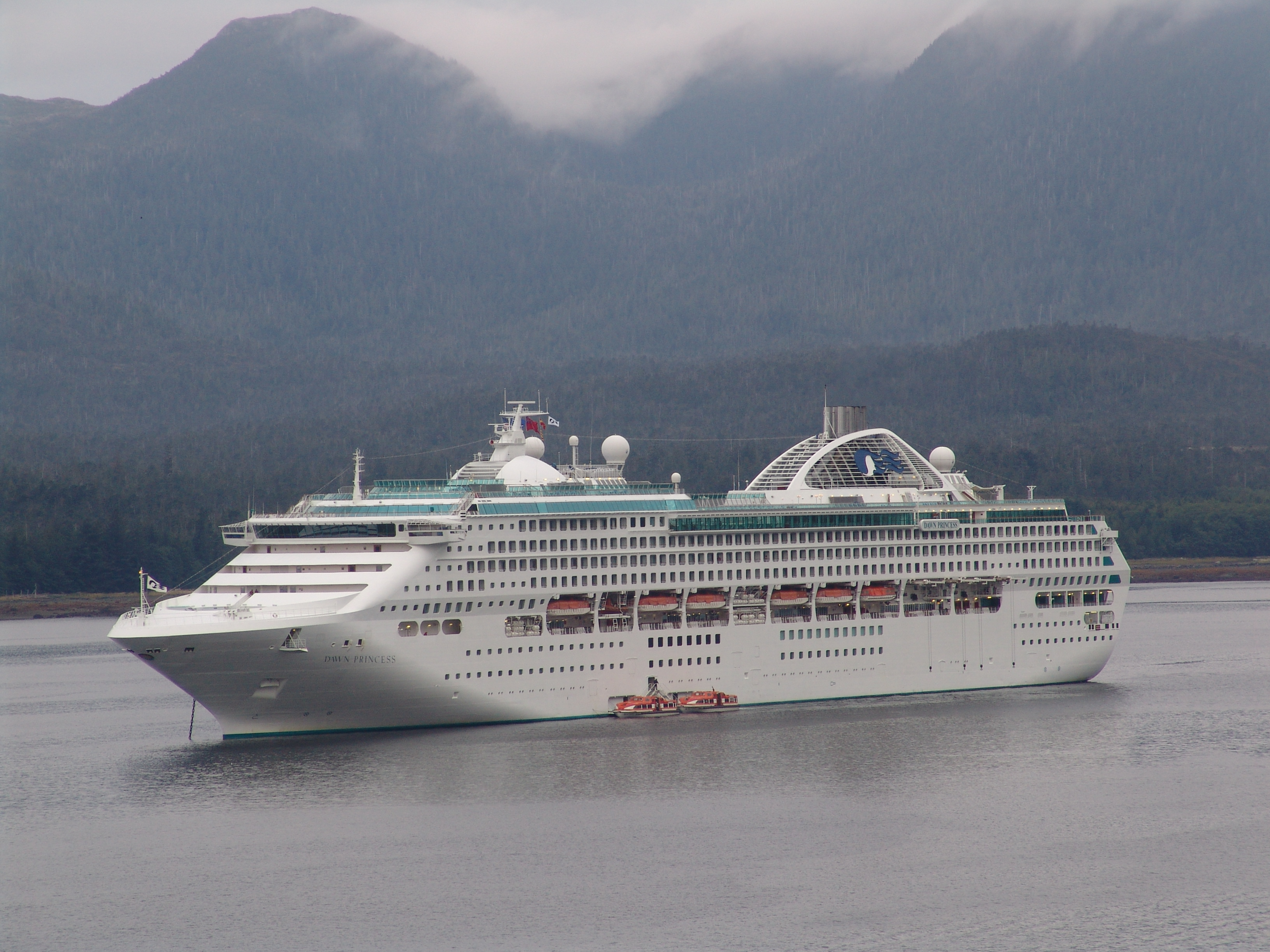
- Star Voyager (as Dawn Princess) at Ketchikan, Alaska

Class overview
- Name: Sun class
- Builders: Fincantieri – Cantieri Navali Italiani S.p.A.
- Operators: Peace Boat (1 ship); Seajets (1 ship); Cheng Zhen Cruises (1 ship); Star Cruises (1 ship)
- Preceded by: Crown class
- Succeeded by: Grand class
- Cost: US$380 million
- Built: 1995–2000
- Planned: 4
- Completed: 4
- Active: 3
- Laid up: 1

General characteristics
- Type: Cruise ship
- Tonnage: 77,741
- Length: 260.0 m (853 ft 0 in)
- Beam: 32.2 m (105 ft 8 in)
- Draught: 7.9 m (25 ft 11 in)
- Decks: 16 (10 publicly accessible)
- Propulsion: 4 Sulzer diesel engines driving 2 shafts
- Speed: 21.4 knots (39.6 km/h; 24.6 mph)
- Capacity: 1,950–2,272 passengers
- Crew: 900

The Sun class is a class of cruise ships originally built for and operated by Princess Cruises and currently operated by Star Cruises, Peace Boat, Cheng Zhen Cruises, StarCruises and Seajets (although the Seajets owned ship is not currently in active service). The vessels in the class were designed and constructed by Fincantieri Cantieri Navali Italiani in Italy. The first Sun-class vessel, Sun Princess (now Pacific World), entered service in 1995 and the last, Ocean Princess (now Queen of the Oceans) entered service in 2000. At the time of launch, the Sun class was among the largest cruise ships in the world, although this has since been surpassed.

The four ships are effectively identical, with the only notable exception being the design of the bridge wings; Pacific World and Star Voyager having exterior bridge wings. Dream and Queen of the Oceans having enclosed bridge wings.

== Ships ==
Ship	Built	Gross tonnage	Flag	Notes	Image
Pacific World	1995	77,441	Panama	In service for Peace Boat. Sun Princess from 1995 to 2020.	
Star Voyager	1997	77,441	United Kingdom	In service for Star Cruises. Dawn Princess from 1997 to 2017, Pacific Explorer from 2017 to 2025.	
Dream	1998	77,499	Liberia	In service for Cheng Zhen Cruises. Sea Princess from 1998 to 2003 and 2005 to 2020, Adonia from 2003 to 2005, Charming from 2020 to 2023.	
Queen of the Oceans	2000	77,499	Bermuda	Laid up since 2020, future unknown. Ocean Princess from 2000 to 2002, Oceana from 2002 to 2020	
