= Tzu =

Tzu or TZU may refer to the following:

- TZU, an Australian hip-hop group
- Tzu (poetry), a format of Chinese poetry
- Chinese characters (han-tzu)
- Courtesy name (tzu), a Chinese given name used later in life
- Tzu (surname), the surname of the kings of Shang China
