= The Sun (1893–1906) =

London evening newspaper

The Sun was a London evening newspaper published in England between 1893 and 1906. Intended to be a literary publication and explicitly without political allegiance, it was founded and initially edited by T. P. O'Connor. After O'Connor severed all links with the paper, it was edited by Theodore Dahl with financial support from Horatio Bottomley for the remainder of its existence.

It has no connection with the modern British newspaper of the same name.
