= The Sun (Brisbane) =

Australian newspaper

- Type: Daily afternoon newspaper
- Publisher: News Corp Australia
- Founded: 1982
- Ceased publication: 1991
- Sister newspapers: Sunday Sun

The Sun was a newspaper based in Brisbane that was published from 1982 until 1991.
