= The SUN (Hong Kong) =

English-language newspaper in Hong Kong

The SUN is an English-language newspaper based in Hong Kong, published since 1995. It targets Filipinos in Hong Kong.
