= RV Sonne (2014) =

German-built research vessel

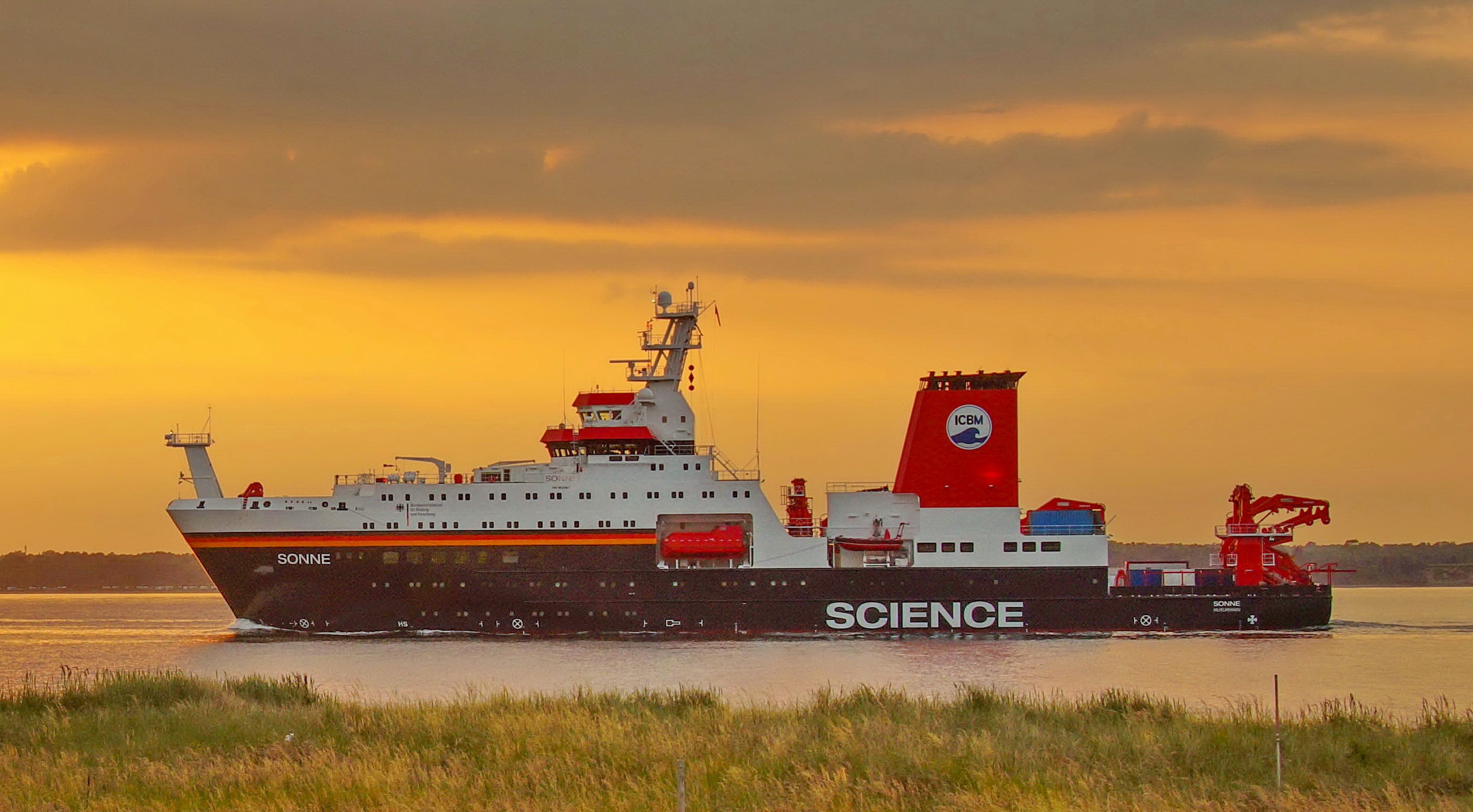
- The RV Sonne in Kiel in 2014.

History

Germany
- Name: Sonne
- Owner: Federal Ministry of Education and Research (Germany)
- Operator: Briese Schiffahrts GmbH
- Port of registry: Germany
- Builder: Meyer Werft, Germany
- Cost: €124.4 million
- Laid down: 12 April 2013
- Launched: 5 April 2014
- Christened: 11 July 2014
- Acquired: 17 November 2014
- Home port: Wilhelmshaven
- Identification: IMO number: 9633927; MMSI number: 211627240; Callsign: DBBE
- Status: Active as of 2018

General characteristics
- Class & type: Research vessel
- Tonnage: 8,554 GT; 2,566 NT
- Length: 118.42 m (388 ft 6 in)
- Beam: 20.6 m (67 ft 7 in)
- Draft: 6.4 m (21 ft 0 in)
- Depth: 9.8 m (32 ft 2 in)
- Installed power: 4 GenSets – Wärtsilä diesel engines each 1,620 kW / 1,572 ekW
- Propulsion: 2 diesel electric engines, each 2350 kW
- Speed: 15.0 knots (27.8 km/h)
- Crew: 35 + 40 scientists

RV Sonne (German for Sun) is a German deep ocean research vessel. The ship became available for science in December 2014 and it operates mainly in the Pacific and the Indian Oceans. She is registered in Wilhelmshaven and replaced its predecessor of the same name.

== Career ==
An order worth €124.4 million for a new research ship to replace the older research ship Sonne was placed by the German federal ministry for education and research (90%) together with the coastal states Lower Saxony, Schleswig-Holstein, Mecklenburg-Vorpommern, Bremen and Hamburg (10%) in May 2011.

The construction took place in Meyer Werft in Papenburg and the Sonne left the dock in April 2014. It was christened in July 2014 and handed over in November 2014.

The Sonne is a multipurpose working platform for marine and related disciplines: physical and biological oceanography, marine geology, marine and atmospheric chemistry, marine geophysics and meteorology. The ship operates mainly in the Pacific and the Indian Oceans and is owned by the German Federal Ministry of Education and Research. It sails under the German Federal State Flag and its home institute is the Institute for Chemistry and Biology of the Marine Environment.

== Equipment ==
RV Sonne is equipped to cover a wide spectrum of ocean research. An A-frame crane at the stern has a lifting capacity of 30 t. This can be used for deploying submersibles and other heavy equipment. Four cranes with a lifting capacity of 10 t and three small cranes (2 x 2 t and 1 x 0.5 t) allow the transport of research material across the ship. A winch enables deploying devices to the ocean floor to 12,000 m of water depth.

Some of the tasks of the RV Sonne are to conduct seabed surveys (bathymetry) with different high-precision echo-sounding systems and seismic surveys. These systems can be disturbed by air bubbles created near the water surface and/or along the hull and swept down under the arrays. To avoid this, a special hull form was designed and tested in water basins. A dent runs along both sides of the hull to guide water and bubbles behind the echo sounding arrays installed within an integrated gondola near the bow. Furthermore, the outer hull surface was kept as smooth as possible to prevent production of air bubbles through cavitation processes. Further the entire ship is tuned to reduce interference from intrinsic sound and a deployable stabilization system with active fins minimizes unwanted self-motion of the ship.

For troubleshooting during the scientific expeditions, the ship is equipped with several workshops: a deck workshop (for heavy mechanical work), an electronic workshop, a machinery workshop (for fine mechanical work) and an electric workshop.

Up to 25 twenty-foot ISO containers can be stored on board (4 of them inside). There are 550 m^{2} of scientific laboratories.
