= Sun Newspapers =

Suburban Cleveland newspaper chain

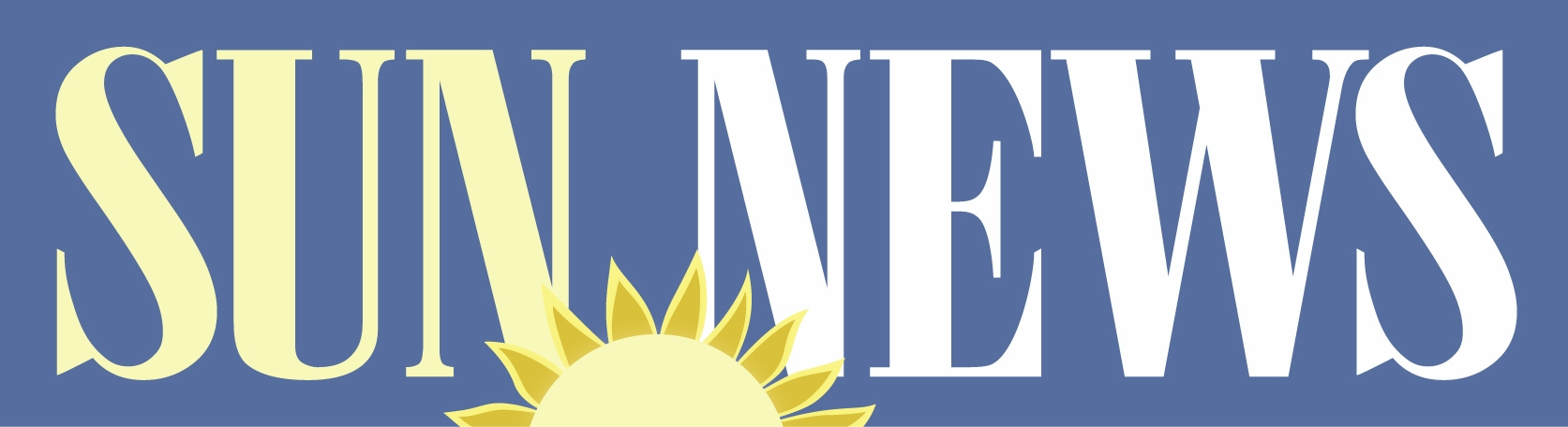

Sun Newspapers was formed as a chain of weekly newspapers serving Northeast Ohio. Prior to a major reorganization in 2013, the chain consisted of 11 weekly newspapers serving 49 different communities in Greater Cleveland. The papers are focused on suburbs and exurbs in Cuyahoga, Geauga, Lorain and Medina counties. Its offices are in Valley View.

Some of the papers in the chain date back, under previous ownership, to the early 20th century, the company was founded as part of SunMedia in 1969. In 1998 it was sold to Advance Publications, part of the S.I. Newhouse media empire, which also publishes The Plain Dealer, the region's major daily.

== Newspapers ==
The 11 papers are divided into four groups. Each group is responsible for two to three different papers, all of which have defined coverage areas.

- Sun Star-Courier: Brecksville, Broadview Heights, Strongsville, and North Royalton.
- Medina Sun: Medina and Medina Township.
- Brunswick Sun Times: Brunswick, Brunswick Hills, and Hinckley Township.
- Sun Post: Brooklyn, Independence, Parma, Parma Heights, and Seven Hills
- News Sun: Berea, Brook Park, and Middleburg Heights.
- Sun Messenger: Gates Mills, Highland Heights, Lyndhurst, Mayfield, Mayfield Heights, Richmond Heights, and South Euclid.
- Sun Press: Beachwood, Cleveland Heights, Shaker Heights, and University Heights.
- Chagrin Solon Sun: Bainbridge Township, Bentleyville, Chagrin Falls, Hunting Valley, Moreland Hills, Pepper Pike, Russell Township, South Russell, Orange, and Solon.
- Sun Post Herald: Fairview Park, Lakewood, North Olmsted Olmsted Falls, Olmsted Township, and the west side of Cleveland.
- Sun Sentinel: Avon, Avon Lake, and North Ridgeville.
- West Shore Sun: Bay Village, Rocky River, and Westlake
