= The Sun (Nigeria) =

Nigerian daily print newspaper

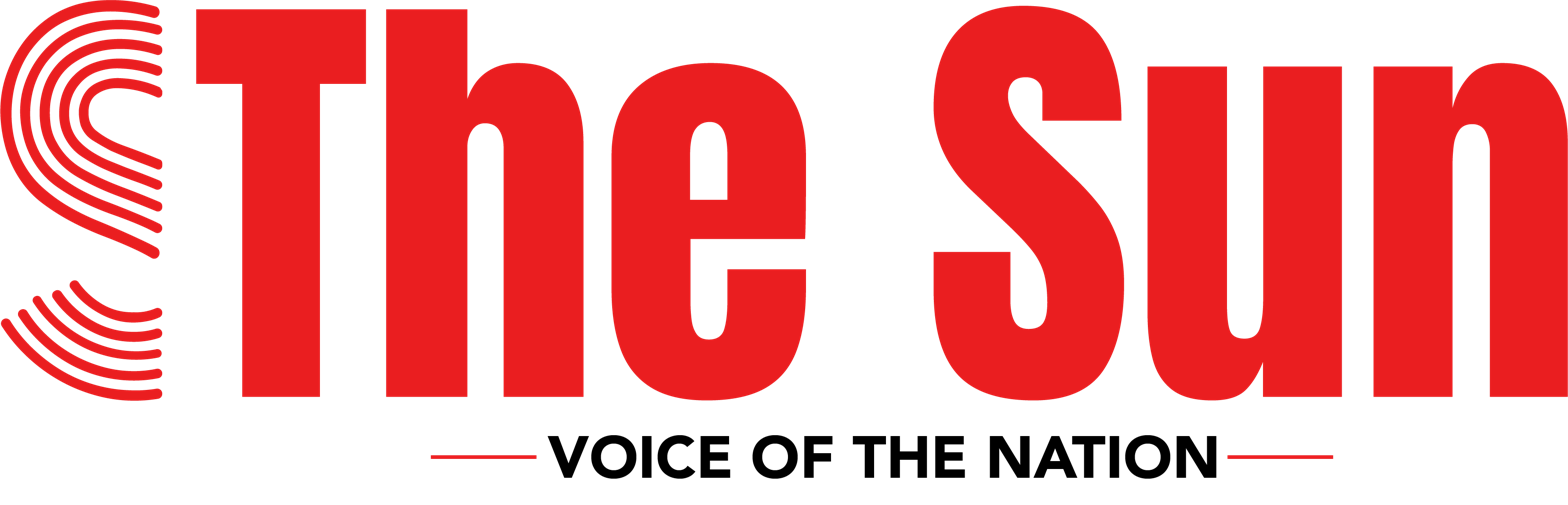
- Type: Daily newspaper
- Format: Broadsheet
- Founder: The Sun Media Group
- Publisher: The Sun Publishing Ltd
- Editor-in-chief: Onuoha Ukeh
- Founded: 2001
- Language: English
- Headquarters: Lagos, Nigeria
- Website: www.thesun.ng

The Sun is a Nigerian daily print newspaper founded and published in KiriKiri Industrial Layout, Lagos, Nigeria. As of 2011, The Sun had a daily print run of 130,000 copies, and 135,000 for weekend titles, with an average of 80% sales. This made The Sun the highest-selling newspaper in Nigeria.

== History ==
Former masthead for The Sun newspaper

The Daily Sun was incorporated on 29 March 2001. It started production as a weekly on 18 January 2003 and as a daily on 16 June 2003. The target audience is young adults in the 18–45 age bracket and in the A, B, and C social-economic classes. The paper is similar in format and logo to a popular newspaper, The Sun, in the United Kingdom, but the two papers are unrelated.

The chairman of the publishing house is Neya Kalu who in May 2022, succeeded her father Dr Orji Uzor Kalu, a former governor of Abia State who currently serves as the Chief Whip of the House of Senate, Federal Republic of Nigeria. The first Managing Director/Editor-in-Chief was Mike Awoyinfa. In January 2010 there was a shake-up in which Tony Onyima succeeded Awoyinfa, and the first Deputy Editor-in-Chief, Dimgba Igwe, was replaced by Femi Adesina. Awoyinfa and Igwe remained as directors on the company's board. Adesina replaced Onyima in December 2013. In June, 2015, Eric Osagie succeeded Adesina as Managing Editor/Editor-in-Chief of The Sun Publishing Limited. On 9 August 2019, Onuoha Ukeh, then Editor Daily, was appointed Managing Director/Editor-in-Chief to replace Osagie.
