= MS Dream (1998) =

Sun-class cruise ship

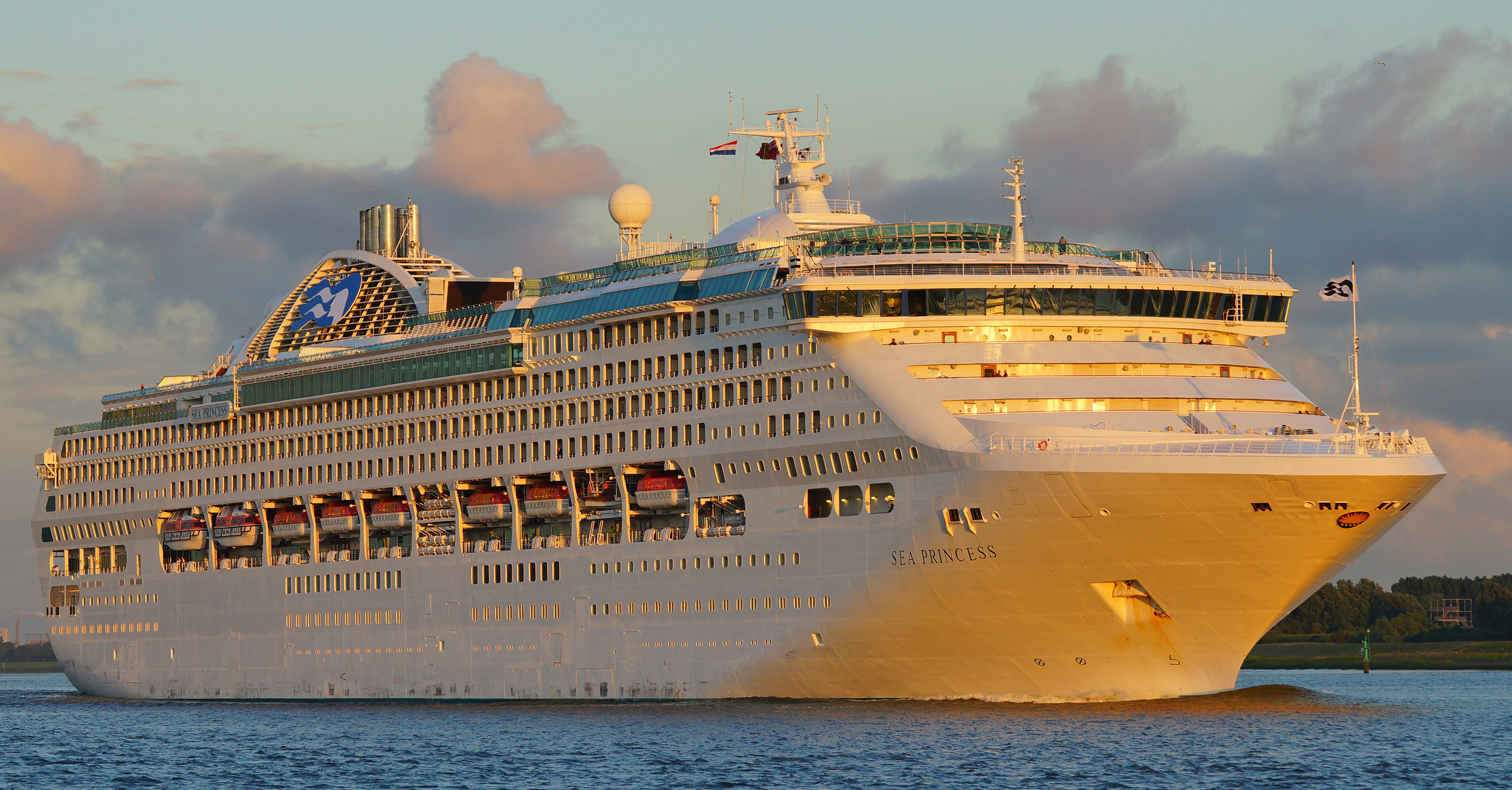
- Sea Princess departs Maassluis, 2016

History
- Name: Sea Princess (1998–2003); Adonia (2003–2005); Sea Princess (2005–2020); Charming (2020–2023); Dream (2023–present)
- Owner: P&O (1998–2000); P&O Princess Cruises (2000–2003); Carnival Corporation & plc (2003–2020); Sanya International Cruise Development (2020–2023); Tianjin Orient International Cruise Line (2023–present)
- Operator: Princess Cruises (1998–2002); P&O Cruises (2002–2005); Princess Cruises (2005–2020); laid up (2020-2023); Cheng Zhen Cruises (2023–present)
- Port of registry: Monrovia, Liberia (1998–2000); United Kingdom, London (2000–2005); Hamilton, Bermuda (2005–2020); Monrovia, Liberia (2020–present)
- Builder: Fincantieri – Cantieri Navali Italiani S.p.A., Monfalcone, Italy
- Yard number: 5998
- Laid down: 1 December 1997
- Launched: 26 January 1998
- Christened: 1998
- Completed: 1998
- Maiden voyage: 1998
- In service: 1998
- Identification: Call sign: ZCBU3; IMO number: 9150913; MMSI number: 310465000
- Status: In service

General characteristics
- Class & type: Sun-class cruise ship
- Tonnage: 77,499 GT; 44,202 NT; 8,293 DWT
- Length: 261 m (856 ft 4 in)
- Beam: 32 m (105 ft 0 in)
- Draught: 8.11 m (26 ft 7 in)
- Decks: 14
- Deck clearance: 9.29 m (30 ft 6 in)
- Installed power: 4 × GMT Sulzer 16ZAV40S (4 × 11,520 kW); 46,080 kW (combined)
- Propulsion: Diesel-electric; two shafts; GEC Alsthom synchronous AC motors (2 × 14,000 kW); Two 6-bladed propellers (⌀ 5.2 m)
- Speed: 22.4 knots (41.5 km/h; 25.8 mph)
- Capacity: 2,000 passengers
- Crew: 900

MS Dream is a cruise ship owned by Tianjin Orient International Cruise Line from 2023. She was built in Italy in 1998 as the Sun-class Sea Princess for Princess Cruises, which operated her until 2020, except for a short period (2003–2005) with P&O Cruises as Adonia. Sold in 2020 and renamed Charming, the ship did not re-enter service until acquired by Tianjin Orient.

== History ==
The vessel was delivered to Princess Cruises from Fincantieri and began operation in 1998 under the name of Sea Princess.

Sea Princess was transferred to P&O Cruises in late 2002/early 2003. P&O renamed her Adonia on 21 May 2003 (not to be confused with a different P&O vessel of a different class which was also given the Adonia name later in 2011). The Princess Royal and her daughter Zara Phillips renamed the vessel to Adonia at a launching ceremony with sister ship Oceana, in the first double ship naming ceremony ever in the UK. Adonia filled the gap left in the P&O Cruises fleet in the period between Arcadia leaving the fleet to become Ocean Village and the launch of the new Arcadia in 2005, when the vessel was transferred back to Princess Cruises.

When Princess Cruises reacquired her in 2005, the vessel was once more named Sea Princess, in a ceremony by Joanna Lumley.

From 2019, Sea Princess was homeported in Australia and was intended to sail from new homeports in Fremantle and Adelaide for the 2020–2021 calendar season. However, in September 2020 Princess Cruises announced that it had sold Sea Princess, and on 13 November 2020 she was delivered to Sanya International Cruise Development and renamed Charming. Due to the COVID-19 pandemic, the ship did not enter service as Charming and remained laid up, though some reconditioning work was undertaken at China Merchants Industry Holding's shipyard at Mazhou Island in 2021.

In January 2023 Charming was sold to Tianjin Orient International Cruise Line and renamed Dream. Homeported at Tianjin, cruises were commenced in September 2023, with destinations including Jeju in South Korea, and Japanese ports.

== Accidents and incidents ==
=== Norovirus outbreaks ===
At the end of May 2006, 250 people, including 18 crew, were affected by a norovirus. Evidence of a gastrointestinal virus had been found during the last two days of the previous cruise, but the company stated that it did not believe the two outbreaks to be linked. The passengers were notified of this occurrence by a letter found in their cabins after boarding. Although the ship's itinerary had been altered, and the vessel ordered to dock away from other vessels, no other countermeasures were effected. Sea Princess returned to port in Southampton a day early, and the vessel underwent a complete sanitisation and decontamination before resuming cruising. Passengers were offered a 30% refund and a £150 voucher for use on a later Princess cruise; some demanded a full refund. A norovirus outbreak occurred again on the following cruise, although to a lesser extent, and visible precautions included waiter service at the buffets and the absence of salt and pepper shakers. This cruise was also affected by force 11-12 winds in the vicinity of Ushant, causing the first scheduled port to be missed, while the remaining itinerary remained unaltered. The ship was undamaged, the nearby Legend of the Seas suffered broken windows, and Pride of Bilbao terminated her Spain-bound voyage in France due to storm damage. It is likely that the rough seas caused increased use of the handrails, contributing to the difficulty of eradicating norovirus.

In January 2018, about 200 passengers were reported to have been infected with norovirus during a two-week round trip from Brisbane to New Zealand.

=== Drug smuggling ===
On 28 August 2016, three Canadian nationals were arrested after Sea Princess berthed in Sydney Harbour. After the ship docked Australian Border Force officers along with drug sniffing dogs boarded the ship. During a search of the ship 95 kg (209 lb) of cocaine was found packed in suitcases. The estimated value of the cocaine is $30 million AUD (US$22 million). The maximum penalty for this offense is life in prison.

== Gallery ==
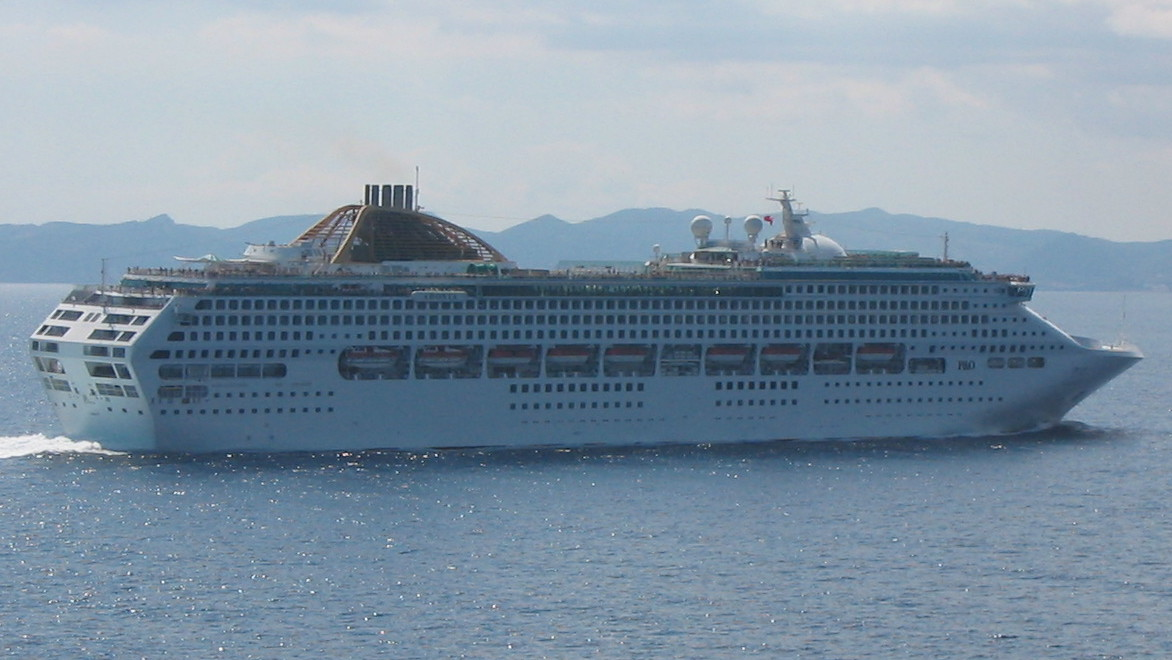
Adonia

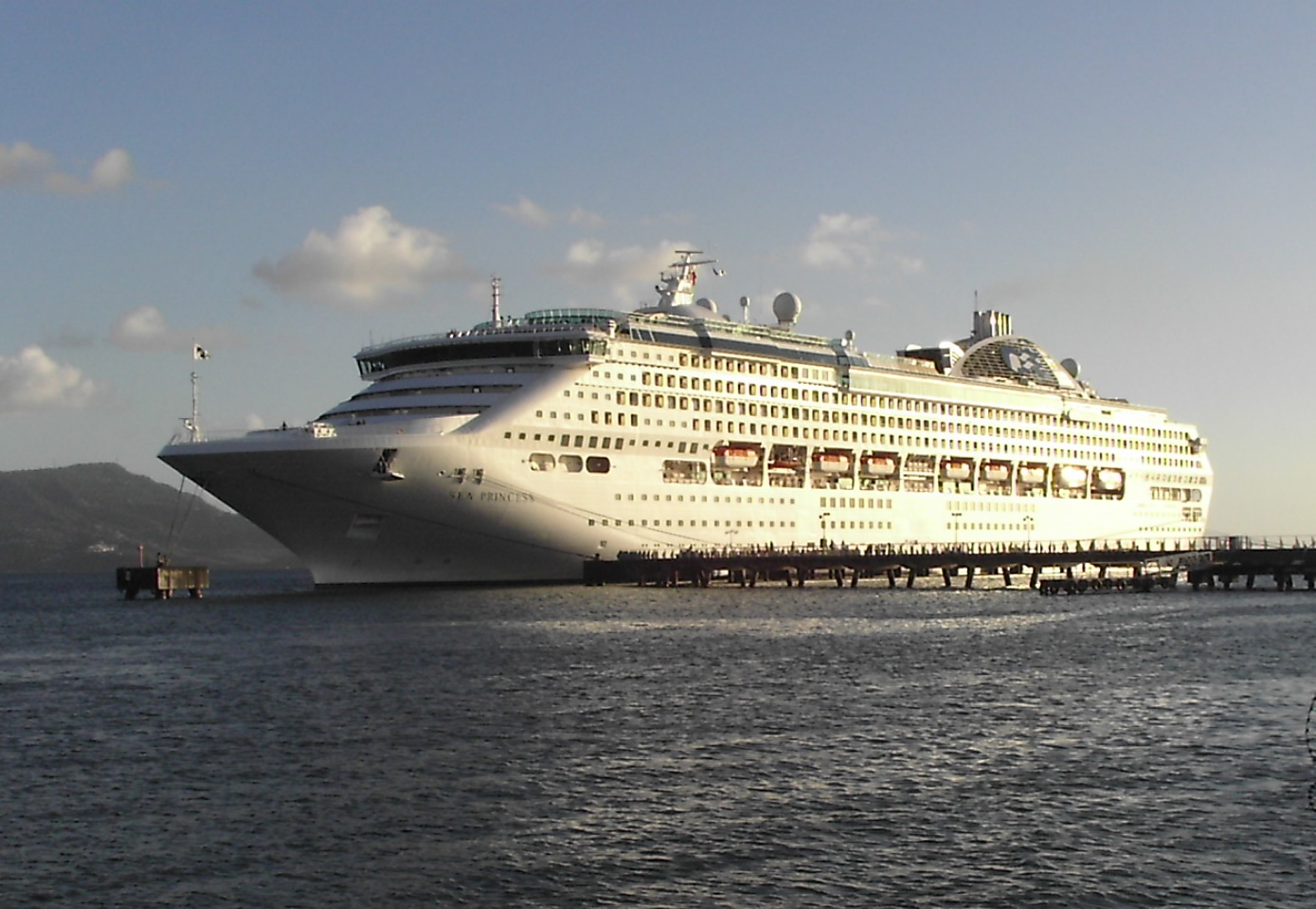
Sea Princess at Fort-de-France, Martinique, 2006.

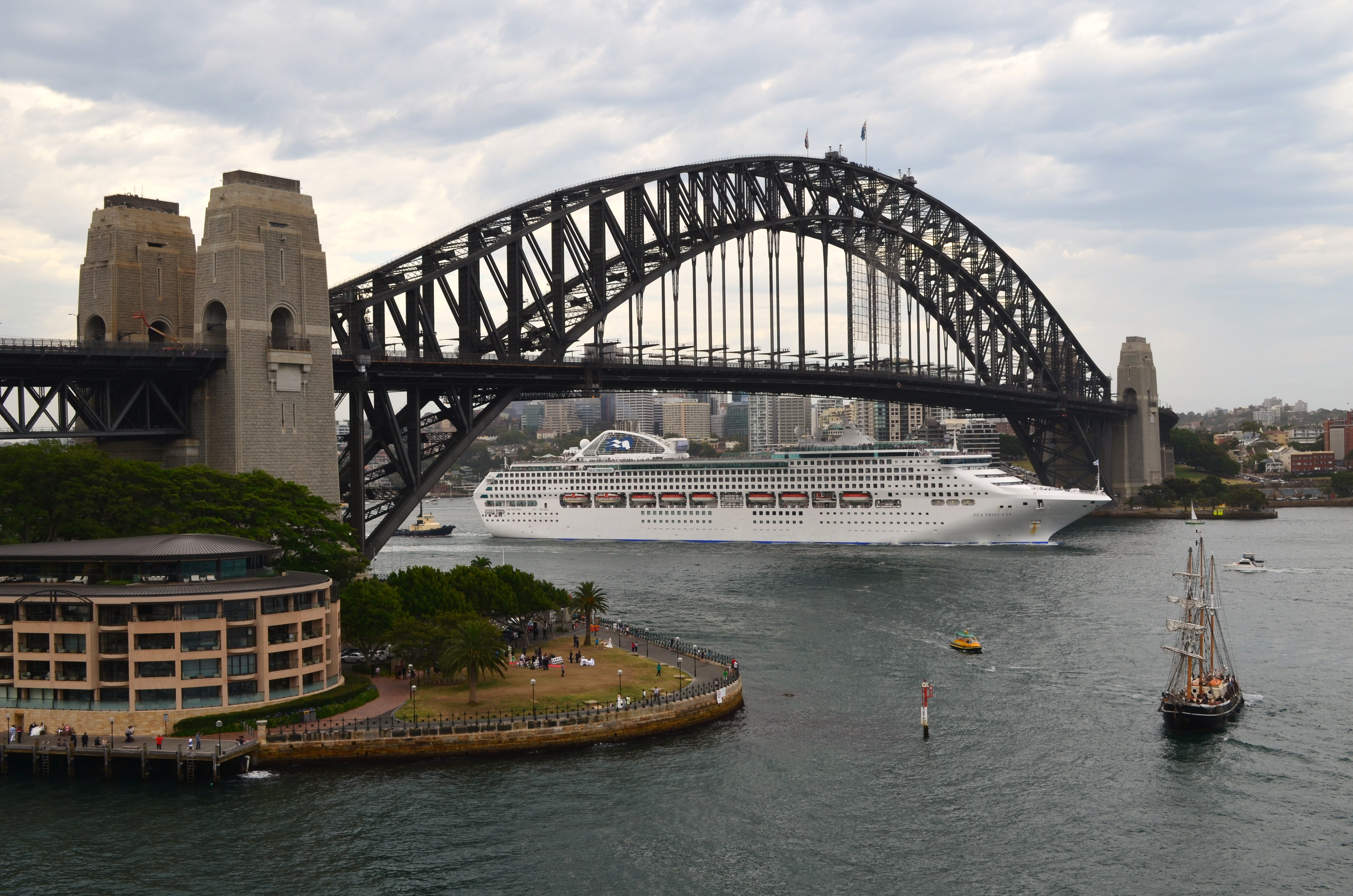
Sea Princess passing underneath the Sydney Harbour Bridge, 2013.

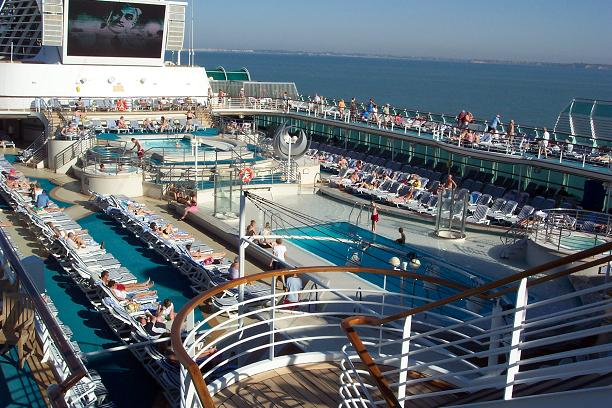
The main deck of Sea Princess during a cruise in the Mediterranean Sea.

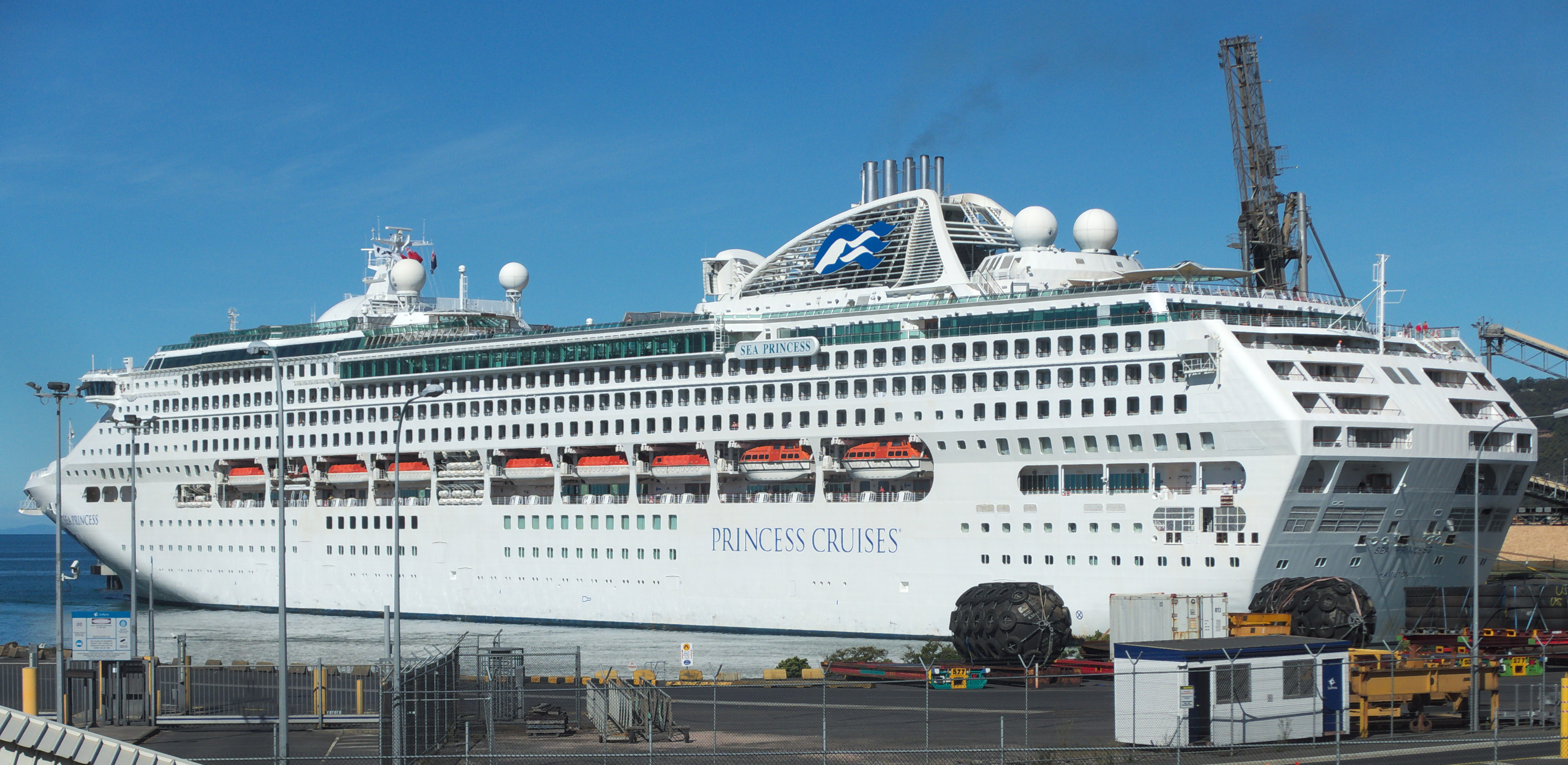
Sea Princess in 2019
