= Atlantic Star (cruise ship) =

Cruise ship built in 1984

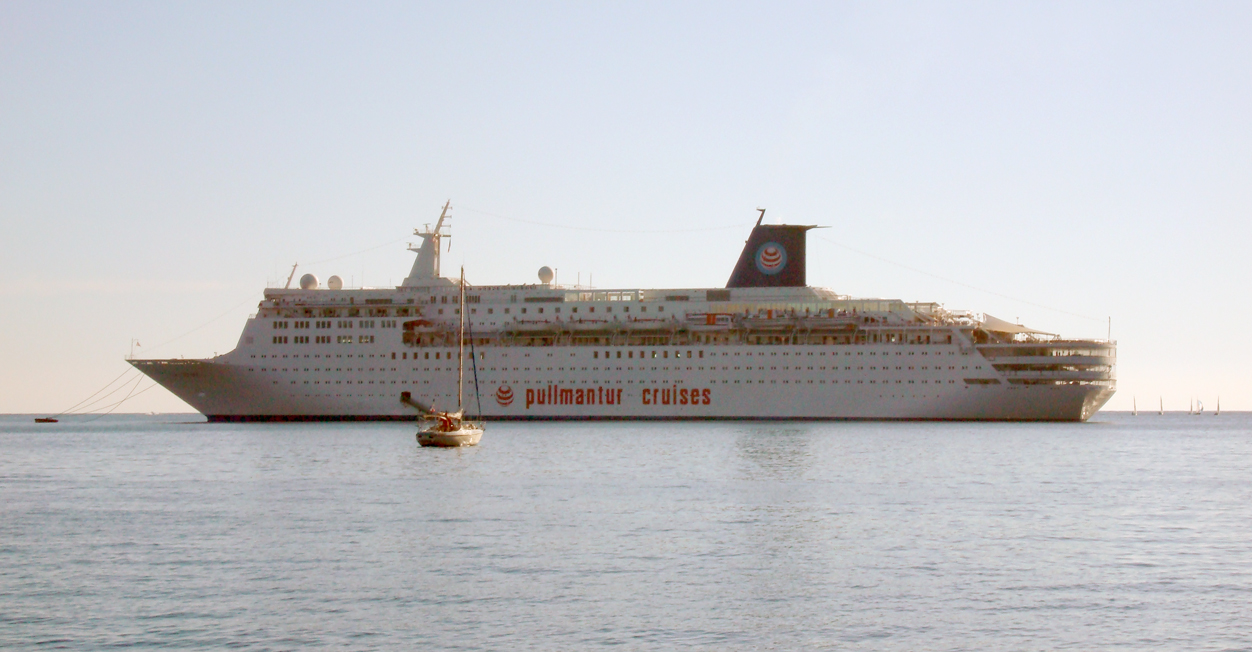
- Sky Wonder at Villefranche, November 2007.

History
- Name: Antic (2013); Atlantic Star: (2009–2013); Sky Wonder: (2006–2009); Pacific Sky: (2000–2006); Sky Princess: (1988–2000); FairSky: (1984–1988)
- Owner: Belinda Shipholding: 2013; Royal Caribbean Cruises Ltd: 2006–2013; Carnival Corporation & plc: 2004–2006; P&O Princess Cruises: 2000–2003; P&O: 1988–2000; Sitmar Cruises: 1984–1988
- Operator: Pullmantur Cruises: 2006–2010; P&O Cruises Australia: 2000–2006; Princess Cruises: 1988–2000; Sitmar Cruises: 1984–1988
- Port of registry: Malta
- Builder: La Seyne-Sur Mer, France
- Laid down: 16 July 1981
- Launched: 6 November 1982
- Christened: March 1984
- Completed: 12 April 1984
- Maiden voyage: 1984
- In service: 1984–2013
- Out of service: 2013
- Identification: IMO number: 8024026
- Fate: Scrapped at Aliağa, Turkey in 2013

General characteristics
- Tonnage: 46,087 GT
- Length: 240 m (790 ft)
- Beam: 29.8 m (97 ft 9 in)
- Draft: 8 m (26 ft)
- Decks: 11
- Installed power: Three steam turbines; 29,500 shp (22,000 kW)
- Speed: 19.8 kn (36.7 km/h) (service); 21.8 kn (40.4 km/h) (maximum)
- Capacity: 1,250 passengers
- Crew: 600

Atlantic Star (formerly FairSky, Sky Princess, Pacific Sky and Sky Wonder) was a cruise ship built in 1984. She sailed for Sitmar Cruises, Princess Cruises, P&O Cruises Australia, and Pullmantur Cruises. Under ownership of Royal Caribbean Cruises Ltd., the ship had been laid up since 2010 before being handed over to STX France in 2013 as a partial payment for the construction of what is now, Harmony of the Seas. She was later sold to a shipbreaker in Aliağa, Turkey, renamed Antic, and scrapped on 14 April 2013.

== History ==
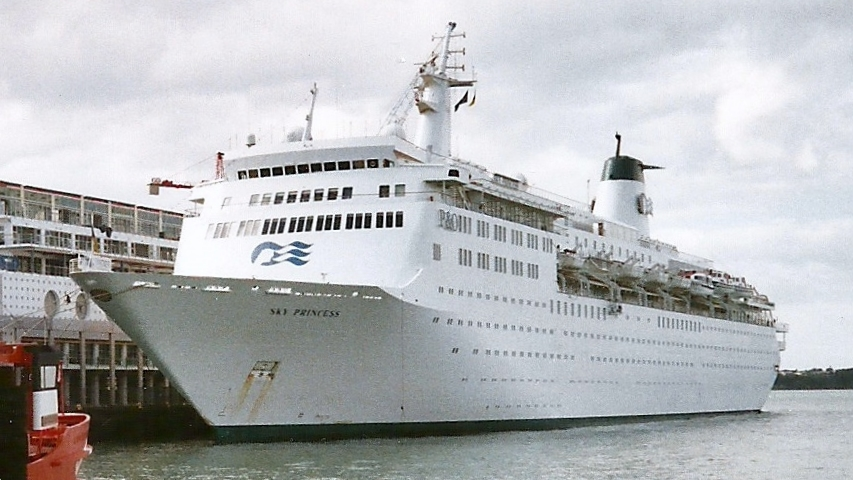
Sky Princess in Auckland, New Zealand in February 2000

FairSky was built in 1984 by Chantiers de Nord et de la Mediterranee of La Seyne-Sur Mer in France for the Italian cruise company, Sitmar Cruises. In keeping up with the rest of the Sitmar fleet, she was originally named FairSky and was registered in Liberia. In September 1988, when Sitmar was purchased by P&O Cruises, she was renamed the Sky Princess for P&O's Princess Cruises subsidiary and re-registered in London.

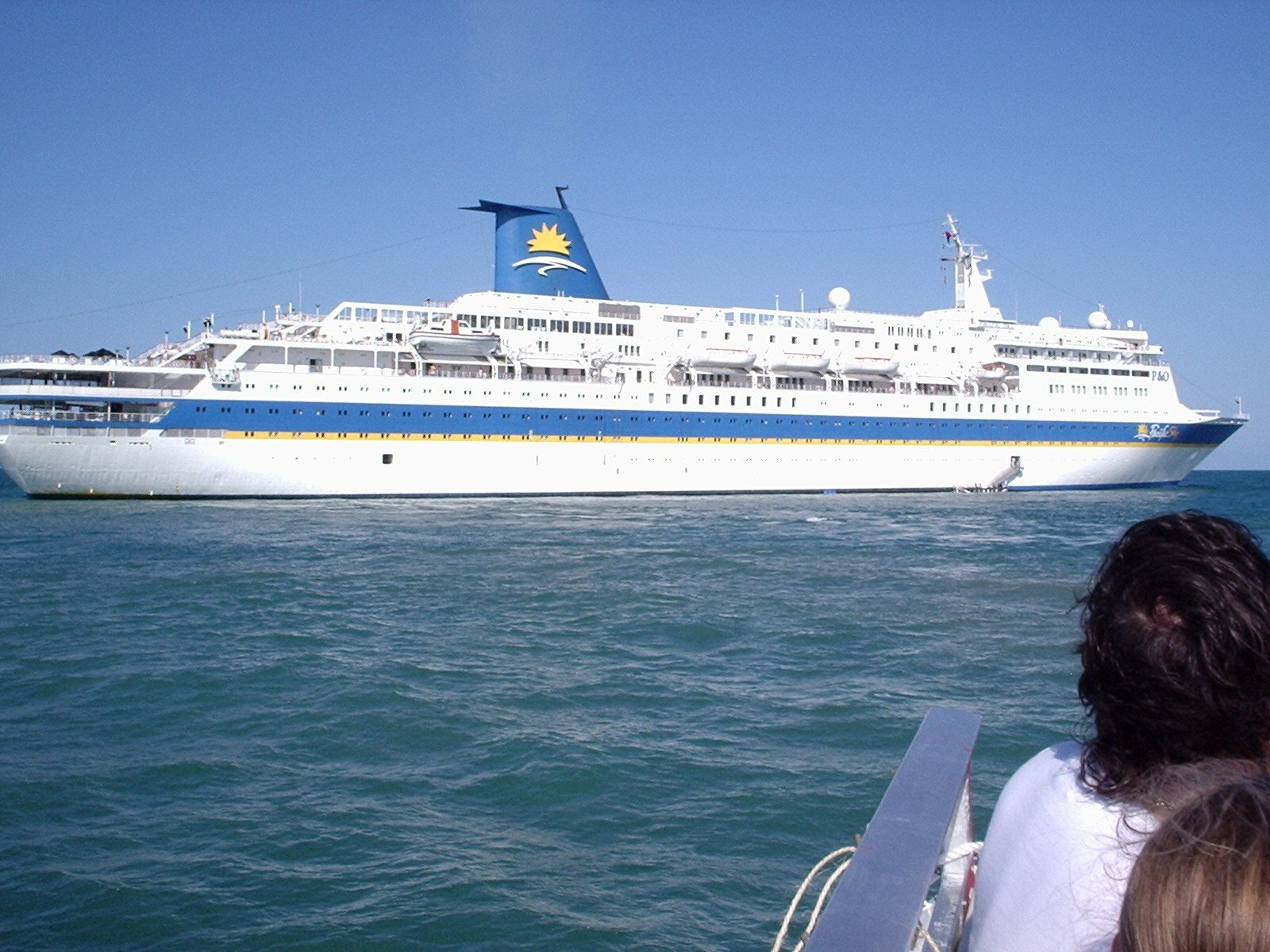
Pacific Sky in Port Douglas, Queensland, Australia

Sky Princess sailed her last cruise for Princess Cruises in October 2000, arriving in Sydney on 23 October, where she was to be transferred to P&O Cruises Australia under the name, Pacific Sky, after a $10 million refurbishment at Cairncross Dockyard in Brisbane. Replacing the 1957-built Fair Princess, Pacific Sky's was quickly accepted by Australian cruise passengers. Between 2000 and 2006, Pacific Sky carried 275,000 passengers on 200 cruises. Her popularity prompted the expansion of the P&O Australia fleet to include Pacific Sun (2004), Pacific Dawn (November 2007), Pacific Jewel (2009) and Pacific Pearl (2010).

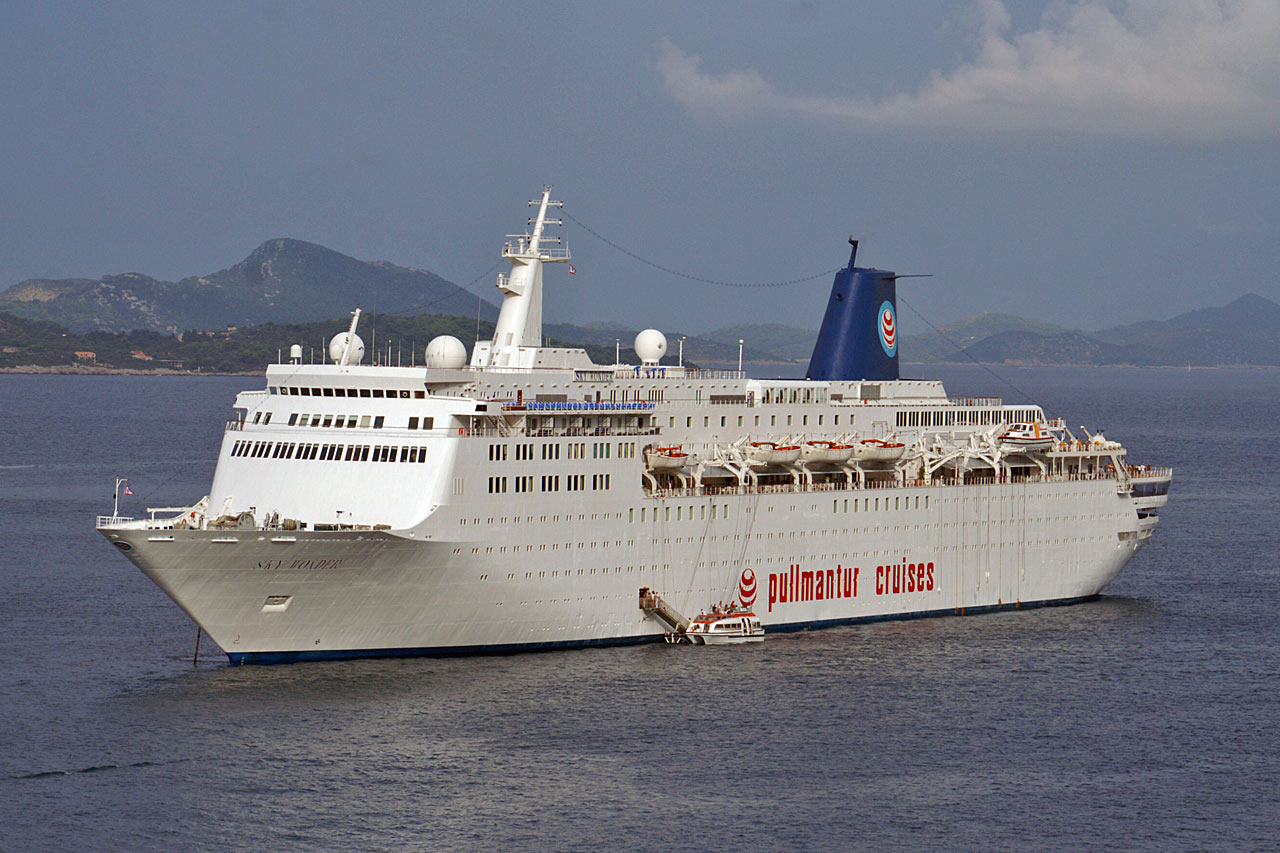
Sky Wonder in Dubrovnik, Croatia

In May 2006, the transfer from P&O Cruises Australia to Pullmantur Cruises in Spain was made, after a series of 33 seven-day cruises based out of Singapore. Sky Wonder was registered in Valletta, Malta. The Italian-built Regal Princess took Sky Wonder's place in the P&O Cruises fleet in mid-2007 as the Pacific Dawn. From March 2009 on, Sky Wonder was laid up in Piraeus. In April 2009, she was renamed Atlantic Star and sailed for the Portuguese market.

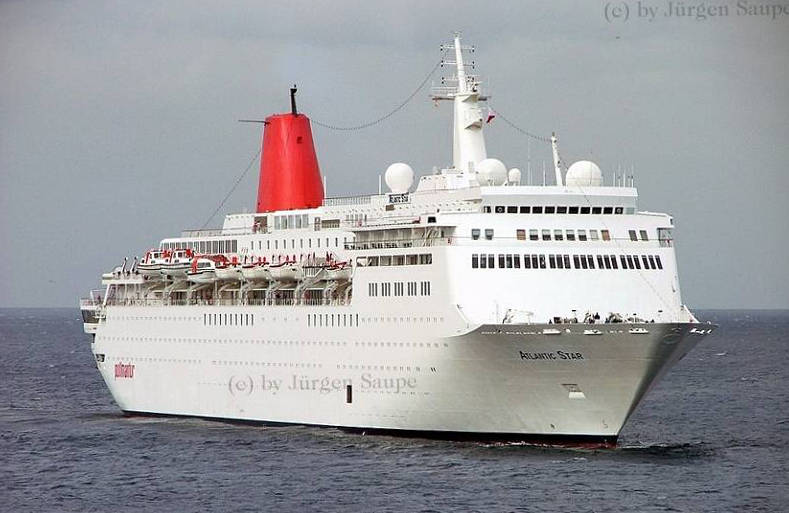
Atlantic Star at sea

In January 2010, Kyma Ship Management expressed interest in purchasing the ship, but they backed out due to the high cost of replacing the steam turbines with diesel engines. It was speculated that she would be operating on charter for a German tour operator as Mona Lisa previously did, but the vessel remained moored in Marseille, France until March 2013.

In January 2013, it was announced that the ship had been transferred to STX France as part of the deal with the new order of the Oasis-class cruise ship ordered by Royal Caribbean International. In March 2013 it was reported that the ship had departed under tow for Suez, Egypt, and on 14 April 2013, Atlantic Star arrived the shipbreaking yard in Aliaga, Turkey, under the name Antic.

== General characteristics ==
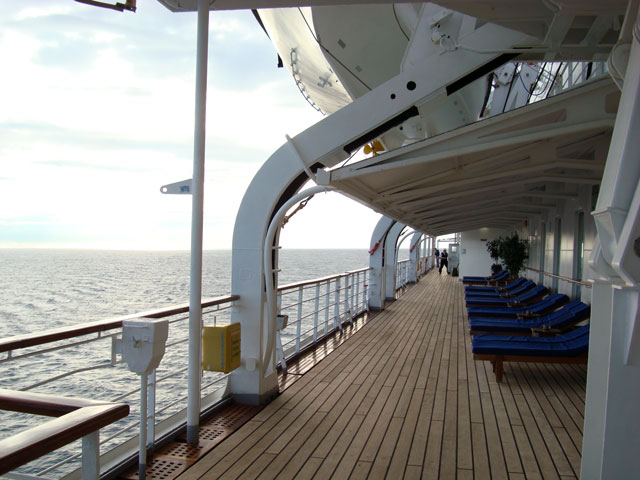
Promenade deck on the Sky Wonder

Atlantic Star was 240.4 m (788 ft 9 in) in length and 29.8 m (97 ft 9 in) in width at her widest point. Her draft was approximately 8.5 m (27 ft 11 in), but this figure varies with respect to the amount of stores, fuel and water on board. The size of a cruise ship is expressed in gross tonnage, which is actually a measurement of the vessel's volume and not the actual weight. Atlantic Star measured 46,087 GT.

Atlantic Star was powered by steam turbines and was one of the last steam turbine cruise ships in the world. While at sea, she operated on two or three boilers depending on the speed required. When two were in use, she could achieve a maximum speed of 19.8 kn (36.7 km/h); when all three boilers were in use, she could steam at a maximum of 21.8 kn (40.4 km/h). At full speed, she would consume up to 220 tonnes of fuel oil a day.

The vessel had two fixed-pitch propellers and a single rudder. She was fitted with one bow thruster and one stern thruster for maneuvering at ports

Atlantic Star was fitted with two retractable stabilizer fins, which could be extended either individually or together depending on the sea conditions. Each fin was 4 m (13 ft) long and 1.5 m (4 ft 11 in) wide. They were controlled by hydraulic rams and were fed information from gyroscopes which sense the vessel's rolling motion. When in use, they could reduce the amount of the vessel's roll by up to 85% but they had no effect on the ship's pitching motion.

Atlantic Star had two anchors. Each anchor weighed nine tonnes and was attached to approximately 80 tonnes of anchor chain.

== Incidents ==
Atlantic Star was involved in many incidents during her career. Some are listed below in chronological order.

- September 2002 – Dianne Brimble, 42, of Brisbane, died after overdosing on the drug GHB. An inquest found that her drink had been spiked while on a 10-day cruise of the Pacific.
- November 2004 – Pacific Sky was due to begin a scheduled cruise off the Australian coast, but could not sail after a swarm of jellyfish blocked a cooling water intake. The engines had automatically shut down, leaving the vessel stuck fast at its Brisbane River berth. The shutdown also triggered the automatic dumping of vast quantities of distilled water used by the ship's boilers, and a fresh supply had to be trucked in.
- 1 April 2005 – P&O Cruises was forced to cancel another two Pacific Sky cruises to allow extended work on the ship's troublesome starboard gearbox. P&O Cruises said the two-month layoff would lead to the cancellation of five cruises but was confident problems would have been fixed in time for a scheduled 4 June cruise.
- 7 March 2006 – Hundreds of passengers on a seven-night cruise were left stranded for about 30 hours after the vessel broke down in the Strait of Malacca near Singapore. About five hours after leaving Singapore, the ship experienced problems with its starboard engine and came to a halt with more than 1,300 passengers on board. The crew tried to fix the problem at sea but were unsuccessful. The ship ultimately sailed slowly to Port Kelang, Malaysia using its working starboard engine.
- 18 January 2007 – Early in the morning, the Sky Wonder with 1,600 passengers ran aground on a sandbar in the Río de la Plata, 3 kilometres from the port of Buenos Aires, Argentina. There were no injuries other than a heart problem suffered by a 50-year-old male passenger, who was treated ashore. The ship was freed by tugboats at high tide several hours later, so she could reach her destination of Punta del Este, Uruguay. She was chartered for CVC Cruises at the time. The grounding was reported to be due to a navigational error by her captain.
