= P&O Princess Cruises =

British shipping company (2000–2003)

P&O Princess Cruises plc
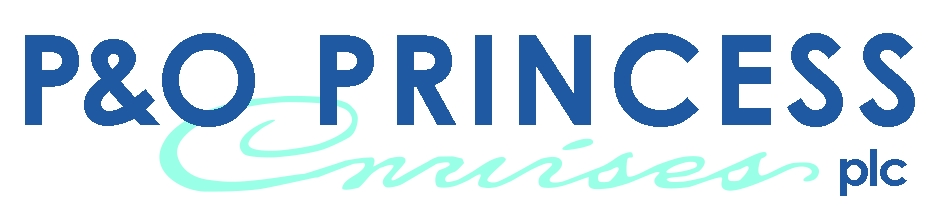
- Type: Public
- Traded as: LSE: POC; NYSE: POC
- Predecessor: P&O
- Founded: 2000
- Defunct: 2003
- Fate: Merged with Carnival Corporation
- Successor: Carnival Corporation & plc
- Headquarters: London, England
- Website: poprincesscruises.com

P&O Princess Cruises plc was a shipping company that existed between 2000 and 2003, operating the P&O Cruises, Princess Cruises, P&O Cruises Australia, A'Rosa Cruises, AIDA Cruises and Ocean Village branded cruise lines. The company was formed from the de-merged passenger services of the P&O and operated until 2003 when it was re-listed as Carnival plc following a merger with Carnival Corporation. Its registered office was in London.

== History ==
P&O Princess Cruises originated from the P&O, founded in England in 1837. In 1844, the company began operating passenger services which were the forerunner of modern cruise holidays, and as such it became recognised as the world's oldest cruise line.

In 1974, P&O acquired Princess Cruises, a North American cruise line founded in 1964 by Stanley McDonald. In 1977, P&O de-merged its passenger services division to form P&O Cruises. In 1988, P&O de-merged P&O Cruises' Australian operations, acquiring Sitmar Cruises, which led to the formation of P&O Cruises Australia.

In 1999, P&O acquired the Germany cruise line, AIDA Cruises. In 2000, P&O de-merged its cruise ship operations, forming a new company, P&O Princess Cruises Limited.<refe=Guardi/> The company was listed on the London Stock Exchange, making it completely independent of the P&O Group. The company operated the P&O Cruises, P&O Cruises Australia, Princess Cruises and AIDA Cruises brands.

In 2001, talks were held with Royal Caribbean and Festival Cruises to discuss a possible merger. Also in 2001, P&O Princess Cruises launched the A'Rosa Cruises brand. In 2003, P&O Princess Cruises merged with Carnival Corporation to form Carnival Corporation & plc. As a result of the merger, P&O Princess Cruises plc was re-listed as Carnival plc, becoming the UK holding company of the Carnival Group. As Carnival plc, the company largely retained the P&O Princess executive team and shareholder body, with executive control of the group's activities in the UK and Australia.

== Head office ==
The P&O Princess head office was in London. After P&O accepted a takeover from Carnival Corporation in 2003, the company planned to close the P&O head office in London. P&O Princess offered the 25 employees there a relocation to the P&O Cruises offices in Southampton or dismissal from the company.

== Ship ownership ==
During its brief existence, P&O Princess Cruises owned a number of cruise ships:

- A'Rosa Blu - A'Rosa Cruises and Princess Cruises (as Crown Princess)
- AIDAcara - AIDA Cruises
- AIDAaura - AIDA Cruises
- AIDAvita - AIDA Cruises
- Aurora - P&O Cruises
- Coral Princess - Princess Cruises
- Dawn Princess - Princess Cruises
- Golden Princess - Princess Cruises
- Grand Princess - Princess Cruises
- Island Princess - Princess Cruises
- Ocean Village - Ocean Village and P&O Cruises (as Arcadia)
- Oceana - P&O Cruises and Princess Cruises (as Ocean Princess)
- Oriana - P&O Cruises
- Pacific Princess - Princess Cruises
- Pacific Sky - P&O Cruises Australia and Princess Cruises (as Sky Princess)
- Regal Princess - Princess Cruises
- Royal Princess - Princess Cruises
- Sea Princess - Princess Cruises and P&O Cruises (as Adonia)
- Star Princess - Princess Cruises
- Sun Princess - Princess Cruises
- Tahitian Princess - Princess Cruises
- Victoria - P&O Cruises

== Today ==
The company formerly known as P&O Princess continues to operate as a constituent of the Carnival Group, with executive control of the group's operations in the United Kingdom and Australia. Based at Carnival House in Southampton, Carnival plc provides executive control of P&O Cruises and Cunard Line with additional responsibility for the UK sales and marketing of Princess Cruises. On May 7th 2026 Carnival Corporation & PLC ceased being a dual listed company and reincorporated in Bermuda as Carnival Corporation Ltd. and therefore ceased trading on LSE.
