= Ocean Village (company) =

British cruise line

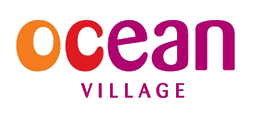
- Company type: Subsidiary
- Industry: Transportation
- Founded: 2003
- Defunct: 2010
- Fate: Brand discontinued
- Headquarters: Southampton, Hampshire, UK
- Products: Cruises
- Parent: Carnival Corporation & plc
- Website: http://www.oceanvillageholidays.co.uk/

Ocean Village was a British-American owned cruise line, based in Southampton, Hampshire, UK. Designed to offer an alternative cruise experience, Ocean Village was founded by P&O Princess Cruises, which later merged with Carnival Corporation to form Carnival Corporation & plc. Ocean Village operated from 2003, until 2010 when the brand was discontinued, with the cruise ship Ocean Village transferring to P&O Cruises Australia.

== History ==
Ocean Village was formed in 2003 as a sister company to P&O Cruises, providing an alternative cruise experience, targeting families and those looking for casual dress codes and fun events as opposed to formal dining. The target audience was 30 to 50 years old and with the cruise concept of freedom and flexibility on board with regard to food, clothing, and entertainment. A secondary target was families, with extensive family facilities. The company's slogan was "the Cruise for people who don't do cruises" and the company extended this policy over both of its ships. It had a fleet of two ships which sail Western and Eastern Mediterranean in the summer and the Caribbean and Mexico in the winter.

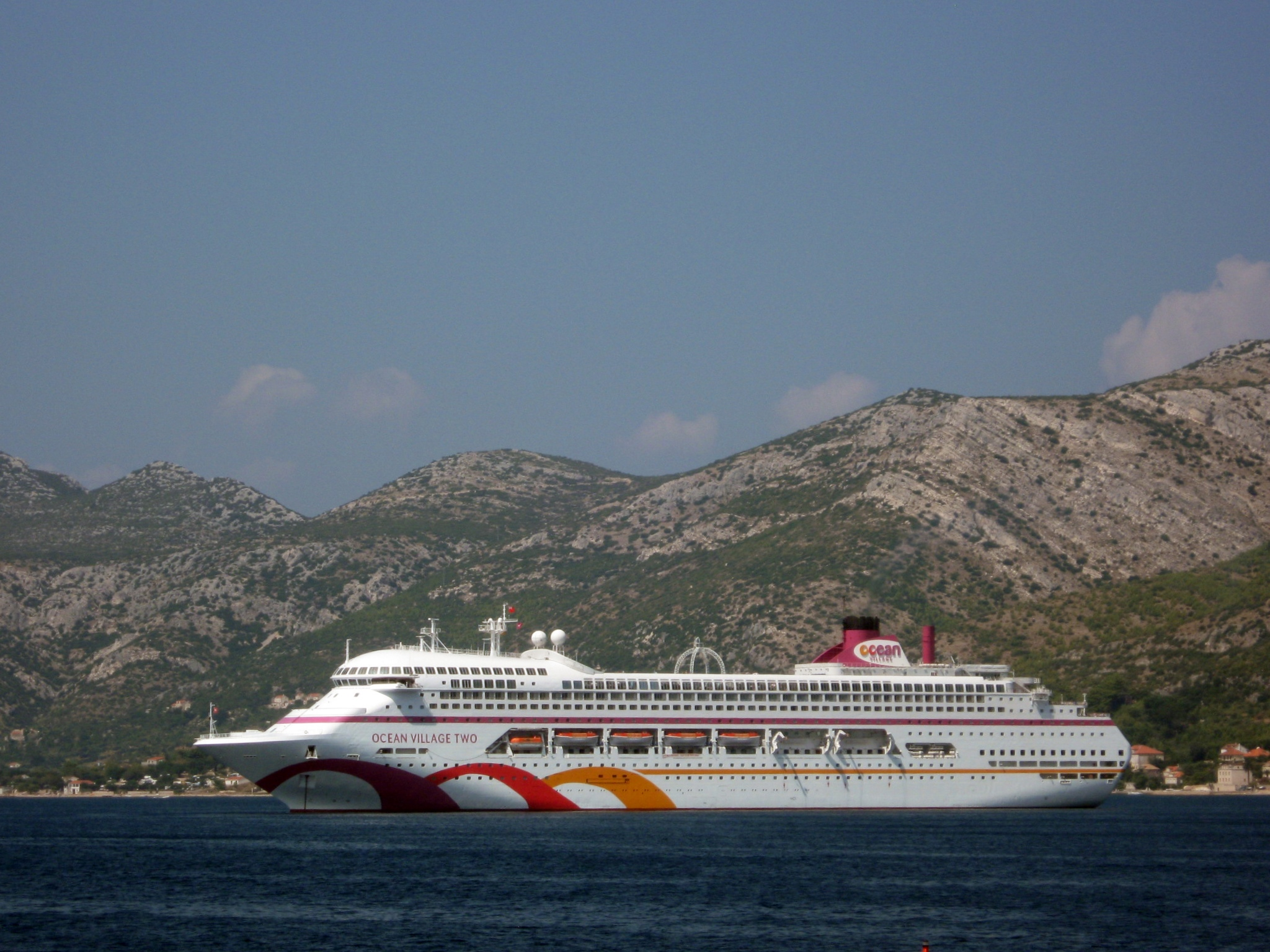
Ocean Village Two in the last year for the company “Ocean Village Cruises” in October 2009

The company's first ship, Ocean Village, was transferred from P&O Cruises in 2003. In 2006, the company was due to take operations of the Regal Princess, but the idea was cancelled in favor of sending her to P&O Cruises Australia. Ocean Village Two was then transferred from AIDA Cruises, Carnival PLC's Germany-based brand with a similar ideology to Ocean Village, in 2007.

On 30 October 2008, it was announced that the Ocean Village brand would cease its operations in late 2010 with both Ocean Village vessels being transferred to P&O Cruises Australia, an area Carnival had forecast as having better growth potential.
This sudden decision took many Ocean Village cruisers customer by surprise, but appears to have come as a result of the global financial meltdown which started mid-September 2008.
Ocean Village Two left the Ocean Village fleet in October 2009, becoming Pacific Jewel, while Ocean Village completed her final cruise in October 2010 and entered drydock for a refit as Pacific Pearl.

== Former fleet ==
Ship	Built	Builder	Entered service for Ocean Village	Gross Tonnage	Flag	Notes	Image
Ocean Village	1989	Chantiers de l'Atlantique	2003–2010	63,500 tons	United Kingdom	Scrapped in Alang in 2021.	
Ocean Village Two	1990	Fincantieri	2007–2009	69,845 tons	United Kingdom	Scrapped in Alang in 2021.	
