= P&O Cruises Australia =

Cruise line based in Australia

- Type: Subsidiary
- Industry: Hospitality
- Founded: 2000
- Defunct: 15 March 2025
- Fate: Absorbed into Carnival Cruise Line
- Successor: Carnival Cruise Line
- Headquarters: Chatswood, New South Wales, Australia
- Area served: Australia & New Zealand
- Key people: Marguerite Fitzgerald (President Carnival Australia)
- Products: Cruises
- Parent: Carnival Corporation & plc
- Website: www.pocruises.com.au
- Footnotes P&O House Flag

P&O Cruises Australia was a British-American owned cruise line with operational headquarters as part of Carnival Australia, based in Chatswood, New South Wales, Australia.

Originally a sister company of P&O Cruises in the United Kingdom, it was previously a constituent of P&O and had a direct link in history to the world's first cruise ships. As such, it was one of the oldest cruise lines in the world, and latterly formed part of the Carnival Corporation & plc, managed locally by Carnival Australia. It operated three ships, sailing from various ports in Australia and New Zealand. In March 2025, P&O Cruises Australia was absorbed into Carnival Cruise Line.

== History ==
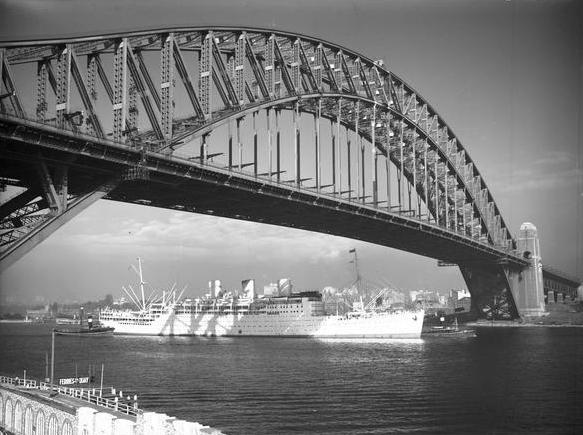
P&O's Strathaird, the first ship to operate an Australian cruise starting in 1932 beneath the Sydney Harbour Bridge

=== Beginnings: P&O in Australia ===
P&O Cruises Australia originated from the passenger division of the P&O, a UK shipping company which operated the world's first passenger ships in the early 19th century. P&O subsequently became the first company to operate passenger routes to Australia. The first of these cruises was operated by Strathaird which sailed on 23 December 1932, carrying 1,100 passengers on a seven-day itinerary calling at Brisbane and Norfolk Island. The cruise sold out in just one day. Over the next 90 years, these passenger voyages evolved into cruise holidays that led to P&O adopting the brand name of P&O Cruises, with the Australian service eventually becoming P&O Cruises Australia.

=== 1989–2000: P&O Holidays ===
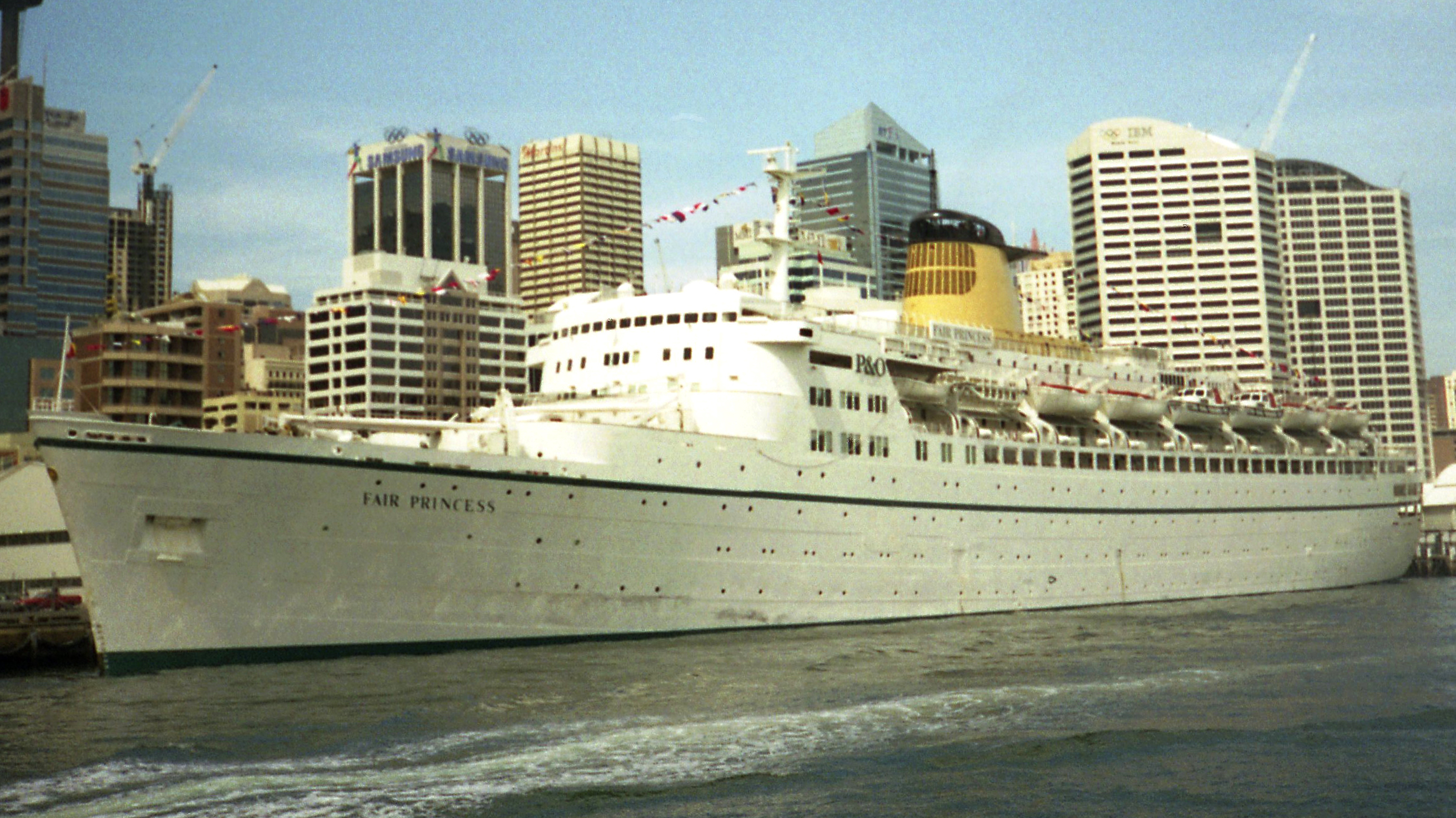
P&O Holidays Australia Fair Princess in Darling Harbour in March 1989

In the 1980s, P&O sustained its operations in Australia with the help of the Oriana, which was transferred to the Australian market in the 1980s. In 1988, P&O Group purchased Sitmar Cruises in 1988, after which it branded Fairstar under the P&O Holidays Australia banner. This was the company's first ship to be permanently based in Australia. She was part of the fleet for nine years until 1997. In 1997, Fairstar was replaced by Fair Princess, which was transferred from sister brand Princess Cruises and sailed for P&O until 2001.

=== 2000: P&O Cruises Australia ===
In 2000, after various changes in the organisation of the P&O Group, the company de-merged all of its cruise ship operations. As a result, the Australian operations of P&O Cruises were split off into a separate cruise line, P&O Cruises Australia. A new company, P&O Princess Cruises, was formed, which was independent of P&O and consisted of P&O Cruises, P&O Cruises Australia, Princess Cruises, AIDA Cruises, and later, A'Rosa Cruises and Ocean Village.

=== 2003–2025: Carnival Corporation & plc ===
In April 2003, P&O Princess Cruises merged with Carnival Corporation to form Carnival Corporation & plc, the world's largest cruise company, with a portfolio of eleven cruise lines at the time, including P&O Cruises Australia.

In October 2009, P&O offered assistance to the Red Cross in relief efforts for earthquake and tsunami victims in the South Pacific by donating 740 pillows with the promise of mattresses, more pillows and hundreds of light bulbs to be given a later date.

In January 2020, Carnival Foundation, the Micky and Madeleine Arison Family Foundation, and five Carnival Corporation & plc cruise line brands – P&O Cruises Australia, Carnival Cruise Line, Cunard, Holland America Line, and Princess Cruises – collectively pledged over US$1.25 million to support disaster recovery efforts from the bushfires that caused widespread devastation throughout Australia. Later, during the COVID-19 pandemic, P&O became embroiled in a controversy with the New South Wales Police Force after the NSW Police Force ordered Pacific Explorer to leave Australian waters on 2 April 2020, a move that P&O president Sture Myrmell claimed was an unprecedented action taken against the cruise line after noting that the ship never harbored any coronavirus cases and that P&O had regularly contributed greatly to the Australian economy. The edict had ordered a total of six cruise ships off the coast of New South Wales to leave Australian waters and was additionally enforced by the Australian Defence Force to supervise logistics and compliance. The order came after NSW Police Commissioner Mick Fuller accused the remaining vessels of delaying their departure and feared any new outbreaks on the vessels would overwhelm NSW's health system.

In September 2021, Carnival Australia announced Marguerite Fitzgerald would take over Stuart Myrmell as president of Carnival Australia and P&O Australia.

During 2023 P&O Cruises celebrated 90 years of local Australian cruising. The brand worked with Australian Maritime Historians Robert Henderson, Rachelle Cross and Chris Frame to develop a historical display that was showcased on board all three ships of the fleet, in Brisbane, Sydney and Fremantle.

In June 2024, it was announced P&O Cruises Australia would be closed and absorbed into Carnival Cruise Line from March 2025 and onward in order to further boost Carnival's capacity. Pacific Adventure and Pacific Encounter were rebranded as Carnival ships, while Pacific Explorer departed the company's fleet in February 2025. P&O's Australian operations, which had been running for over for 90 years finally ceased in March 2025.

== Fleet timeline ==
Since its inception, P&O Cruises Australia has not received any newbuild vessels but has used ships transferred from other companies.

=== Fleet modernisation ===
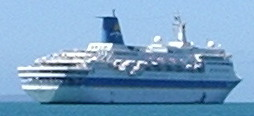
Pacific Sky docked in Port Douglas on 21 May 2007

In 2001, Princess Cruises' Sky Princess was redeployed to Australia to become Pacific Sky, the first modern ship in the fleet. In 2004, Pacific Sun joined the fleet, and was quickly followed by Pacific Star in 2005. In October 2007, the oldest ship of Princess Cruises' fleet, Regal Princess, was transferred to P&O, and after one month of refurbishment, entered service as Pacific Dawn.

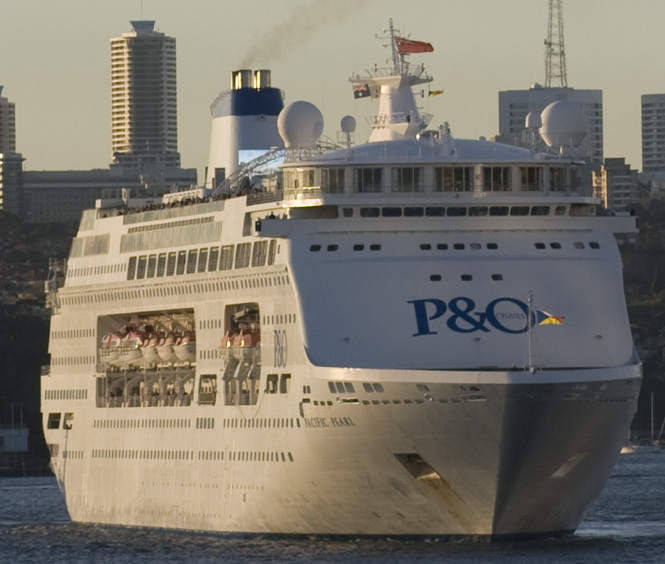
Pacific Pearl in Darling Harbour, Sydney on 1 July 2012

On 30 October 2008, Carnival Corporation announced the closure of their United Kingdom-based Ocean Village brand. Coinciding with this closure, both Ocean Village ships were transferred to the fleet of P&O. Ocean Village Two joined the fleet in December 2009 as Pacific Jewel. Ocean Village followed in late 2010 as Pacific Pearl. With this development, P&O Australia doubled its fleet to four ships, the biggest investment made by a company operating within the Australian cruise industry thus far.

In May 2014, Carnival Corporation announced that its brand, Holland America Line, would transfer Statendam and Ryndam into the P&O Australia fleet in 2015 after being refurbished and tailored for Australian and New Zealand passengers. The names for the two ships were revealed in July 2014 as Pacific Eden and Pacific Aria.

In March 2015, Carnival Corporation and Fincantieri made an agreement for five ships to be delivered between 2019 and 2022. On 30 December 2015, Carnival Corporation established that, from the agreement, the planned 4,200-passenger ship ordered would be delivered to P&O Australia, making her the first newbuild for P&O and the largest ship to be operated by an Australian cruise company. But on 15 December 2016, Carnival Corporation announced that US. brand, Carnival Cruise Line, would receive a third Vista class vessel, meaning the original order for P&O Australia was transferred over to Carnival Cruise Line. Instead, Carnival Splendor was scheduled to be transferred to P&O in late 2019 to compensate for the lost order. However, in September 2017, with the news announced of Golden Princess moving to P&O Australia, Carnival Splendor was no longer scheduled to move to the Australian brand.

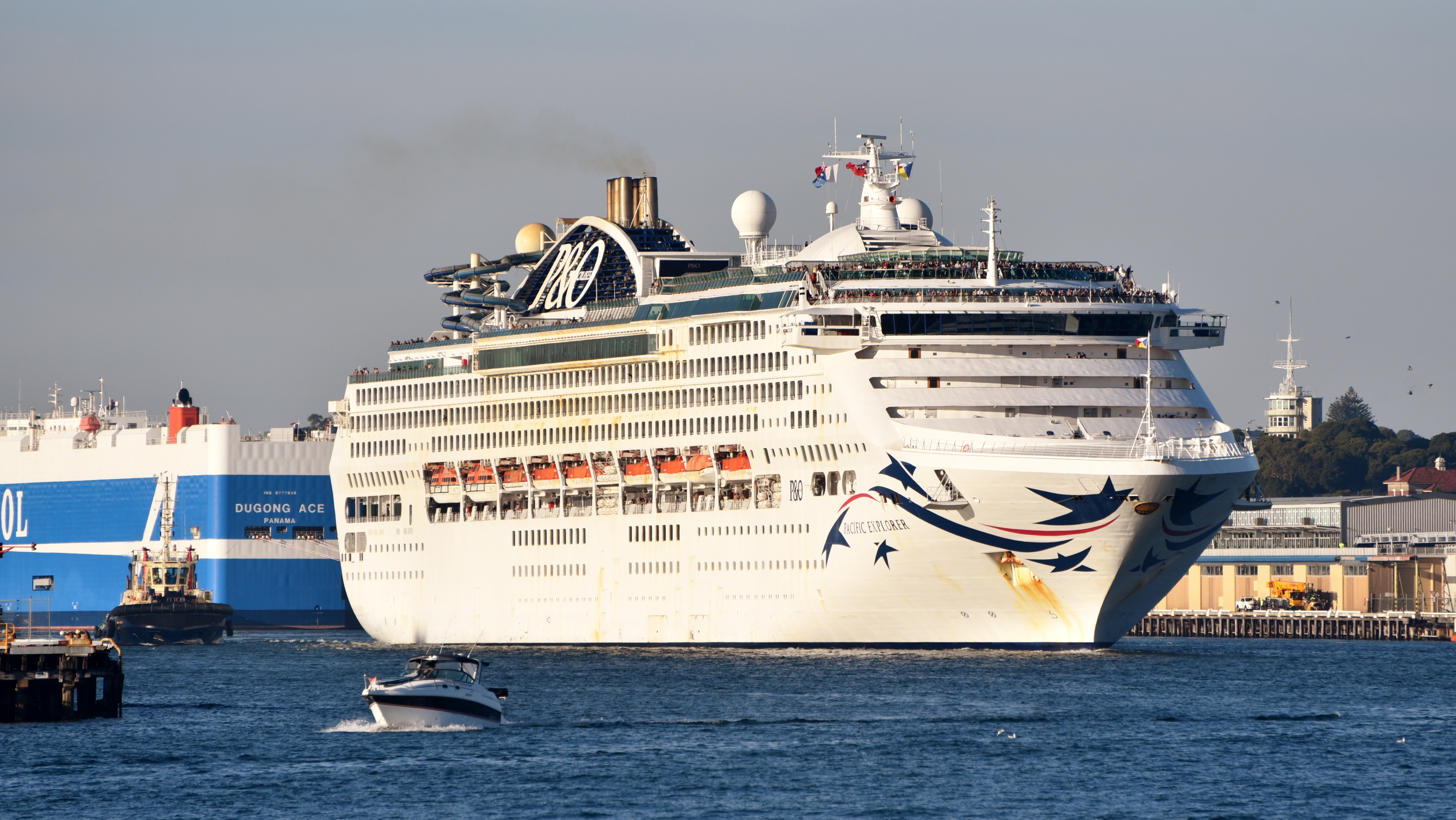
Pacific Explorer in new P&O Australia livery in Fremantle Harbour in April 2023

In October 2015, it was announced that the Dawn Princess would transfer from the Princess Cruises fleet to the P&O Australia fleet. She was renamed Pacific Explorer upon her debut in June 2017.

In September 2018, Golden Princess' new name was announced as Pacific Adventure, a name chosen by six P&O Cruises Australia fans on its Facebook page. She will also have an increase in passenger capacity by 500 to 3,100. Pacific Adventure is scheduled to debut in October 2020 and be homeported in Sydney.

In August 2018, it was announced that Princess was scheduled to transfer a second Grand-class vessel, Star Princess, into the P&O fleet in late-2021 to replace Pacific Jewel which departed the fleet in March 2019. Following the exits of Pacific Dawn and Pacific Aria and the debuts of Pacific Adventure and Pacific Encounter, P&O's fleet of three ships will total a guest capacity of approximately 9,000 guests. On 25 November 2019, it was revealed that Star Princess would be renamed Pacific Encounter upon beginning operations for P&O.

=== Fleet departures ===
In 2006, Pacific Sky was sold to Pullmantur Cruises and renamed Sky Wonder. On 30 May 2007, Pacific Star was also sold to Pullmantur Cruises. She underwent refurbishment in Singapore and began sailing as Ocean Dream from 11 May 2008.

In December 2011, P&O announced Pacific Sun would make her last journey for the company on 1 July 2012 and leave the fleet shortly thereafter. She was sold to HNA Group's HNA Cruises to become Henna and began operating under her new name on 26 January 2013.

In March 2016, P&O announced that Pacific Pearl would leave the fleet in March 2017. She joined Cruise & Maritime Voyages (CMV) and was renamed Columbus, debuting on 9 June 2017.

In March 2018, P&O announced Pacific Eden would leave the fleet in April 2019. She joined CMV and was renamed Vasco da Gama, debuting on 22 April 2019.

On 22 August 2018, P&O announced Pacific Jewel would leave the fleet in March 2019 after ten years with the cruise line, with her final voyage on 24 February 2019. She was sold to Jalesh Cruises and renamed Karnika in April 2019.

On 25 November 2019, P&O announced the exits of Pacific Dawn and Pacific Aria for March 2021 and May 2021, respectively. On 28 November 2019, CMV announced that it had purchased both Pacific Dawn and Pacific Aria, with Pacific Dawn scheduled to enter the fleet as Amy Johnson on 2 March 2021 for the UK market, and Pacific Aria scheduled to enter the fleet of CMV subsidiary Transocean Tours as Ida Pfeiffer on 2 May 2021, for the German market. However, Cruise & Maritime Voyages entered administration in July 2020, as a result the transfers did not go ahead.

On 17 February 2025, Pacific Explorer completed her final cruise for the brand, a one way cruise from Fremantle, Australia to Singapore. The final cruise of Pacific Encounter, scheduled to leave on 8 March 2025, was cancelled due to the effects of Tropical Cyclone Alfred on the port of Brisbane, extending the duration of its previous and now final cruise to Airlie Beach, which departed Brisbane on 4 March. Pacific Adventure departed on its final cruise on 10 March 2025, to fireworks and a water salute in Sydney Harbour. Although initially intended to visit Moreton Island, she sailed to Eden instead due to the effects of Tropical Cyclone Alfred.

== Fleet ==
=== Former fleet ===
Ship	Built	Builder	In service for P&O Australia	Gross tonnage	Flag	Notes	Image
Fairstar	1955	Fairfield Shipbuilding & Engineering Company, Govan	1989–1997	21,619	United Kingdom	Built as the Oxfordshire for the Bibby Line, in cooperation The Ministry of Transport who had contracts with several shipping lines to transport officers, troops and their families.	
Fair Princess	1955	John Brown & Company, Clydebank, Scotland	1997–2000	21,946	Monrovia	Built for Cunard as RMS Carinthia, previously sailing as the Fair Princess for Princess Cruises	
Pacific Sky	1984	La Seyne-Sur Mer	2000–2006	46,087	United Kingdom	Previously Sitmar Cruises FairSky, Princess Cruises Sky Princess. And afterwards became the Sky Wonder and later renamed the Atlantic Star for Pullmantur Cruises. Scrapped in 2013 with the shortened name Antic.	
Pacific Sun	1986	Kockums Varv	2004–2012	47,262	Malta	Previously Carnival Cruise Lines Jubilee. Afterwards it became the Henna for HNA Tourism Cruise. Scrapped in 2017 under the shortened name Hen.	
Pacific Star	1982	Aalborg Shipyard	2005–2008	35,109	United Kingdom	Previously Carnival Cruise Lines Tropicale, Costa Cruises Costa Tropicale. It later sailed as the Ocean Dream for Pullmantur Cruises and later Peace Boat until 2020. Scrapped at Alang Ship Breaking Yard in 2021.	
Pacific Dawn	1991	Fincantieri	2007–2020	70,285	United Kingdom	Previously Princess Cruises Regal Princess. Sold to CMV in 2019. Originally planned to leave the fleet in March 2021 and be moved to Cruise & Maritime Voyages. It was retired early and not taken up by Cruise & Maritime Voyages due to their bankruptcy caused by the COVID-19 pandemic. It was later sold to become the Satoshi and is presently called the Ambience for Ambassador Cruise Line.	
Pacific Jewel	1990	Fincantieri	2009–2019	69,845	United Kingdom	Previously Princess Cruises Crown Princess, A'Rosa Cruises A'Rosa Blu, AIDA Cruises AIDAblu, Ocean Village's Ocean Village Two. It later became the Karnika for Jalesh Cruises. It was sold for scrap in 2020 following the cruise line's bankruptcy due to the COVID-19 pandemic.	
Pacific Pearl	1989	Chantiers de l'Atlantique	2010–2017	63,500	United Kingdom	Previously Princess Cruises Star Princess, P&O Arcadia, and Ocean Village's Ocean Village. Last sailed for Cruise & Maritime Voyages as Columbus. Sold to Seajets following the cruise line's bankruptcy caused by the COVID-19 pandemic. It was later sold for scrap in 2021.	
Pacific Eden	1992	Fincantieri	2015–2019	55,819	United Kingdom	Previously Holland America's Statendam. Sold to Cruise & Maritime Voyages as Vasco da Gama.. Later sold in 2020 to an investment firm following the bankruptcy of the cruise line due to the COVID-19 pandemic.	
Pacific Aria	1994	Fincantieri	2015–2020	55,451	United Kingdom	Previously Holland America's Ryndam. Originally planned to leave the fleet to operate for Cruise & Maritime Voyages in May 2021. It was retired early and not taken up by Cruise & Maritime Voyages due to their bankruptcy caused by the COVID-19 pandemic. It was sold to SeaJets in 2020 and is currently the Aegean Goddess.	
Pacific Explorer	1997	Fincantieri	2017–2025	77,499	United Kingdom	Former Flagship. Previously Dawn Princess. Retired in February 2025	
Pacific Adventure	2001	Fincantieri	2022–2025	108,865	United Kingdom	Formerly sailed as Golden Princess for Princess Cruises. Transferred to P&O Cruises Australia in October 2020. It was transferred to Carnival Cruise Line in March 2025.	
Pacific Encounter	2002	Fincantieri	2022–2025	108,977	United Kingdom	Formerly sailed as Star Princess for Princess Cruises. Transferred to P&O Cruises Australia in October 2020; It was transferred to Carnival Cruise Line in March 2025	

=== Planned fleet ===
Ships that were intended for P&O Australia but never entered service for line:

Ship	Built	Builder	Status	Gross tonnage	Notes	Image
Pacific Splendor	2008	Fincantieri	Never entered service	113,323	Intended to be transferred to P&O Cruises Australia after the transfer of the new-build Vista-class ship (Later named Carnival Panorama) to Carnival Cruise Line. later became Carnival Splendor for Carnival Cruise Line. This transfer was cancelled and instead Golden Princess was transferred as Pacific Adventure.	
Pacific Panorama	2019	Fincantieri	Never entered service	133,868	Planned to be built for P&O Cruises Australia as their first purpose-built ship, but was transferred during construction to Carnival Cruise Line as Carnival Panorama.	
