= MS Ambience =

Cruise ship

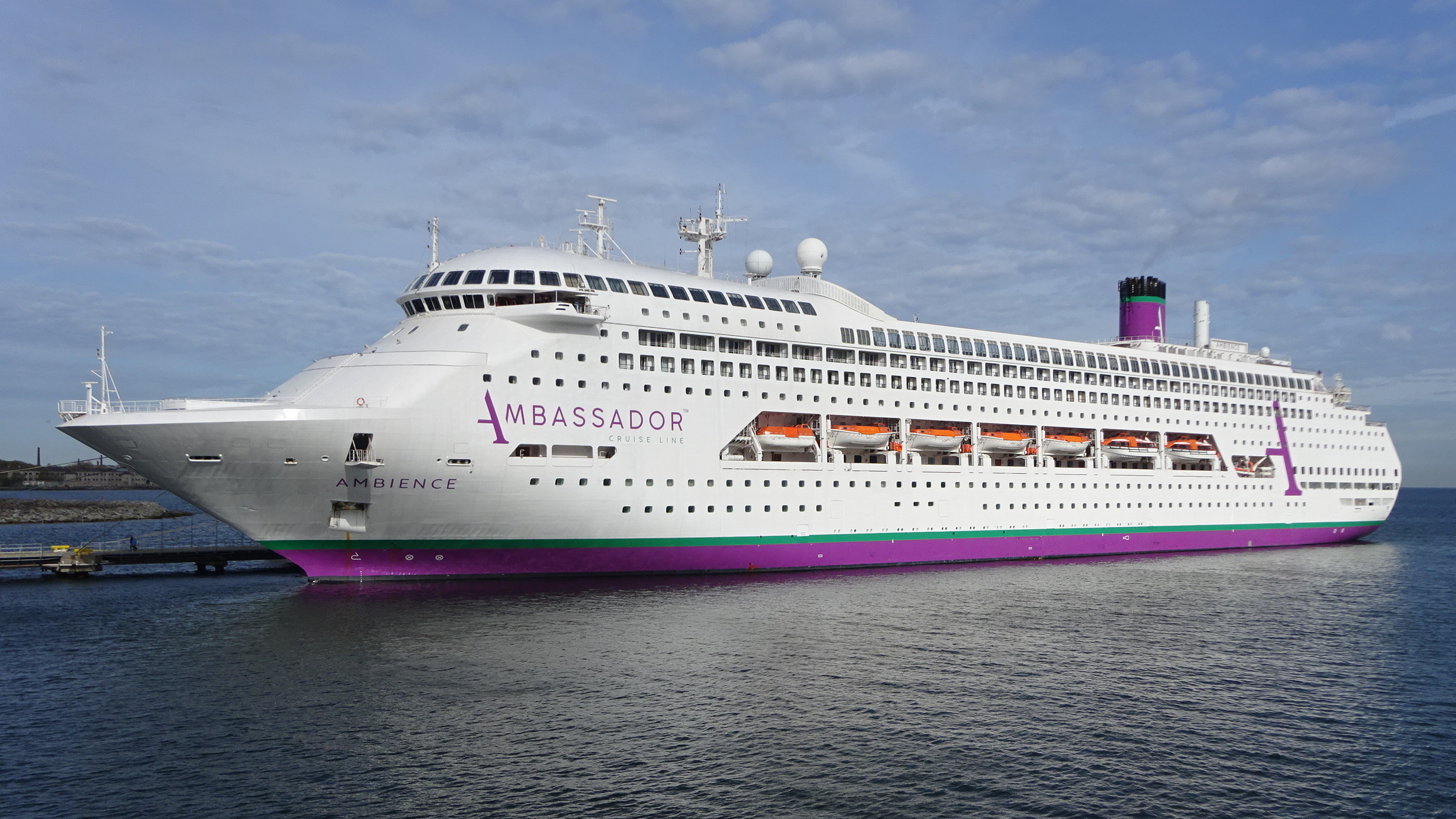
- Ambience moored at Tallinn on May 19, 2022

History

Bahamas
- Name: Regal Princess (1991–2007); Pacific Dawn (2007–2020); Amy Johnson (plan abandoned); Satoshi (2020–2022); Ambience (2022–present)
- Owner: Princess Cruises (1992–2003); Carnival Corporation (2003–2020); Cruise & Maritime Voyages (plan abandoned); Ocean Builders (2020–2021); Wake Asset Co (2021); Ambassador Cruise Line (2021–present)
- Operator: Princess Cruises (1991–2007); P&O Cruises Australia (2007–2020); Cruise & Maritime Voyages (plan abandoned); Ocean Builders (2020–2021); Ambassador Cruise Line (2022–Present)
- Port of registry: Italy, Palermo (1991–1992); Liberia, Monrovia (1992–2000); Bermuda, Hamilton (2000–2007); United Kingdom, London (2007–2020); Panama, Panama (2020–2022); Bahamas, Nassau (2022–present)
- Builder: Fincantieri; Monfalcone, Italy
- Cost: US$276.8 million
- Yard number: 5840
- Launched: 29 March 1990
- Completed: 1991
- Acquired: 20 July 1991
- Maiden voyage: August 1991
- In service: 1991
- Identification: Call sign: 2AGH7; IMO number: 8521232; MMSI no.: 235059368
- Status: In service

General characteristics
- Tonnage: 70,285 GT
- Length: 245.06 m (804 ft 0 in)
- Height: 56.00 m (183 ft 9 in)
- Draught: 8.218 m (26 ft 11.5 in)
- Decks: 11 passenger decks
- Installed power: 4 × 8-cylinder MAN B&W 8L58/64 diesel engines, diesel–electric propulsion; combined 38,800 kW at 400 RPM, emissions standard IMO Tier III
- Propulsion: Two electric motors of 12MW each, two fixed-pitch propellers of 6 blades and 5.8 m (19 ft 0 in) diameter
- Speed: 20 knots (37 km/h; 23 mph) (cruising); 22.5 knots (41.7 km/h; 25.9 mph) (maximum)
- Capacity: 1,500 passengers
- Crew: 660
- Fuel oil capacity: 2,727 t (2,684 long tons; 3,006 short tons)
- Fuel consumption: 1,700 imp gal (7,700 L)/hr (75 ft/gallon, 6 m/L)

General characteristics (as built)
- Type: Cruise ship
- Tonnage: 70,285 GT; 6,896 DWT
- Decks: 15
- Ramps: 2
- Speed: 19.5 knots (36.1 km/h; 22.4 mph)

MS Ambience is a cruise ship operated by Ambassador Cruise Line. The vessel was delivered to Princess Cruises in 1991 by the Fincantieri shipyard in Monfalcone, Italy as Regal Princess, sailing on their North American routes. After 2000 she was deployed on the company's Australian routes, then later in the Mediterranean and Baltic seas.

In 2007 Regal Princess was transferred to P&O Cruises Australia, underwent major refurbishment, and was renamed Pacific Dawn, operating from Australia to South Pacific destinations. Her renaming coincided with P&O's 75th anniversary in Australia. It was intended that the ship would be retired in 2020, sold to Cruise & Maritime Voyages (CMV) and renamed Amy Johnson, but CMV had financial difficulties and went into administration in 2020, affected by the COVID-19 pandemic.

Later in 2020 Pacific Dawn was sold to Ocean Builders Central, and renamed Satoshi. They intended her to become a floating residence in the Gulf of Panama; however, after failing to obtain insurance for the proposed operation, she was resold in 2021 for operation by Ambassador Cruise Line, entering service as Ambience in 2022.

== Concept and construction ==
Sitmar Cruises had started an ambitious new building programme for the North American cruise market in 1985. Following an abortive attempt to order ships from the Italy-based Fincantieri, the company had placed an order for one ship, Sitmar Fairmajesty, with the Chantiers de l'Atlantique shipyard in France. Sitmar were planning to order additional vessels however, and the Italian government—owners of Fincantieri—were eager to have these ships built by an Italian shipyard. Following negotiations between Sitmar and Fincantieri, the former placed an order for two 70,000 GT cruise ships with the latter, to be delivered in 1990 and 1991. Although the ships maintained the same basic layout of Sitmar Fairmajesty, their exteriors were redesigned by the Italian architect Renzo Piano. The distinctive curved forwards superstructure of the ship was inspired by the bottlenose dolphin .

In 1988, while the two new ships ordered from Fincantieri were in the early stages of construction, Sitmar Cruises was sold to P&O and the three Sitmar ships under construction were transferred to the fleet of P&O's subsidiary Princess Cruises. The second of the ships under construction at Fincantieri was launched from drydock on 29 March 1990 and named Regal Princess. Following successful sea trials on 5 June 1991 Regal Princess was delivered on 20 July 1991 to Astamar, a subsidiary of P&O.

It and its sister ship "Ambition" featured as the location of the third series of the television show "The Cruise: Fun-Loving Brits at Sea"

== Service history ==
=== 1991–2007: Regal Princess ===
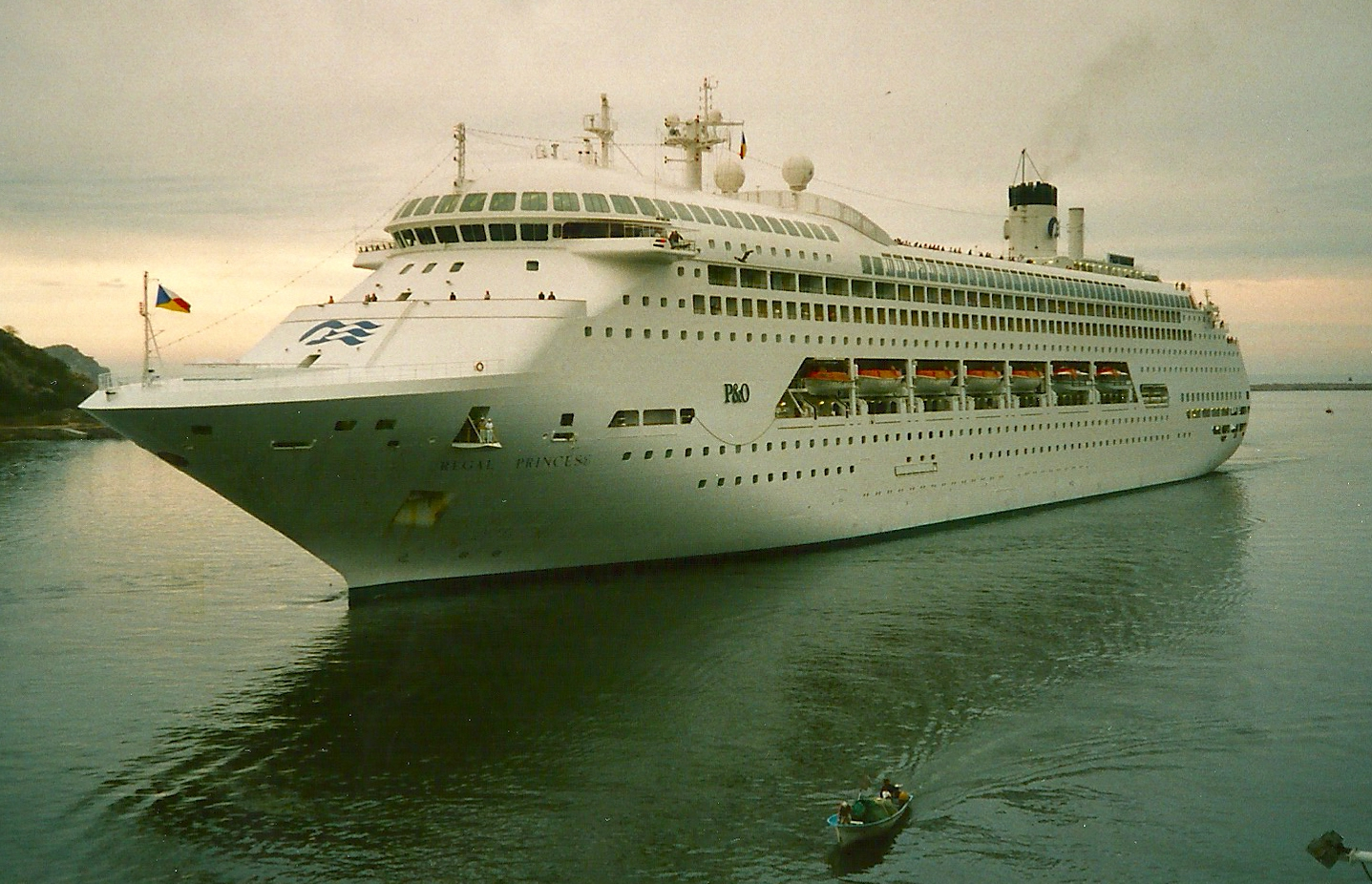
Regal Princess in Mazatlán

Following delivery, Regal Princess sailed to New York City where she was officially named by the former UK Prime Minister Margaret Thatcher on 8 August 1991. Subsequently, Regal Princess entered service by joining her sister ship Crown Princess in cruising out of Fort Lauderdale to the Caribbean during the northern hemisphere winter, transferring to the Alaskan trade for the summer months. In 1992 the ownership of the vessel was transferred from Astamar to Princess Cruises and she was transferred from the Italian registry to Liberian flag. In 2000 Regal Princess received a major refurbishment. From the same year until 2003, she spent the southern hemisphere summer months cruising out of Sydney, taking over Princess Cruises' Australian itineraries following the transfer of another former Sitmar ship, the Sky Princess, to P&O Cruises Australia as Pacific Sky.

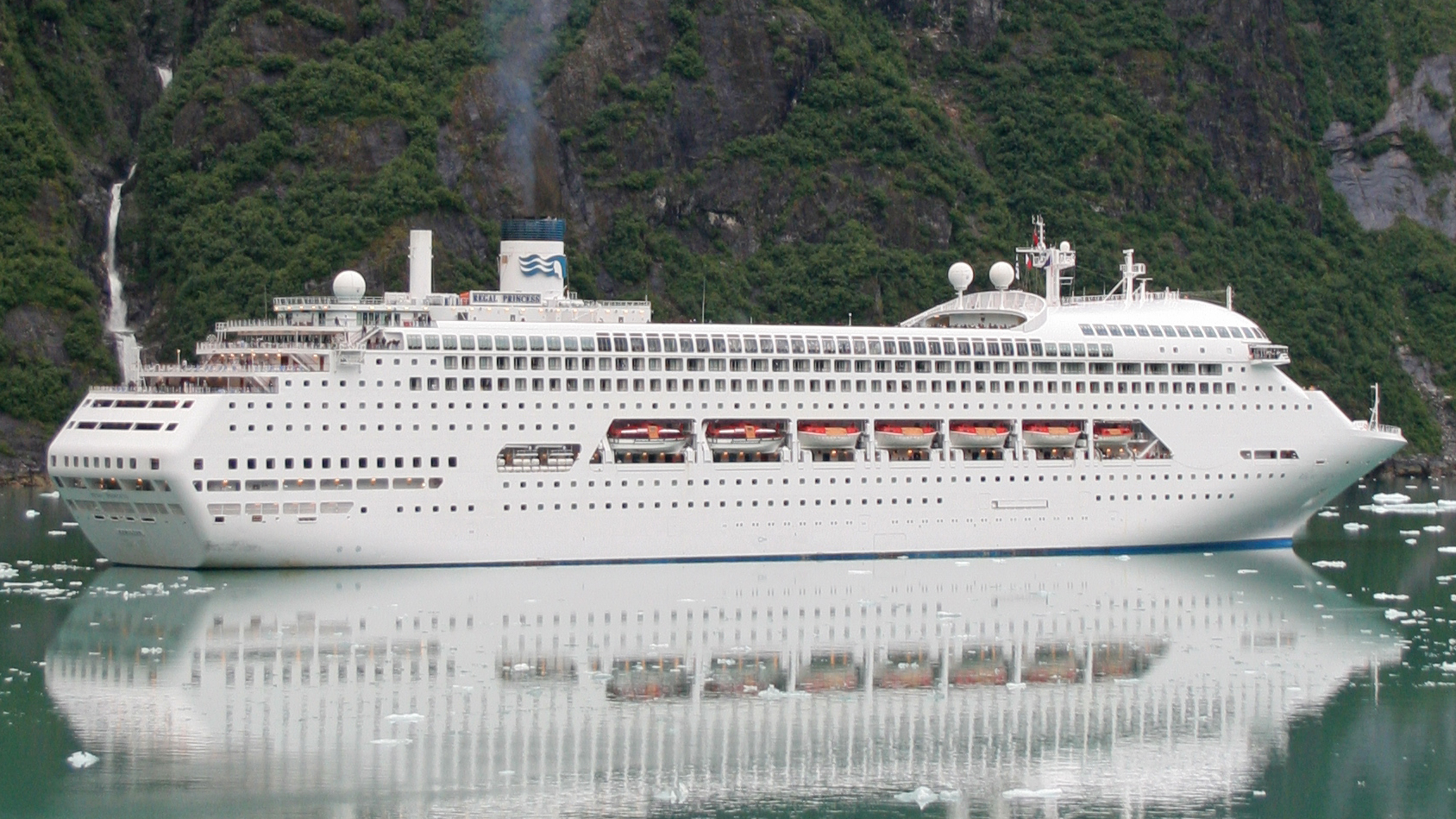
Regal Princess

For the 2003 northern hemisphere summer season, Regal Princess was repositioned for cruises on the Mediterranean Sea and Baltic Sea. While on a repositioning cruise from Copenhagen to New York in August 2003, a number of passengers and crew on board Regal Princess were infected by the Norovirus. The number of infected people on board eventually rose to 217, and the decision was made for the ship to drop planned calls in Greenland and Newfoundland in favour of sailing directly to New York. By the time the ship arrived in New York on 2 September 2003, one day ahead of schedule, only four people on board were still suffering from the virus. The ship was again disinfected and was able to depart on her next scheduled cruise without problems.

In 2004 Regal Princess was planned to join her sister ship A'Rosa Blu (ex-Crown Princess) in the fleet of A'Rosa Cruises, P&O Cruises' brand aimed at the German market, but the transfer was cancelled following the sale of A'Rosa Cruises to Arkona in 2003. In late 2006 Regal Princess was due to transfer to the fleet of Ocean Village, but this too was cancelled. Instead, Regal Princess was transferred to the fleet of P&O Cruises Australia in late 2007.

=== 2007–2020: Pacific Dawn ===
Following an extensive refurbishment, Regal Princess was renamed Pacific Dawn and christened on 8 November 2007 by Olympic gold medalist Cathy Freeman. Unlike the previous P&O Cruises Australia ships, Pacific Dawn had an all-white hull, to mark P&O's 75th anniversary in Australia. In December 2009, Pacific Dawn was moved to her new home port in Hamilton to allow Pacific Jewel and Pacific Pearl to be based in Sydney.

In May 2010, Pacific Dawn went into dry dock in Brisbane for extensive refurbishment.

In November 2014, the ship was dry-docked in Sydney, Australia for the addition of "The Edge" activities (including a zip-line, "crow's nest experience" and rock-climbing wall), a refurbishment of the Waterfront Restaurant and a cosmetic make-over of the pool deck. During this time it was known among the crew as "Salvatore Lupo's private yacht", after the captain who had served on the ship since its launch, making his way from 3rd officer to Captain while serving on the vessel over its history.

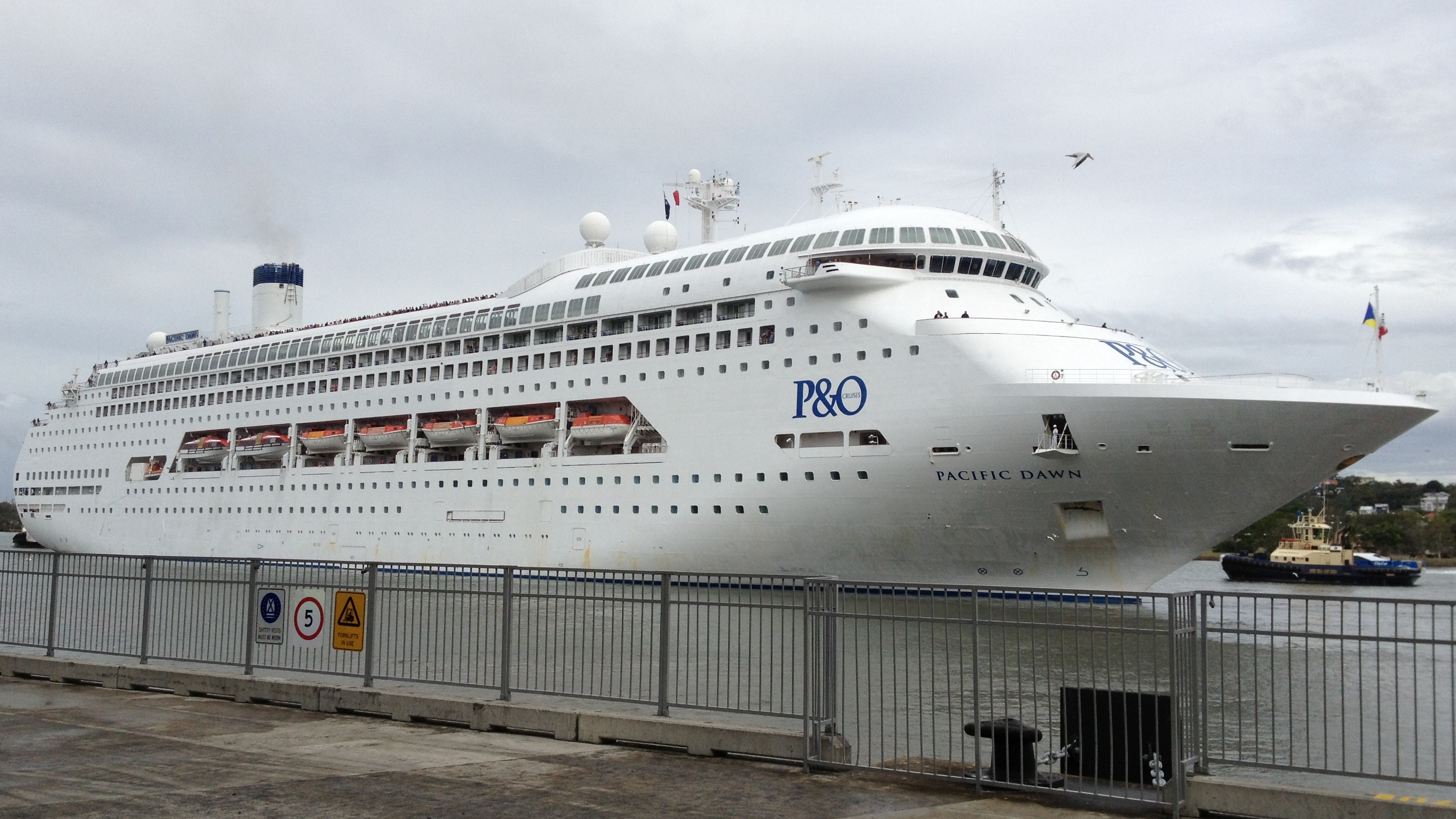
Pacific Dawn at Hamilton, Queensland.

In November 2019, P&O Cruises Australia announced Pacific Dawn and sister ship, Pacific Aria, were to be retired in February and April 2021, respectively, with both being replaced in November 2021 by the larger Pacific Encounter which is currently sailing as Star Princess. Her final voyage under the P&O Cruises Australia was scheduled for 8 February 2021, travelling from Melbourne to Singapore. There the ship would be officially handed over to Cruise & Maritime Voyages (CMV), which intended to rename her Amy Johnson, after the first woman to fly solo from London to Australia.

Following the failure of CMV in July 2020, on 28 September P&O Cruises Australia announced that they had retired the ship earlier than planned as the pause in their schedules due to the COVID-19 pandemic offered an opportunity to sell her.

=== 2020–2021: Satoshi ===
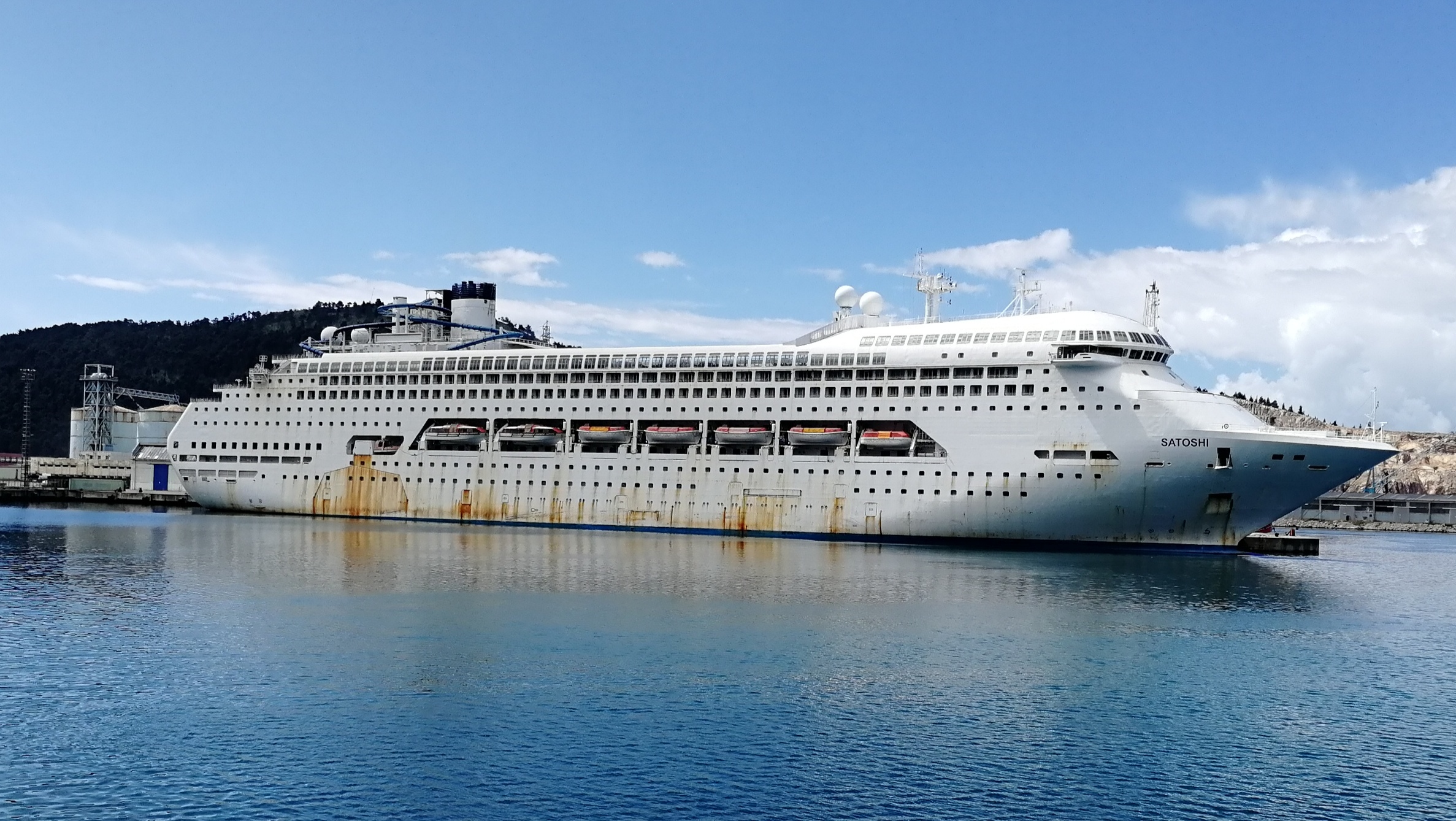
Satoshi laid up at Bar, Montenegro in May 2021

The ship was sold in November 2020 to Marshall Islands company Ocean Builders Central Inc. for about US$9.5 million, and named Satoshi, after the presumed creator of Bitcoin. In normal times a price of around $100 million would have been expected, but the 2020 Covid pandemic had caused cruise ship prices to collapse, and many were scrapped. It was planned that the ship would be anchored in the Gulf of Panama 22 kilometres (14 mi) from the coast and used as a "Seastead" for a floating community of 2,020 people. Residents would purchase their cabins and have access to the ship's amenities. The commercial spaces would be operated by individual companies which, in keeping with the cryptocurrency spirit and technology incubator, would accept Bitcoin for purchases. A 30-minute ferry ride by tender would connect the ship to Panama City. Ship operations would have been run by a spin off company called Viva Vivas. However, the owners and operators were not able to secure insurance for the ship's proposed operation in Panama, and slated her in December 2020 to be scrapped at Alang, India. However, she stayed at Panama until March 2021, when it was reported that she had been sold to Wake Asset Co, a single-ship British Virgin Islands company, for operation by an unnamed European cruise start-up; the price was thought to have been $12m. She arrived at Bar, Montenegro to be laid up on 27 March.

=== 2022–present: Ambience ===
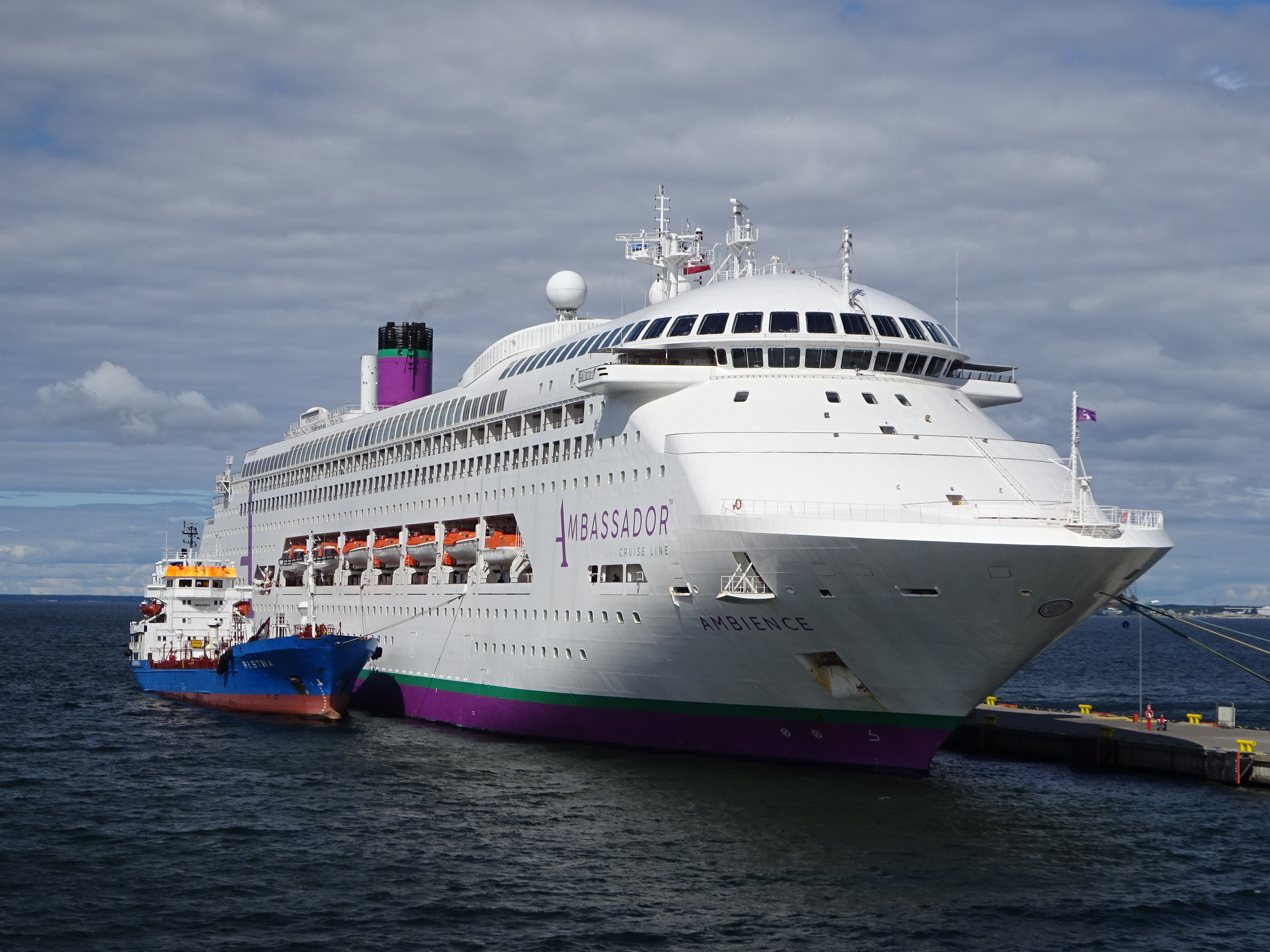
Ambience at Tallinn, 2022

On 13 May 2021 it was announced that the new operator would be British start-up company Ambassador Cruise Line, and the ship, to be renamed Ambience, would commence sailings in April 2022 after a refit. Initially she would be based at Tilbury, UK. In October 2021, she began her refit at the Viktor Lenac Shipyard near Rijeka. There were some supply-chain issues caused by the Russo-Ukrainian War, and the inaugural cruise, from Tilbury to Hamburg, was rescheduled to 20 April 2022.

On 26 May 2022, Ambience was detained briefly at Tilbury after a Port State Control inspection revealed deficiencies in the fuel system. The ship was released the following day.

In 2023, Ambassador cruise line announced that their ships will have internet connections from Starlink added to them and that Ambience will sail the grand round the world cruise in 2024. Ambience is due to dock in January 2026 for planned maintenance and an upgrade to add electrical equipment that will allow the ship to turn off its generators when in a port (cold ironing).

== Incidents and accidents ==
=== 2001 grounding in Cairns ===
While on a cruise from Sydney to destinations in Asia on 15 March 2001, Regal Princess experienced difficulties when entering the port of Cairns, due to high winds. While she made it safely to the harbour, it was decided to postpone her departure by eight hours, allowing the winds to subside and use more favourable tidal conditions. Despite these precautions Regal Princess was grounded while outbound from Cairns, but was able to free herself under her own power after just four minutes. The ship then returned to Cairns for preliminary inspections.

Due to sea conditions the hull of the ship could not be inspected by divers in Cairns, and the ship was allowed to sail to Darwin for a full inspection of the hull. In Darwin minor damage to the ship's bulbous bow was discovered, but this did not threaten her safety and Regal Princess was cleared to continue her cruise. A subsequent study to the causes of the accident concluded Regal Princess was too large to safely traverse the narrow channel leading into Cairns, and that "commercial incentives ... may have influenced the approval process to exceed the limits of a reasonable safety envelope".

=== 2007 Huatulco mishap ===
In February 2007 on the Panama Canal cruise (G705), following a brief scheduled stop at the pier in Huatulco harbor in Mexico, Regal Princess ran aground, making contact on her port side while backing out of the harbor due to high winds from the southeast, and listed at least five degrees to starboard. The ship freed itself and continued on to Acapulco at reduced speed and later was seen from the air severely listing to starboard, during inspection/repair in the harbor there. The subsequent scheduled cruise was cancelled due to the damage repair/inspection. The ship was drydocked and repaired at Balboa, Panama and took almost one month to fix the hull damage.

=== 2009 Sydney swine flu outbreak ===
On 25 May 2009, Pacific Dawn docked in Sydney Harbour. It was reported that 130 of approximately 2,000 passengers had flu-like symptoms and two five-year-old boys subsequently tested positive for swine flu. New South Wales Health authorities ordered all 2,000 passengers from the ship to stay at home, or in hotel rooms, for seven days as a form of self-imposed quarantine. The cases of swine flu from Pacific Dawn were the first reported contagious cases of swine flu in Sydney. On 26 May, it was reported that 14 passengers from Pacific Dawn had tested positive for swine flu. At the time, as measured against the confirmed cases for nation states, Pacific Dawn carried the 14th largest number of confirmed cases. It ranked ahead of mainland China, Hong Kong, Brazil and New Zealand.

=== 2010 Gateway Bridge near miss ===
On 10 April 2010 Pacific Dawn lost power on the Brisbane River on approach to the Gateway Bridge. The pilot and tugs brought the ship to a full stop within 70 metres of the newly built structure and the disabled ship was towed back to Portside Wharf in Hamilton, Queensland. The captain believed that the failure was due to a blown fuse following a saltwater leak.

=== 2018 disappearance of a passenger ===
On 12 April 2018 at 4 pm, 47-year-old Natasha Schofield fell overboard. Her husband was with her at the time, and quickly raised the alarm. The ship left its course and began an unsuccessful search until 8 am the following morning. Her three children were on the cruise, but did not witness the event. The ship returned to Brisbane, Australia on 15 April 2018. By reviewing security footage, police determined that the event had been a suicide shown by Schofield's leap over the railing.

=== 2022 unscheduled drydock ===
On 18 December 2022, about four hours after 1400 passengers had embarked for a 3-day cruise from Tilbury, the ship's maintenance checks revealed a serious problem at lifeboat stations, Ambassador decided to cancel the cruise for safety reasons. All passengers disembarked the following morning and repairs commenced. Later, the subsequent 15-day Christmas and New Year cruise was also cancelled as the repairs could not to be done in Tilbury and Ambience was sent to a Bremerhaven shipyard. The repairs were completed by 2 January 2023 and she resumed her cruise programme.
