= MV Columbus =

Cruise ship

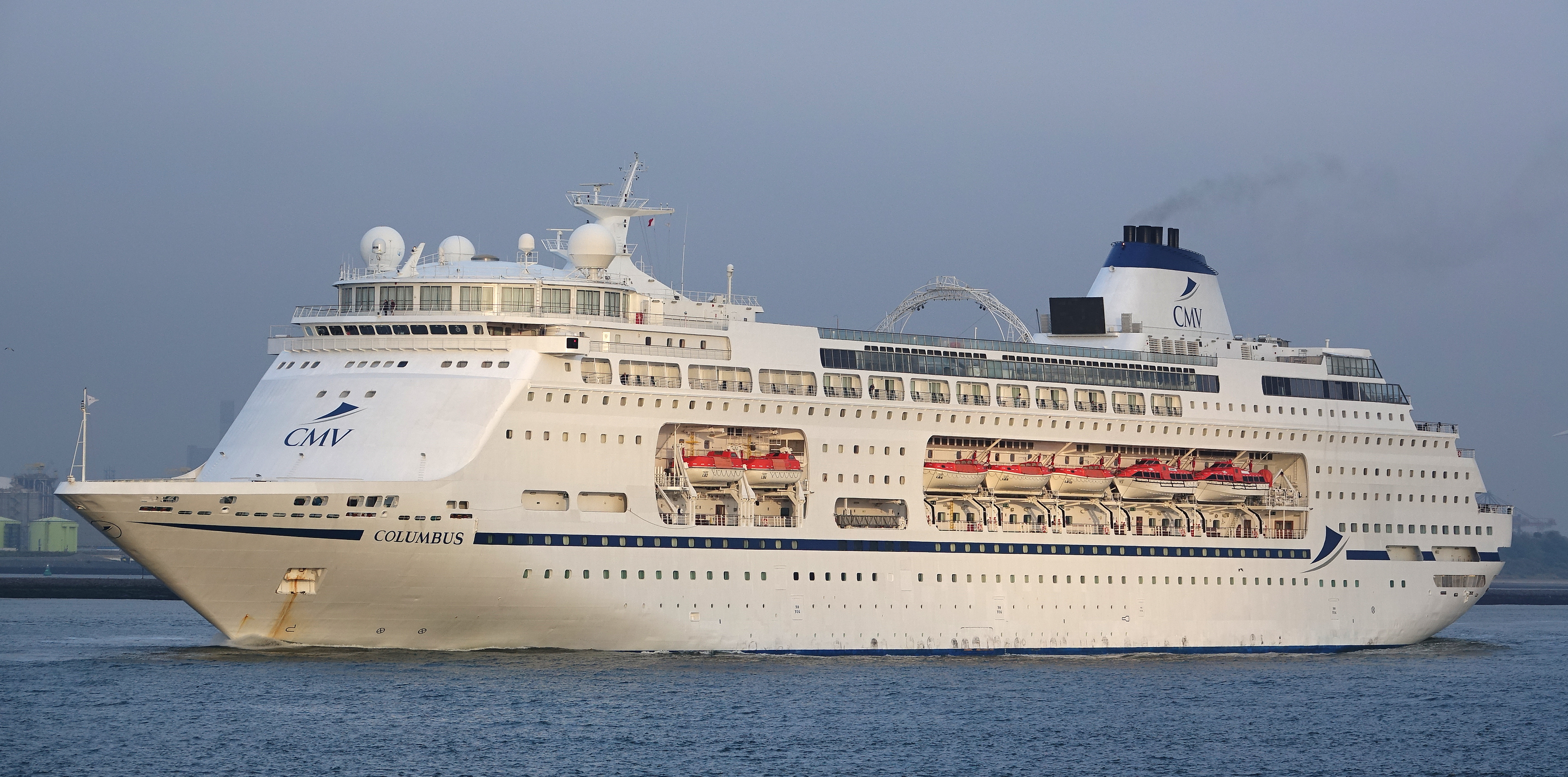
- Columbus in Hook of Holland on 29 July 2018.

History
- Name: Sitmar Fair Majesty (1988–1989); Star Princess (1989–1997); Arcadia (1997–2003); Ocean Village (2003–2010); Pacific Pearl (2010–2017); Columbus (2017–2021); Colus (2021–2021)
- Owner: Sitmar Cruises (Construction only 1987–1988); Princess Cruises (1989–1997); P&O Cruises (1997–2003); Ocean Village (2003–2010); P&O Cruises Australia (2010–2017); Cruise & Maritime Voyages (2017–2020); Seajets (2020–2021)
- Operator: Princess Cruises (1989–1997); P&O Cruises (1997–2003); Ocean Village (2003–2010); P&O Cruises Australia (2010–2017); Cruise & Maritime Voyages (2017–2020)
- Port of registry: Liberia, Monrovia (1989–1997); UK, London (1997–2017); Bahamas, Nassau (2017–2021); Comoros, Moroni (2021–2021)
- Builder: Chantiers de l'Atlantique
- Launched: 28 May 1988
- Completed: 15 March 1989
- Maiden voyage: 1989
- In service: 1989
- Out of service: 2020
- Identification: Call sign: C6CP4; IMO number: 8611398; MMSI number: 311000535
- Fate: Scrapped at Alang, India in 2021.

General characteristics
- Tonnage: 63,500 GT
- Length: 247 m (810 ft 4 in)
- Beam: 32 m (105 ft 0 in)
- Draught: 8.2 m (26 ft 11 in)
- Decks: Passengers: 11; Overall: 13
- Installed power: Four diesel engines
- Propulsion: Diesel-electric
- Speed: 21.5 knots (39.8 km/h; 24.7 mph)
- Capacity: 1,400 (Normal), 1,856 (Maximum)
- Crew: 700

MV Columbus was a cruise ship. She was built by Chantiers de l'Atlantique, at their shipyard in Saint-Nazaire, France, and launched in 1988 as Sitmar Fair Majesty. Originally ordered for Sitmar Cruises, with the merger of Sitmar Cruises into Princess, she first entered service with Princess Cruises as Star Princess in 1989. From 1997 to 2003, she served in the P&O Cruises fleet as MV Arcadia. She was renamed Ocean Village in 2003 when the brand was established. Ocean Village was the sole cruise ship of the Ocean Village brand after the Ocean Village Two became the Pacific Jewel. In 2010 the Ocean Village brand ceased its operations and she was transferred to P&O Cruises Australia and renamed Pacific Pearl. She served in the P&O Cruises Australia fleet until 2017 when she was sold to Cruise & Maritime Voyages and renamed MV Columbus. Following CMV entering administration in 2020, the Ship was auctioned by CW Kellock & Co. in London on 12 October 2020, for US$5,321,000 to Marios Iliopoulos of Seajets, and some months later resold to scrap in Eleusis Bay. In 2021 she was sold for scrap in Alang, India where she was beached and dismantled.

== History ==
=== Star Princess ===
Sitmar FairMajesty had been launched and named but was still being fitted out when Sitmar was taken over by P&O in 1988. She was subsequently renamed Star Princess when she commenced operating for P&O's Princess Cruises division in 1989. On 23 June 1995 at 01:42 Star Princess struck Poundstone Rock in Favorite Channel while sailing the Lynn Canal from Skagway to Juneau Alaska. There were no injuries or deaths. Damage to the Star Princess was substantial. Repairs cost over $7 million and lost revenue was estimated at US$20 million. The repaired Star Princess resumed her cruise schedule on 7 August 1995.

=== Arcadia ===
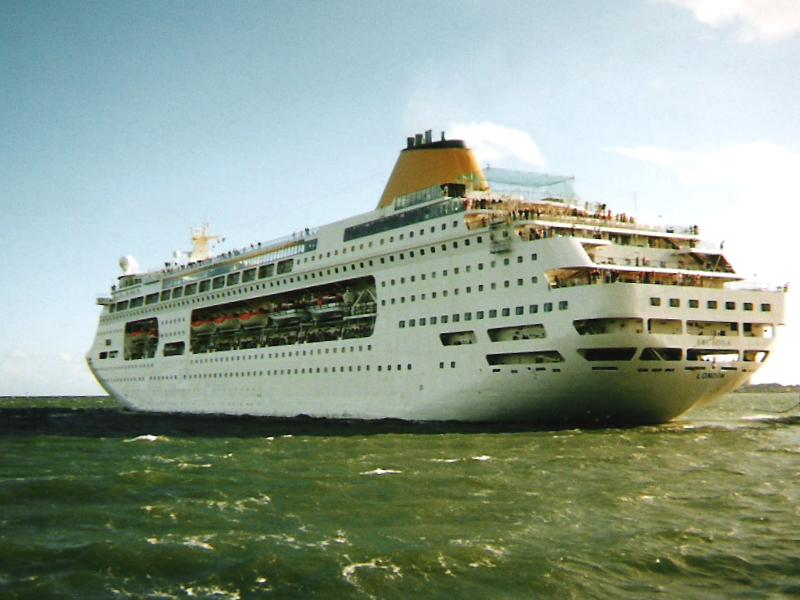
Arcadia leaving Station Pier, Melbourne in April 1999

In 1997 she was transferred to P&O's Southampton based UK fleet as a replacement for SS Canberra, which was sold for scrap that year. She was refitted for her new role at Harland and Wolff, shipyard in Belfast.

She was renamed Arcadia, in honour of an earlier P&O liner of the same name that served the UK-Australia route, and a new Princess Cruises ship took the name Star Princess.

=== Arcadia to Ocean Village refit ===
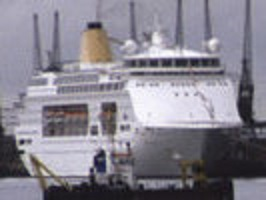
Arcadia docked at Southampton, England in September 2000

In 2003, P&O inaugurated its Ocean Village brand of cruises aimed at young people and families. Arcadia was renamed Ocean Village to undertake these cruises. She was repainted with a more colourful livery featuring a vivid purple, yellow and red swoosh on the bow as part of the refit. Modifications were also made to the public areas and accommodation. The work was carried out between 28 March and 17 April 2003 at Lloyd Werft Bremerhaven.

=== Ocean Village ===
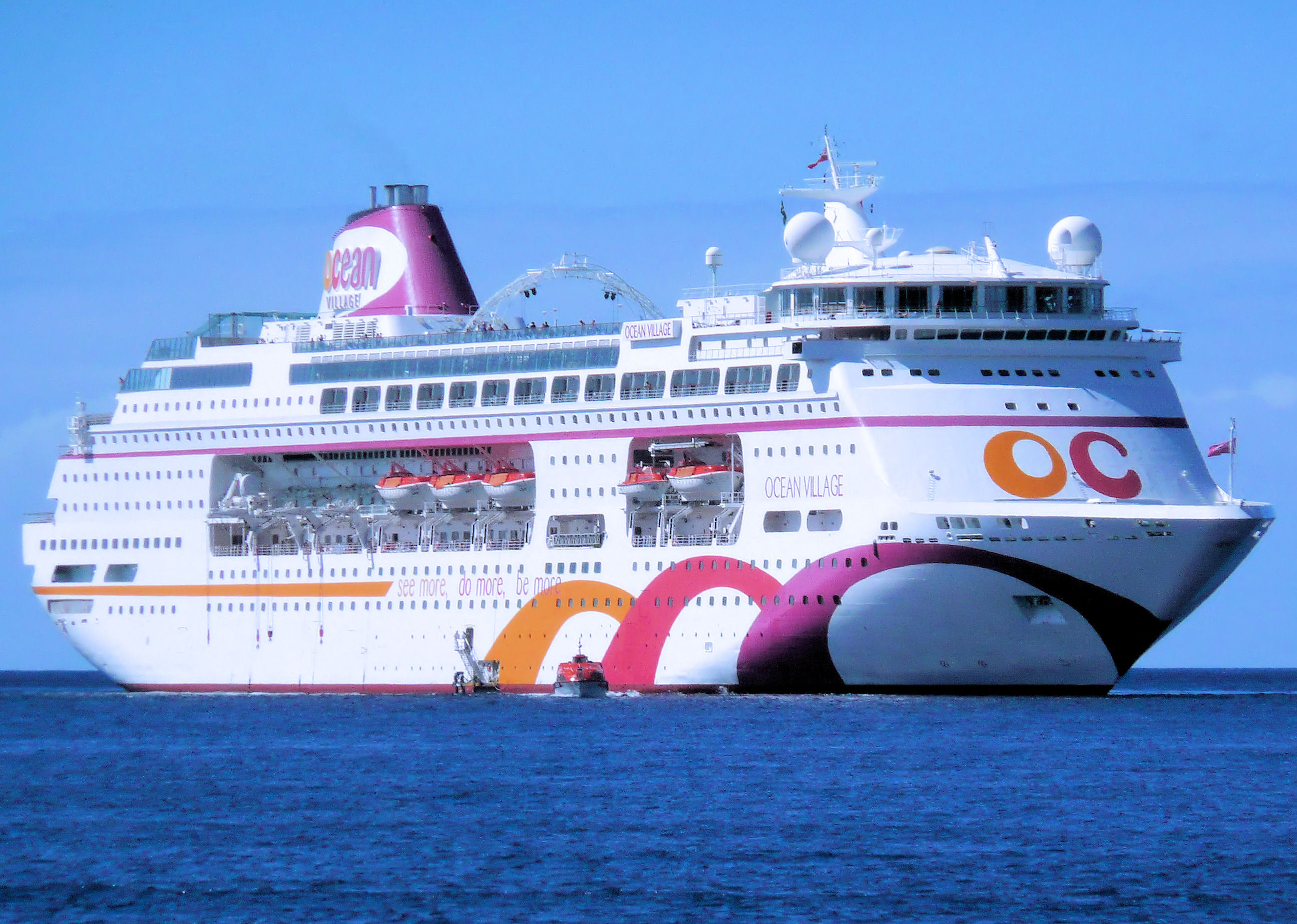
Ocean Village in Dominica, Caribbean in December 2008

Ocean Village was the only ship in the Ocean Village fleet after 2009, a former brand of Carnival UK. It was aimed at mature cruisers who prefer casual informal cruising. The ship was sailing from Bridgetown, Barbados in the winter and from Palma de Mallorca, Spain in the summer.

Onboard features included a 3-storey atrium called Village Square incorporating shops, a performance space, coffee and cocktail bars. A 2-storey show lounge called the Marquee featured tribute acts and dance/show routines from the onboard cast. A second smaller lounge called Connexions was used for comedy and light entertainment, a traditional English Pub called the Oval with occasional sports shown on TV, a nightclub called Bayside, cinema called the Movie Drome, 2 swimming pools (Crystal and Riviera), 4 jacuzzis, a kids and teens-club, 2 Gyms, a sports net area and a health Spa. Food is provided in two buffet style restaurants Waterfront and Plantation (the latter of which is open 24hrs), and two waiter service restaurants called La Luna and the Bistro for which supplements were charged.

During the transformation from Arcadia to Ocean Village, a large steel arch was fitted over the lido deck, used for acrobatic shows, during which the ship has to be slowed to around 5 to 8 knots (9.3 to 14.8 km/h; 5.8 to 9.2 mph).

==== Farewell sail ====
Ocean Village sailed on her final farewell voyage on 21 October, a 23-day cruise stopping at Cairo-Egypt (from Port Said), visiting the Suez Canal, Safaga, Egypt, Muscat, Oman, Dubai, United Arab Emirates, Cochin, India, Langkawi, Malaysia, Kuala Lumpur (from Port Kelang, Malaysia) and finally stopping at Singapore where she entered dry dock to become Pacific Pearl, also marking the end of Ocean Village Cruise Line. There was the option for a 30-day cruise, a week in the Mediterranean and the final cruise itself, both the 23 or the 30 day cruises were adults only. The port call at Dubai was changed to Fujairah over security concerns. Passengers heading to Dubai took a free shuttle service, which was about a two-hour bus ride away from the port.

=== P&O Cruises Australia ===
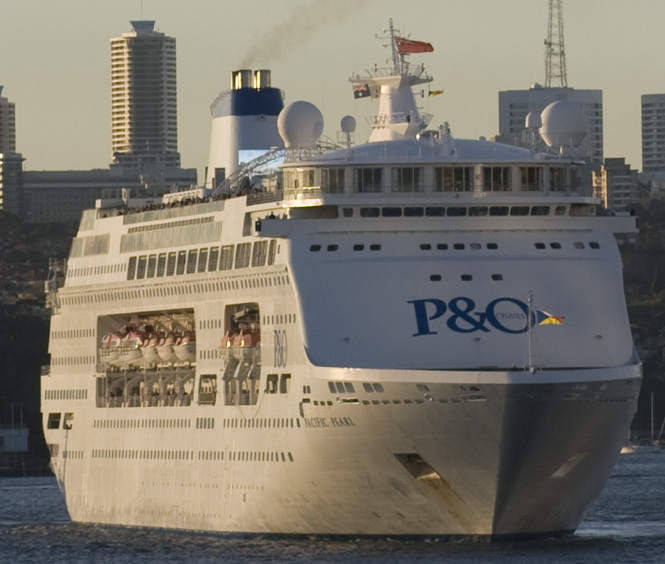
Pacific Pearl

On 30 October 2008, Carnival Corporation & plc announced the closure of their Ocean Village brand. Coinciding with this both Ocean Village ships were to be transferred to the fleet of P&O Cruises Australia. Ocean Village joined the P&O Australia fleet as Pacific Pearl towards the end of 2010. Her first sailing as Pacific Pearl was on 22 December 2010.

==== Farewell sail ====
On 3 March 2016, P&O Cruises Australia announced that the Pacific Pearl would be transferring out of the fleet in March 2017. Having completed 294 cruises for P&O, the Pacific Pearl has carried more than half a million passengers over five years. On 7 March 2016 it was announced that the ship will be transferred to Cruise & Maritime Voyages as the Columbus becoming its new flagship. The farewell voyage of the ship commenced in Auckland on 27 March 2017, spanning 16 days and docking at six ports before finally ending in Singapore on 12 April 2017. The Pacific Jewel replaced her services out of New Zealand.

=== Cruise & Maritime Voyages ===
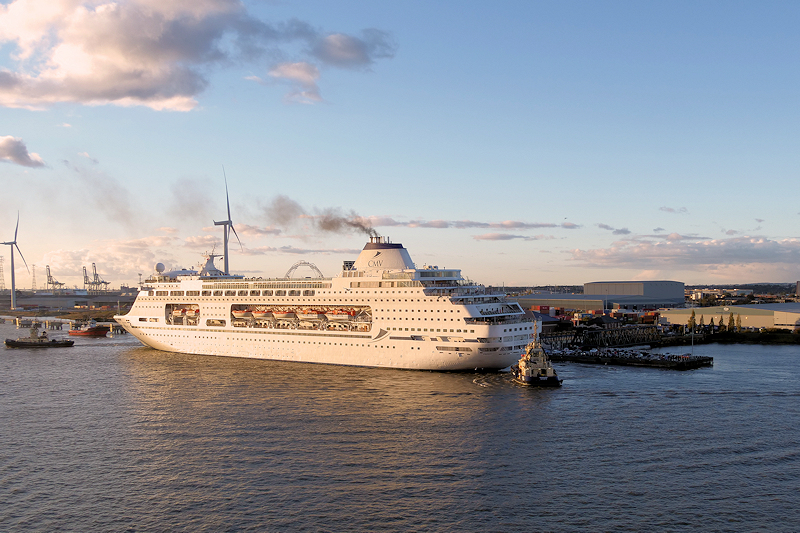
MV Columbus

On 12 April 2017, after being handed over to CMV she consequently departed Singapore as the Pacific Pearl sailed to Damen Shiprepair Schiedam in Rotterdam, The Netherlands and underwent dry dock to become Columbus. In 2018, she underwent dry dock with Damen Shiprepair in Amsterdam.

In March 2020, CMV's operations were temporarily shut down, along with the rest of the cruise industry, to combat the spread of COVID-19 pandemic. By July 2020, CMV had entered administration. On 12 October 2020, Columbus was auctioned by CW Kellock & Co. London, and was sold to Greek ferry operator Seajets. The ship was bought by SeaJets, but due to the ship aging and other problems, SeaJets sold her for scrap in Alang. She was beached in Alang, India for scrap on 12 April 2021 and scrapping begin on 5 August 2021.

== See also ==
- Pacific Dawn
