= Karnika =

Cruise ship operated by Jalesh Cruises

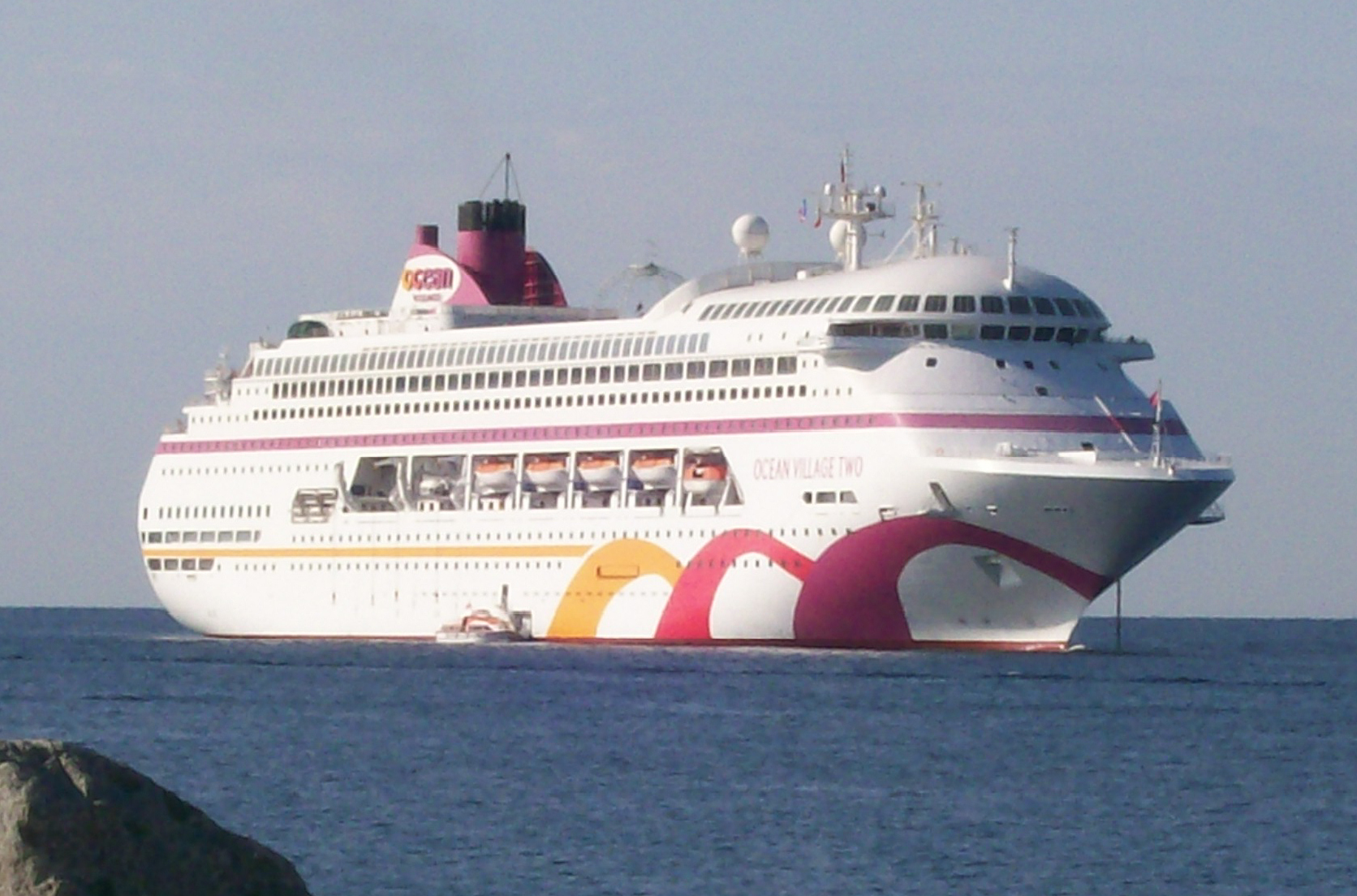
- Ocean Village Two. later Karnika, at anchor in Saint-Raphaël, France on January 27, 2009

History
- Name: 1990–2002: Crown Princess; 2002–2004: A'Rosa Blu; 2004–2007: AIDAblu; 2007–2009: Ocean Village Two; 2009–2019: Pacific Jewel; 2019–2020: Karnika
- Owner: 1990–2000: Princess Cruises; 2000–2003: P&O Princess Cruises; 2003–2019: Carnival Corporation; 2019–2020: Zen Cruises; 2020: NKD Maritime
- Operator: 1990–2002: Princess Cruises; 2002–2004: A'Rosa Cruises; 2004–2007: AIDA Cruises; 2007–2009: Ocean Village; 2009–2019: P&O Cruises Australia; 2019–2020: Jalesh Cruises
- Port of registry: 1990–1992: Palermo, Italy; 1992–2000: Monrovia, Liberia; 2000–2002: Hamilton, Bermuda; 2002–2004: London, United Kingdom; 2004–2007: Genova, Italy; 2007–2019: London, United Kingdom; 2019–2020: Nassau, Bahamas
- Builder: Fincantieri; Monfalcone, Italy
- Cost: $ 276.8 million
- Yard number: 5939
- Launched: 25 May 1989
- Christened: 12 March 1990
- Completed: 1990
- Acquired: 29 June 1990
- Maiden voyage: 8 July 1990
- In service: 1990–2020
- Out of service: 2020
- Identification: Call sign: C6EG9; IMO number: 8521220; MMSI number: 311000892
- Fate: Scrapped in Alang, India, 2020/2021
- Notes: sister to MS Ambience

General characteristics (as built, 1990)
- Type: Cruise ship
- Tonnage: 69,845 GT; 6,995 DWT
- Length: 245.08 m (804 ft 1 in)
- Beam: 32.25 m (105 ft 10 in)
- Height: 56.00 m (183 ft 9 in)
- Draught: 7.90 m (25 ft 11 in)
- Decks: 11
- Installed power: 4 × MAN-B&W 8L58/64 diesel electric generators, combined power of 38,880kW
- Propulsion: 2 x 12MW Alsthom Motors driving fixed pitch propellers
- Speed: 22.5 knots (41.7 km/h; 25.9 mph)
- Capacity: 1,590 passengers (maximum)

General characteristics (as rebuilt, 2004)
- Tonnage: 70,285 GT; 5,758 DWT
- Height: 60.23 m (198 ft)-(actual height)
- Decks: 11 (passenger accessible)
- Capacity: 2,014 passengers (maximum)
- Crew: 621
- Notes: Other characteristics as above

Karnika was a cruise ship. Originally debuting in 1990, the vessel operated for numerous cruise lines throughout her history. She debuted as Crown Princess for Princess Cruises in 1990 before being transferred to A'Rosa Cruises as A'Rosa Blu in 2002. In 2004, she was transferred to AIDA Cruises as AIDAblu. In 2007, she was transferred to Ocean Village as Ocean Village Two. In 2009, she was transferred to P&O Cruises Australia as Pacific Jewel. In 2018, she was sold to Jalesh Cruises and renamed Karnika, debuting in 2019. Jalesh Cruises ceased operating in October 2020. She was sold for scrap in Alang, India in 2020.

== Design and specifications ==
As designed, the vessel measured 69,845 GT and 6,995 DWT. She has a length of 245.08 m (804 ft 1 in), a beam of 32.25 m (105 ft 10 in), and a draft of 7.90 m (25 ft 11 in). The two propeller shafts are driven by two 12,000 kW Alsthom motors. She is powered by four MAN-B&W 8L58/64 diesel generators, with a combined output of 38,880 kW and a maximum speed of 19.5 knots (36.1 km/h; 22.4 mph). The ship originally had a maximum guest capacity of 1,910 passengers. The cruise ship was built at a cost of US$276.8 million. Her distinctive curved profile—often referred to as 'dolphin-like'—was designed by Renzo Piano.

== History ==
=== 1990–2002: Crown Princess ===
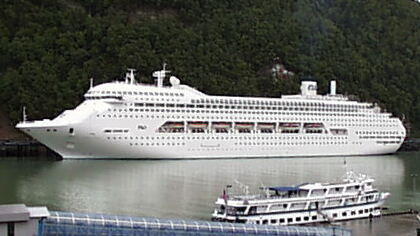
Crown Princess

Crown Princess was built by Fincantieri in Monfalcone, Italy, with the yard number 5839. She was launched on 25 May 1989. Crown Princess was handed over to P&O Group to be operated by Princess Cruises on 29 June 1990, and sailed her maiden voyage on 8 July 1990.

A second ship, named Regal Princess, was later built to the same design and delivered in 1991. Together, the two ships were ordered by Sitmar Cruises, and later transferred to P&O Princess Cruises after P&O acquired Sitmar Cruises.

=== 2002–2004: A'Rosa Blu ===
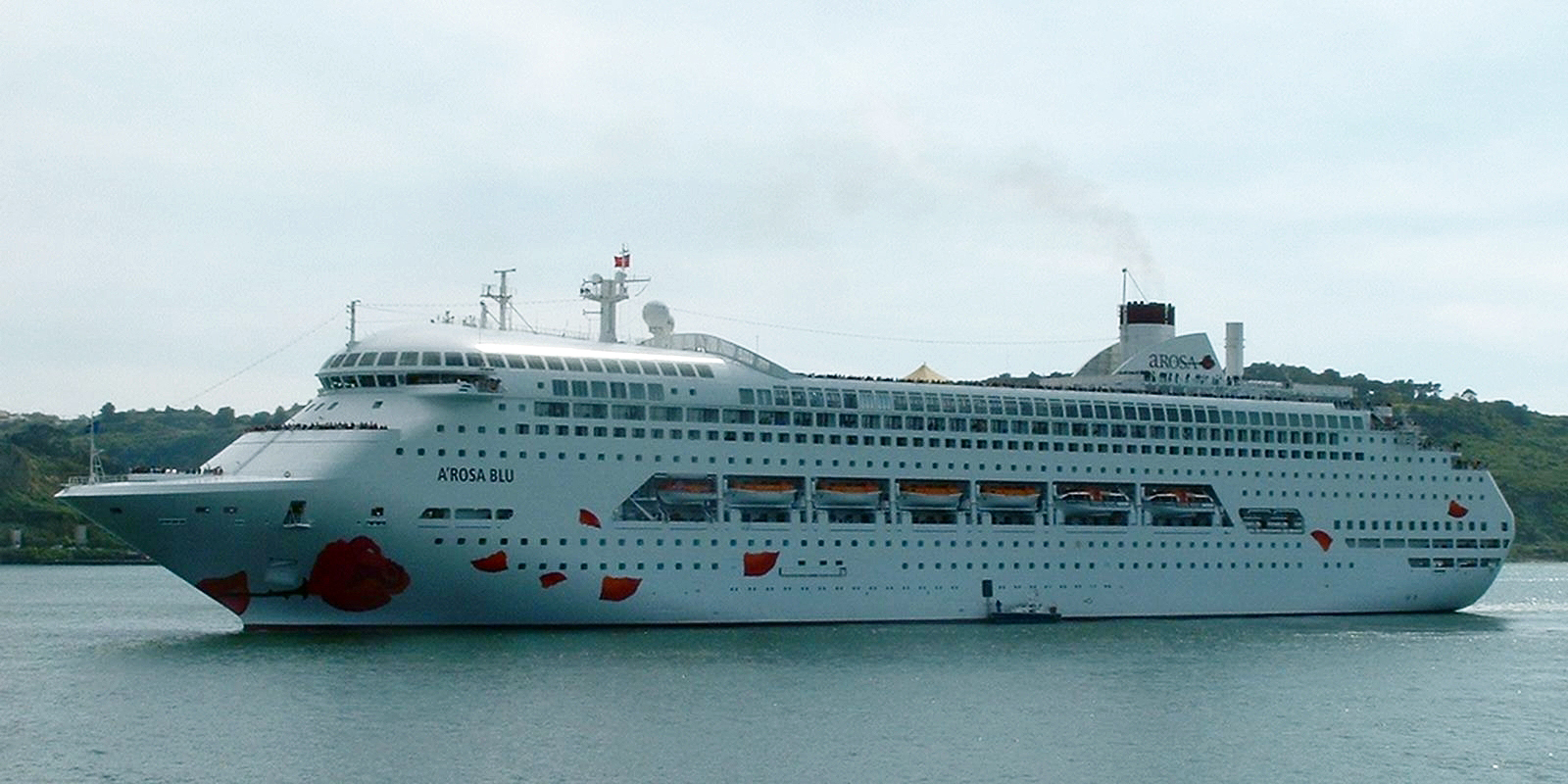
A'Rosa Blu

In July 2001, P&O Princess launched a new German-based cruise line called A'Rosa Cruises and announced Crown Princess would serve as the new brand's inaugural ship upon its debut in mid-2002. Crown Princess performed her last cruise, a sailing to the Mexican Riviera, in April 2002, and arrived at the Lloyd Werft shipyard in Bremerhaven in May, where she received an extensive month-long renovation. As A'Rosa Blu, she was marketed exclusively to the German market and sailed 7-to-14-day Northern Europe cruises from Warnemünde in the summer and Mediterranean cruises the rest of the year. A'Rosa's bookings were slow to build up in its first year of operations, but gradually improved in 2003. However, later that year, in September, following the merger of P&O Princess and Carnival Corporation, it was announced that A'Rosa and all related assets aside from A'Rosa Blu were being sold to Arkona in an effort to optimize savings and fleet utilization by consolidating the newly merged company's German operations.

=== 2004–2007: AIDAblu ===
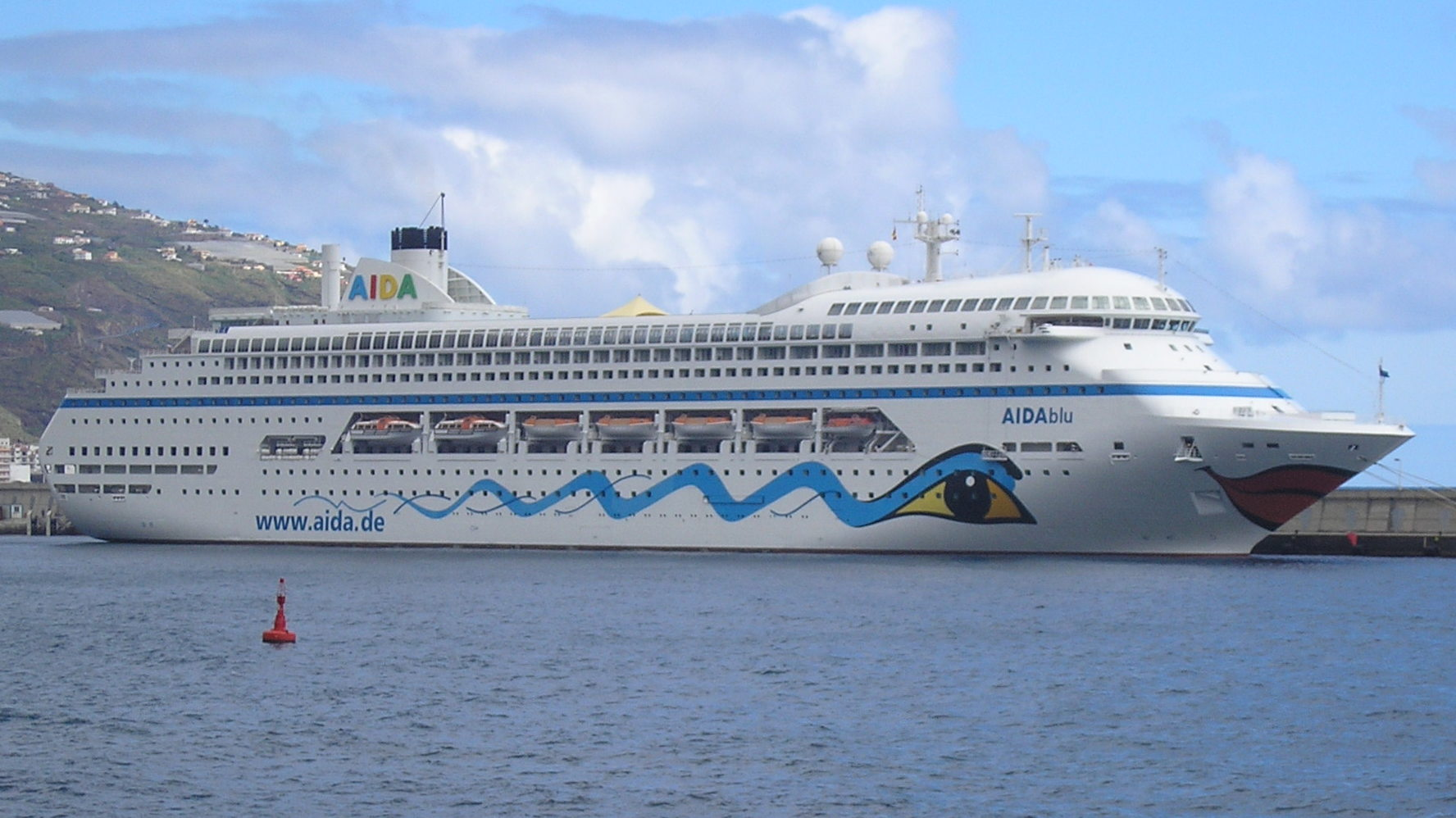
AIDAblu

In September 2003, Carnival Corporation announced that with the sale of the A'Rosa brand, A'Rosa Blu would be transferred to AIDA Cruises. Before joining AIDA as AIDAblu, she experienced the following changes in a refit: a guest capacity increase to 2,014, a crew complement expansion to 621, a gross tonnage increase to 70,285 GT, and a deadweight tonnage increase to 5,758 DWT.

=== 2007–2009: Ocean Village Two ===
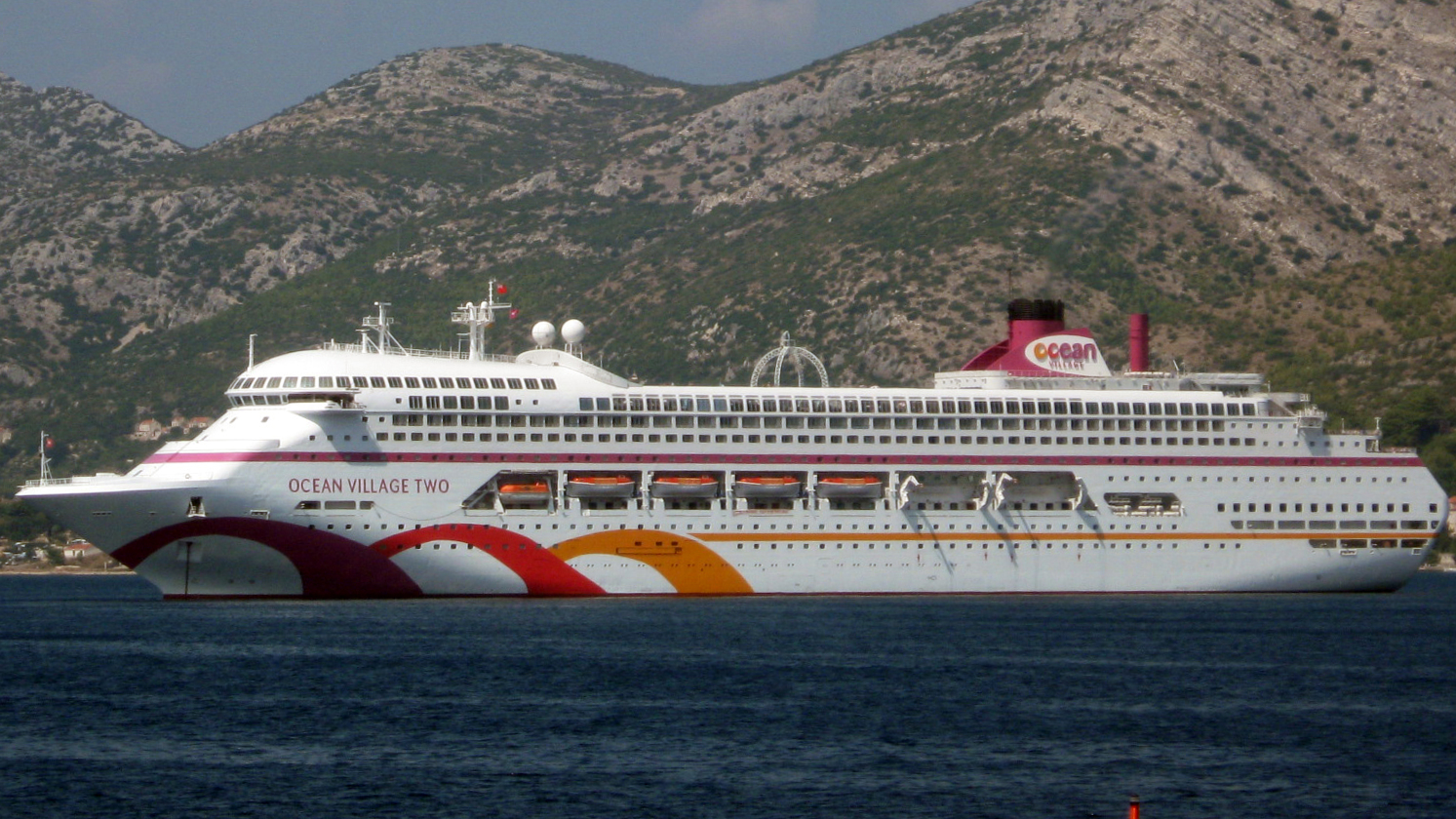
Ocean Village Two

On 4 August 2005, Carnival announced AIDAblu would be transferred to its U.K.-based brand, Ocean Village, in spring 2007. She was transferred to Ocean Village in April 2007, and after a small refit in Bremerhaven, was christened as Ocean Village Two by sisters Jodie Kidd and Jemma Kidd. 18 months after Ocean Village Two began operating for Ocean Village, on 30 October 2008, Carnival announced it was phasing out the brand, with both ships scheduled to be transferred to P&O Cruises Australia by the end of 2010, citing the company's focus towards investing in brands with the most potential. As Ocean Village Two, she was based in Crete in the summer and in Barbados in the winter. She departed on her final voyage on 22 October 2009 from Crete for Singapore.

=== 2009–2019: Pacific Jewel ===
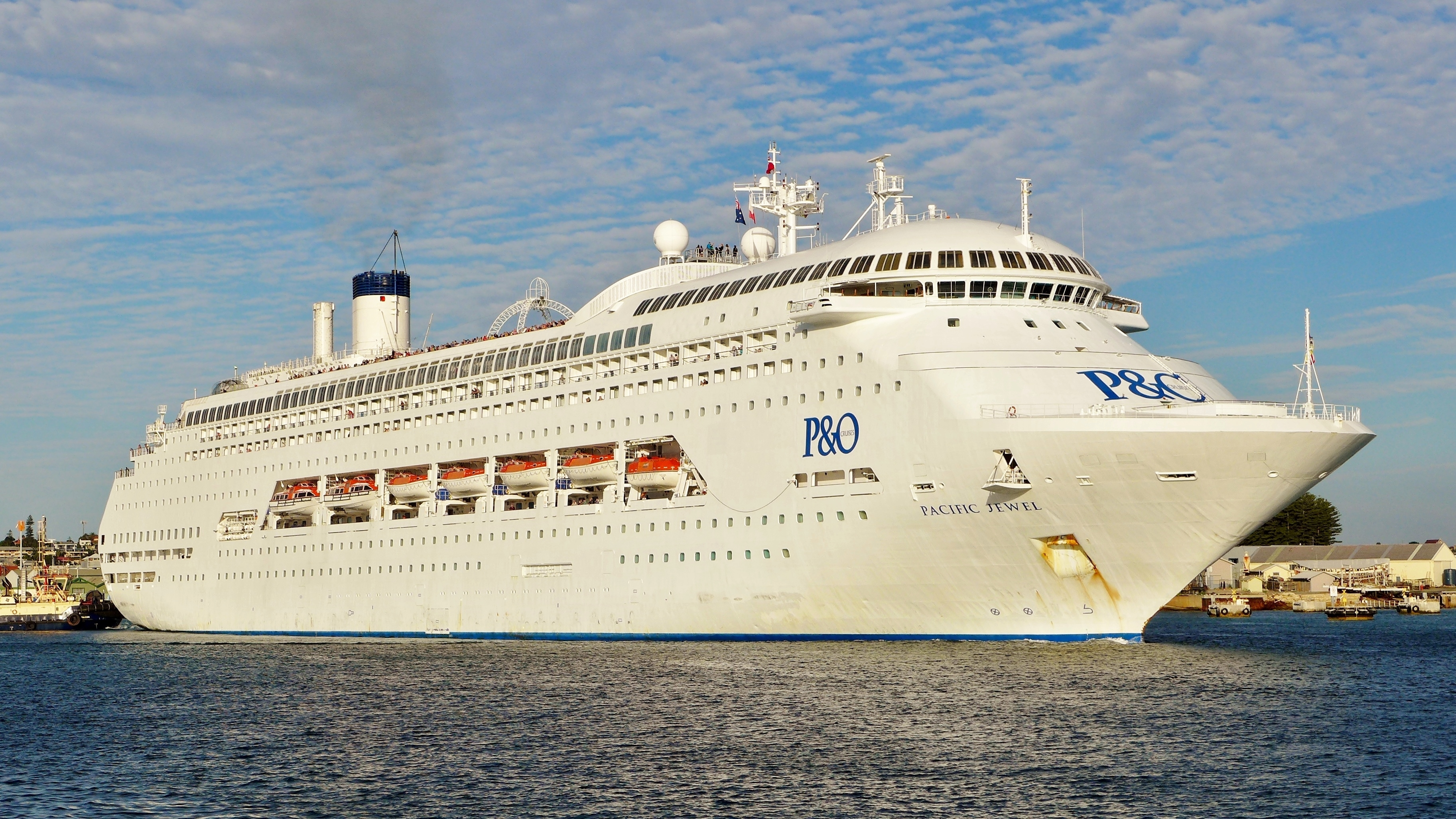
Pacific Jewel departing Fremantle, Western Australia, Australia, on 25 April 2015

The ship began her two-week refit on 14 November 2009 at the Sembcorp Marine shipyard in Sembawang, Singapore. The ship sailed for Sydney on 1 December 2009, where her naming festivities were held on 12 December 2009, in which she was christened by Quentin Bryce.

On 27 August 2010, Australian soap opera Neighbours filmed scenes on board Pacific Jewel. Actors and crew took five hours to shoot on and around the vessel's running track and circus arena on the top deck. Select crew members were also given the chance to be extras in the scenes. Travel Blackboard reported that P&O expected Pacific Jewel's appearance on the show to generate more than AU$1 million worth of brand exposure to the Australian audience.

Later that year, in October and November, a fault had developed in the ship's propulsion system, forcing the cancellation of three cruises.

On 22 August 2018, P&O Cruises Australia announced that Pacific Jewel would leave the fleet in March 2019 and be replaced by Star Princess, with the final voyage scheduled for 24 February 2019 from Melbourne.

=== 2019–2020: Karnika ===
On 30 August 2018, it was reported that Pacific Jewel had been sold to Zen Cruises, a subsidiary of Essel Group. On 12 March 2019, she was delivered to the newly-formed Jalesh Cruises before she received a six-week renovation to suit her Indian clientele. On 19 April 2019, Pacific Jewel was renamed Karnika at her naming ceremony held at the Princess Dock of the Mumbai Port Trust, where she was christened by Shreyasi Punit Goenka, daughter-in-law of Essel and Zee TV chairman, Subhash Chandra. Karnika was initially scheduled to homeport in Mumbai, operating cruises along the Indian coast, and in Dubai in summer 2019, before returning to Mumbai. Jalesh Cruises suspended all operations because of the COVID-19 pandemic. NKD Maritime bought her for US$11.65 million. Karnika was beached in Alang for scrap in November 2020. Scrapping of Karnika started on 9 March 2021. On 1 July 2021, scrapping also started from her stern.
