= TSS Fairstar =

Australian cruise ship (1955–1997)

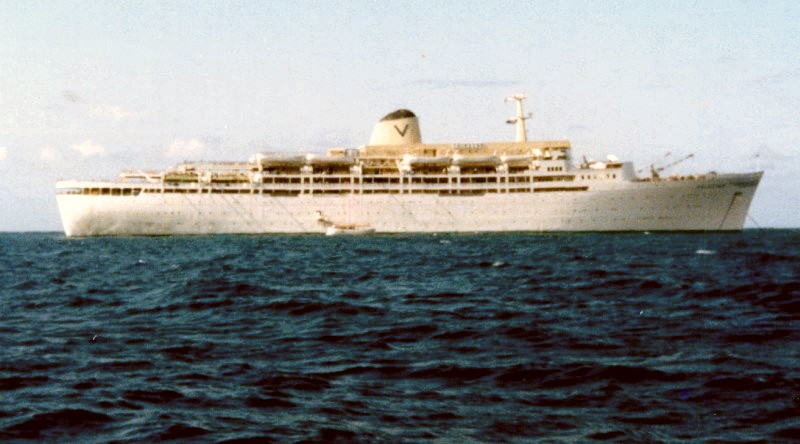
- TSS Fairstar

History

United Kingdom
- Name: Oxfordshire
- Owner: Bibby Line
- Route: Various
- Builder: Fairfield Shipbuilding and Engineering Company, Govan
- Laid down: 1955
- Launched: 15 December 1955
- Maiden voyage: 28 February 1957
- In service: 1957
- Out of service: 1962
- Renamed: Fairstar, 1964
- Refit: 1963–1964 (from Troopship to Liner)
- Name: Fairstar
- Owner: SITMAR (1964-1988), P&O (1989-1997)
- Port of registry: Monrovia, Liberia
- Route: UK-Australia Liner run, South Pacific, New Zealand, Asia
- Maiden voyage: 19 May 1964
- In service: 1964
- Out of service: 1997
- Identification: IMO number: 5267732; Callsign: 5MXH
- Nickname(s): The Fun Ship
- Fate: Scrapped at Alang, India in 10 April 1997

General characteristics
- Type: Oxfordshire: Troopship; Fairstar: Passenger liner, cruise ship
- Tonnage: Oxfordshire: 20,586 GRT; Fairstar: 21,619 GRT
- Length: 187.76 m (616 ft 0 in)
- Beam: 23.86 m (78 ft 3 in)
- Draught: 8.41 m (27 ft 7 in)
- Decks: 10
- Propulsion: 4 × Pametrada steam turbines manufactured by the shipbuilder, double reduction gears to twin screws, 18,000 shp (13,423 kW)
- Speed: 17 knots (31 km/h; 20 mph)
- Boats & landing craft carried: 16
- Capacity: Oxfordshire: 1,500; Fairstar: 1,868
- Troops: Oxfordshire: 1,000
- Crew: Oxfordshire: 409; Fairstar: 460

TSS (Turbine Steam Ship) Fairstar (Fairstar, the Fun Ship) was an Australian-based cruise ship operating out of Sydney for 22 years. Originally completed in 1957 as the British troopship Oxfordshire, it was converted to become the Fairstar in 1964 for immigrant voyages and from December 1974 was permanently engaged in cruising.

== Background ==
In the early 1950s, the British War Office still regularly required the transportation of troops to and from garrisons in many parts of the Empire. The Ministry of Transport had contracts with several shipping lines to transport the officers, troops and their families. One particular shipping company, The Bibby Line, had a long history of transporting troops; in fact from as early as 1854 during the Crimean War. In 1953, Bibby Line was made an attractive offer by the British Government to build a new vessel for troop transport. A simultaneous arrangement was made with the British-India Steam Navigation Company for an almost identical vessel, which would become Nevasa. These new ships would become the largest and last British vessels built solely for trooping. It was intended that the pair would take up twenty-year charters from the British Government, to secure their employment. Consequently, Bibby Line sold the original 1912 Oxfordshire and plans for the new ship proceeded with the ship to be built at the Fairfield Shipbuilding and Engineering Company of Glasgow. The keel of the new vessel (designated as 'Ship No. 755') was laid down with 8,396 tons (8 531 t) of steel assigned for the construction. On 15 December 1955 the Oxfordshire was launched by Lady Dorothea Head, wife of the Minister for War, Lord Head. Fitting out of the ship took over a year, with her sea trials commencing on 29 January 1957.

The Oxfordshire was officially handed over to the Bibby Line on 14 February 1957 when she steamed towards Liverpool to commence her trooping role. On 28 February 1957 Oxfordshire left Liverpool on her maiden voyage bound for Hong Kong via Cape Town. The vessel had the capacity to carry 1000 troops, 500 passengers (usually the families of the troops) and 409 crew members. Oxfordshire made an average of four trips per year between Britain and the Far East, calling en route at Ceylon, Aden, Port Said and Suez in Egypt. However, by the early 1960s the use of aircraft to fulfil transport requirements and the declining number of overseas British garrisons meant that trooping by sea was soon to be redundant. In 1962 the British Government finally decided to rely entirely on air trooping, so the long-term charters of Oxfordshire and near sister-ship Nevasa were terminated and the vessels withdrawn from service. The last active troopship Oxfordshire followed Nevasa (despatched in October 1962), to lay up in the safe haven of Cornwall's River Fal in December of that year.

It was at this time that the migrant trade to Australia was booming. British and European migrants were given assisted passage to Australia – only having to pay ten pounds, with the balance paid by the Federal Government. The Vlasov Group passenger division, SITMAR Line, was already well established as a migrant carrier to Australia and they quickly showed an interest in the idle Oxfordshire. A six-year charter agreement with an option to purchase the ship was signed in February 1963 between the Bibby Line and Fairstar Shipping Corporation (another subsidiary of Vlasov Group).

== 'ConOx' ==
The complex plan to convert the Oxfordshire into a ship that was suitable for both liner voyages and cruises was one of the most ambitious projects to be overseen by the Vlasov engineers. On 19 May 1963 the Oxfordshire entered the Wilton-Fijenoord shipyard at Schiedam to commence the transformation. The project was known as the "Conox Project" (Conversion of Oxfordshire). Unfortunately, the project took longer than expected and cost more than anticipated (£4.5 million). In May 1964 it was then decided to buy the ship outright and move her to Southampton to complete the fitting out. The handsome, new-look ship was quite changed from her former image: the superstructure was lengthened both fore and aft, three pairs of cargo booms were replaced by cranes, also the signal mast and funnel housing were redesigned. Internally, the vessel was completely transformed, with contemporary 'One Class Tourist' accommodation for a maximum of 1,868 passengers in 488 cabins, all but 68 of which were equipped with private shower and toilet facilities.

== Fairstar ==
On 19 May 1964 the Fairstar left Southampton with a full complement of passengers, mostly migrants, on her maiden voyage to Sydney, Australia, joining older company vessels Fairsky, Fairsea and Castel Felice already operating in the same role. During the low season of the migrant run, SITMAR used the ships for cruises out of Sydney to the South Pacific. Fairstar's first such cruise departed on 6 January 1965 under charter to Massey Ferguson for their annual convention. After almost another full year of liner voyages from the UK to Australia, Fairstar sailed on another cruise from Sydney, departing on 22 December 1965 and visiting Nouméa and Suva. SITMAR lost its migrant carrying contract to Chandris Lines in 1970, Fairsea having been withdrawn in 1969 following a disabling engine-room fire mid-Pacific. Castel Felice also went to the breakers in October 1970, after a career of almost 40 years. Fairsky was laid up in Southampton in February 1972, not returning to the Australian service until November 1973.

Fairstar was used more and more for cruising over the following years and in November 1974, the vessel departed Southampton for her last liner voyage. Fairstar then began cruising as a permanent cruise ship from Australia in December 1974. Most of the cruises were to the South Pacific; however, she often made annual trips to Asia where the vessel would be dry-docked in Singapore for routine maintenance and upgrades in between cruises. Fairstar thus joined Fairsky in full-time cruising, Fairsky having finally been withdrawn in July 1974 from the now unsubsidised UK-Australia route. Both ships remained in service together for a further three years, until the sudden unfortunate demise of Fairsky in June 1977, after the vessel struck a submerged wreck near Jakarta, Indonesia and was found to be beyond economic repair.

Several upgrades were made to Fairstar during her career, the most notable occurring in April 1989, not long after SITMAR was sold to P&O Australia for $210 million. During the refit, her boat deck was extended, lounges and passenger cabins were upgraded and a new potable water plant installed. The passenger capacity was also reduced to 1,280. The funnel sported a new colour scheme: a blue swan on a white funnel (it was originally changed to a white swan on a blue logo in July 1988).

== The end of Fairstar ==
During the 1990s, Fairstar suffered an increasing number of breakdowns and problems. New SOLAS (Safety Of Life At Sea) requirements that were to be introduced in 1997 meant that Fairstar would require extensive upgrading which would cost millions of dollars. In late 1996, the managing director of P&O, Mr Phil Young, announced that Fairstar's long career would conclude the following year. When the news was broken to the public, the final cruise was sold out in a few hours. On 21 January 1997, Fairstar sailed on her last ever cruise, visiting Amédée Island, Nouméa, Lifou, Vila and Havannah-Boulari Passage before finally returning to Sydney. On her return to Sydney, she had the traditional long white pennant flying from her mainmast.

The name "RIPA" was then roughly painted on her bow (which many believe stood for "Rest In Peace Always") and she flew the Saint Vincent and the Grenadines flag. Soon after, she slipped out of Sydney Harbour and arrived at Alang, India on 10 April 1997 where she was broken up for scrap.

== See also ==
- Fairsky
- List of cruise ships
- Cruise ships
- List of ocean liners
- Ocean liners
- Troopship
