= MV Sirdhana =

British passenger ship

History

United Kingdom
- Name: Sirdhana
- Namesake: Sirdhana
- Owner: British India SN Co
- Operator: 1971: P&O General Cargo Division
- Port of registry: London
- Route: 1948: Calcutta – Yokohama; 1962: Bombay – Basra
- Builder: Swan, Hunter & W Richardson, Low Walker
- Cost: £1,116,000
- Yard number: 1826
- Launched: 8 January 1947
- Completed: 9 December 1947
- Refit: 1955
- Identification: UK official number 181791; call sign GCLD
- Fate: Scrapped, 1972

General characteristics
- Class & type: "S" class passenger ship
- Tonnage: 8,608 GRT, 5,057 NRT, 8,827 DWT
- Length: 479.3 ft (146.1 m) overall; 459.0 ft (139.9 m) registered
- Beam: 62.7 ft (19.1 m)
- Draught: 26 ft 4 in (8.03 m)
- Depth: 31.3 ft (9.5 m)
- Decks: 2
- Installed power: 5,900 bhp (4,400 kW)
- Propulsion: 2 × 2-stroke diesel engines; 2 × screws
- Speed: 15 knots (28 km/h)
- Capacity: cargo: 410,075 cubic feet (11,612 m^{3}), including 11,245 cubic feet (318 m^{3}) insulated; passengers: 1947: 21 1st class, 70 2nd class, 2,355 deck class; 1955: 21 1st class, 32 2nd class, 30 intermediate class, 333 bunked class, 987 deck class
- Sensors & processing systems: as built: wireless direction finding, echo sounding device; by 1958: radar
- Notes: sister ships: Sangola, Santhia

MV Sirdhana was a motor ship that was launched in England in 1947, worked regular routes in the Indian Ocean and the Far East, and was scrapped in Taiwan in 1972. She was one of three ships of the British India Steam Navigation Company (BI) post-war "S" class.

This was the third BI ship to be called Sirdhana, after the town of Sirdhana, near Meerut in Uttar Pradesh. The first was a barquentine-rigged steamship that was built in 1879 and scrapped in 1911. The second was a steamship that was built in 1925 and sunk in 1939.

== Building ==
One of BI's scheduled passenger and cargo routes was between Calcutta and Yokohama. Its regular ports of call were Rangoon (now Yangon), Penang, Singapore, Hong Kong, and Kobe. It was called the "Apcar Route", as it was founded by Apcar and Company, which BI had taken over in 1912.

In 1947 BI took delivery of a pair of new S-class passenger-cargo liners for this route. Barclay, Curle and Company at Whiteinch, Glasgow built Sangola, launching her on 23 December 1946 and delivering her on 6 June 1947. Swan, Hunter & Wigham Richardson at Low Walker built her sister ship Sirdhana, launching her on 8 January and delivering her on 9 December. In 1950 a third sister joined them, when Barclay, Curle launched Santhia on 1 June and completed her on 3 November.

Swan, Hunter built Sirdhana at Low Walker on the River Tyne as yard number 1826. She cost £1,116,000. Her lengths were 479.3 ft (146.1 m) overall and 459.0 ft (139.9 m) registered. Her beam was 62.7 ft (19.1 m), her depth was 31.3 ft (9.5 m) and her draught was 26 ft 4 in (8.03 m). Sirdhana's holds had capacity for 410,075 cubic feet (11,612 m^{3}) of cargo, including 11,245 cubic feet (318 m^{3}) insulated. Her tonnages were 8,608 GRT, 5,057 NRT, and 8,827 DWT. She had berths for 21 passengers in first class and 70 in second class, and was licensed to carry 2,355 unberthed passengers on deck.

Sirdhana had twin screws, each driven by a Doxford single-acting four-cylinder two-stroke diesel engine. Between them her twin engines developed 5,900 bhp (4,400 kW). She made 15 knots (28 km/h) on her sea trials, and could cruise at 14 knots (26 km/h). As built, Sirdhana's navigation equipment included wireless direction finding, and an echo sounding device. By 1958 it also included radar.

BI registered Sirdhana at London. Her UK official number was 181791 and her call sign was GCLD.

== Career ==
In 1948 Sirdhana entered service, joining Sangola on the "Apcar Route". They were joined by Santhia in 1950.

In 1955 Sirdhana's passenger accommodation was refitted. The number of first class berths remained the same, but second class was reduced to 32 berths, and a new intermediate class with 30 berths was created. Her unberthed deck class capacity was reduced to 987, and a new bunked class was created with 333 berths. Until 1955, Sirdhana's hull had been black with a white waistline. In the refit, it was repainted white with a black waistline.

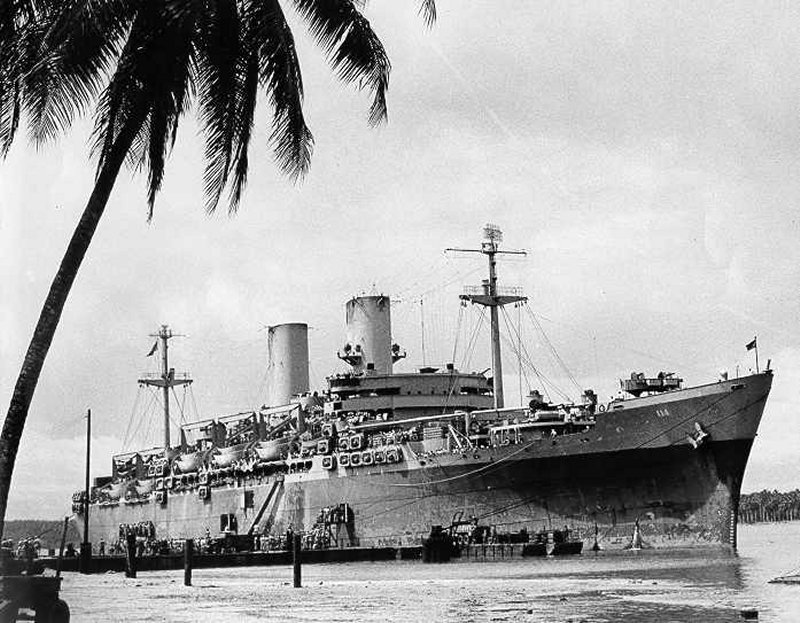
USS General William Mitchell collided with Sirdhana in 1960

On 26 November 1960 the troopship USS General William Mitchell accidentally rammed Sirdhana amidships at the inner breakwater in the Port of Yokohama. There were no casualties, but Sirdhana's side was gashed amidships, from her boat deck down to her waterline. Sirdhana spent the next five months in Yokohama getting repaired. She returned to service in May 1961.

Trade on the "Apcar Route" was declining. In 1962 BI transferred Sangola and Sirdhana to its route between Bombay and Basra, which was still busy carrying migrant workers between the Indian subcontinent and the Persian Gulf. In April 1961 this route had lost one of its ships, when Dara suffered an explosion, burnt out, and sank off Dubai. The regular ports of call on this route were Karachi, Pasni, Gwadur, Muscat, Bandar Abbas, Sharjah, Dubai, Umm Said, Bahrain, Bushehr, Kuwait, Abadan, and Khorramshahr.

On 19 November 1970 Sirdhana was the first ship the enter the new deep water harbour at Port Rashid in Dubai. When she joined the route in 1961, Dubai had no port deep enough for BI's ships to dock alongside a quay. They used to anchor offshore, and tenders transferred passengers and officials between the ships and the shore.

On 1 October 1971 the General Cargo Division of BI's parent company P&O was appointed to manage Sirdhana. In 1972 she made three voyages to East Africa, terminating at Dar es Salaam in Tanzania.

On 3 August 1972 BI sold Sirdhana for scrap to Nan Feng Steel Enterprise Co Ltd in Kaohsiung, Taiwan. Demolition started on 16 August, and was completed on 2 October.

== Bibliography ==
- Abraham, PJ (1963). Last Hours on Dara. London: Peter Davies.
- Haws, Duncan (1987). British India S.N. Co. Merchant Fleets. Vol. 11. Burwash: Travel Creatours Ltd Publications. ISBN 0-946378-07-X.
- Laxon, William A.; Perry, F. W. (1994). B.I. - The British India Steam Navigation Company Limited. Kendal: World Ship Society. ISBN 0-905617-65-7.
- Lloyd's Register of Shipping. Vol. II. M–Z. London: Lloyd's Register of Shipping. 1948 – via Internet Archive.
- Register Book. Vol. I Register of Ships. London: Lloyd's Register of Shipping. 1958 – via Internet Archive.
