= MV Dwarka =

British passenger & cargo liner that traded in the Indian Ocean

History

United Kingdom
- Name: Dwarka
- Namesake: Dwarka
- Owner: 1947: British India SN Co; 1973: P&O; 1975: British India SN Co
- Port of registry: London
- Route: Bombay – Persian Gulf
- Builder: Swan, Hunter & Wigham Richardson, Low Walker
- Yard number: 1828
- Launched: 25 October 1946
- Completed: 25 June 1947
- Out of service: 1982
- Identification: UK official number 181650; IMO number: 5095270; call sign GCKS
- Fate: Scrapped 1983

General characteristics
- Class & type: D-class passenger and cargo ship
- Tonnage: 4,851 GRT, 2,672 NRT, 4,525 DWT
- Length: 398.6 ft (121.5 m) overall; 382.3 ft (116.5 m) registered
- Beam: 54.8 ft (16.7 m)
- Draught: 21 ft 11 in (6.68 m)
- Depth: 23.6 ft (7.2 m)
- Decks: 2
- Installed power: 894 NHP, 4,200 bhp
- Propulsion: 1 × 5-cylinder 2-stroke diesel engine; 1 × screw
- Speed: 13 1/2 knots (25 km/h)
- Capacity: 212,384 cu ft (6,014 m^{3}) cargo; 1947: 1,591 passengers: 13 1st class; 41 2nd class; 1,537 deck class; 1979: 1,119 passengers: 52 cabin class; 534 berthed; 533 deck
- Crew: 122
- Sensors & processing systems: as built: wireless direction finding, echo sounding device; by 1959: radar
- Notes: sister ships: Dumra, Dara, Daressa

MV Dwarka was a British India Steam Navigation Company passenger and cargo ship that operated between the Indian subcontinent and Persian Gulf. She was in service from 1947 until 1982. She was the second of four "modern D Class" sister ships built between 1946 and 1950, and the only one of the four to be built by Swan, Hunter & Wigham Richardson at Low Walker.

She was the third BI ship to be named after Dwarka, an ancient city of religious significance in the state of Gujarat, on India's northwest coast. The first was a steamship that was built in 1894 and scrapped in 1920. The second was a motor ship that was built in 1922 and scrapped in 1937.

== Building ==
Swan, Hunter built the ship at Low Walker as yard number 1828. Mrs GF Hotblack, the wife of one of BI's Directors, launched her on 25 October 1946. Swan, Hunter completed the ship on 25 June 1947. The ship's lengths were 398.6 ft (121.5 m) overall and 382.3 ft (116.5 m) registered. Her beam was 54.8 ft (16.7 m), her depth was 23.6 ft (7.2 m), and her depth was 21 ft 11 in (6.68 m). Her tonnages were 4,851 GRT, 2,672 NRT, and 4,525 DWT.

She had a single screw, driven by a Doxford five-cylinder opposed piston two-stroke diesel engine. It was rated at 894 NHP or 4,200 bhp, and gave her a speed of 13 1/2 knots (25 km/h). Her navigation equipment included wireless direction finding, and an echo sounding device. By 1959 it also included radar.

BI registered Dwarka in London. Her UK official number was 181650 and her call sign was GCKS.

Dwarka's cargo capacity was 212,384 cubic feet (6,014 m^{3}). As built, she had capacity for 1,591 passengers: 13 first class, 41 second class and 1,537 deck class. She had a crew of 122. She and her sisters were described as "ships of transport, cargo plus passengers – comfortable but not luxurious, dependable but not speedy – appropriately functional for their time".

== Career ==
Dwarka entered service in June 1947, joining Dumra on BI's route between Bombay (now Mumbai) and the Persian Gulf. When Dara was completed in June 1948, she joined them on the same route. The fourth sister, Daressa, joined the same route when she was completed in June 1950.

On 20 September 1953, there was a dispute among some of the deck passengers about the price of food. Two Somalian deck passengers killed three crewmen, and injured 11, before they were restrained.

On 12 December 1959 Dwarka left Muscat for Bombay. A few hours later a bomb exploded under a bed in one of her passenger cabins. The target was the Minister of the Interior of Muscat and Oman, Sayed Ahmed bin Ibrahim. The cabin caught fire, and the minister suffered burns and severe shock. The resident Royal Navy officer in Bahrain, Commander Roger Fisher, was also aboard, and rescued bin Ibrahim from the cabin. The minister was taken ashore and admitted to the US mission hospital at Muttrah.

On 19 June 1961 Dwarka was leaving Muscat when there was an explosion in her number one hold, injuring one person. Damage was minor, and the ship continued her voyage to Karachi.

During the Indo-Pakistani war of 1965, Dwarka met another BI motor ship, Santhia, in Muscat to exchange passengers. Dwarka's Indian passengers were transferred to Santhia, and Santhia's Pakistani passengers were transferred to Dwarka. Omani police and the frigate HMS Nubian supervised the exchange.

In 1971 Dwarka joined the General Cargo Division of BI's parent company P&O. Ownership of Dwarka was transferred to P&O on 19 April 1973, but transferred back to BI on 30 May 1975.

In 1979 Dwarka was refitted in Singapore. Her holds were fitted with refrigeration plant, and her passenger accommodation was revised to 52 cabin class, 534 berthed, and 533 deck passengers.

Toward the end of her career, Dwarka, under the command of Captain GA Hankin, featured in two films. In 1979 the BBC made a television documentary as part of the series The World About Us called "Dwarka: An Arabian Voyage". It documented a voyage from Mumbai, calling at Karachi, taking migrant workers to countries in the Persian Gulf. This illustrated the ship's unique historic status, and reportedly prompted renewed interest in her from around the world. In 1981 Richard Attenborough's biographical film Gandhi used Dwarka for several location shoots in Mumbai, portraying much earlier BI ships.

Dwarka was the last survivor of the four D-class ships. Dara had caught fire and sunk in 1961, Daressa was scrapped in 1974, and Dumra was scrapped in 1979.

On 15 May 1982 Dwarka reached Mumbai at the end of her final voyage, and sailed on to reach Karachi on 23 May 1982 where she was delivered to Zulfiqar Metals of Pakistan which had bought her for scrap. She was broken up at Gadani Beach, Pakistan, beginning on 13 June 1982.

Dwarka was the last BI ship to operate traditional liner service. However, the last passenger ship in BI livery was Uganda, which was transferred to P&O's Passenger Division in 1972 but remained in BI colours. Uganda was laid up in April 1985 and sold for scrap in 1986.

== Bibliography ==
- Abraham, PJ (1963). Last Hours on Dara. London: Peter Davies.
- Haws, Duncan (1987). British India S.N. Co. Merchant Fleets. Vol. 11. Burwash: Travel Creatours Ltd Publications. ISBN 0-946378-07-X.
- Laxon, William A.; Perry, F. W. (1994). B.I: The British India Steam Navigation Company Limited. Kendal: World Ship Society. pp. 182−183. ISBN 0-905617-65-7.
- Lloyd's Register of Shipping. Vol. I. A–L. London: Lloyd's Register of Shipping. 1948 – via Internet Archive.
- Miller, William H (1986). The Last Blue Water Liners. London: Conway Maritime Press. ISBN 0-85177-400-8.
- Register Book. Vol. I Register of Ships. London: Lloyd's Register of Shipping. 1959 – via Internet Archive.
