= Fairsky =

Passenger ship

- Fairsky leaving Brisbane, January 1966

History
- Name: SS Steel Artisan (1941); USS Barnes (1942); HMS Attacker (1942–1945); Castel Forte (1950–1958); Fairsky (1958–1977)
- Port of registry: Panama Panama 1958-1968 Monrovia Liberia 1968-1977
- Builder: Western Pipe and Steel Company, San Francisco
- Laid down: 17 April 1941 (as a C3 Cargo Ship)
- Launched: 27 September 1942
- Identification: IMO number: 5111622
- Fate: Scrapped, 24 May 1980

General characteristics
- Tonnage: 12,464 GRT
- Length: 153 m (502 ft 0 in)
- Beam: 21.2 m (69 ft 7 in)
- Propulsion: Single screw
- Speed: 17.5 knots (32.4 km/h; 20.1 mph)
- Capacity: 1,461 one-class passengers

The Turbine Steamship Fairsky was a one-class Italian-styled passenger ship operated by the Sitmar Line, best known for service on the migrant passenger route from Britain to Australia from May 1958 until February 1972. After a 20-month lay-up at Southampton, Fairsky completed two further voyages to Australia, before returning to be based at Sydney as a popular full-time cruise ship, until striking an unmarked wreck in 1977 which rendered the vessel uneconomic to permanently repair. The ship was finally sold to a Philippines based consortium, intended for static use as a casino and floating hotel. In 1979 during refurbishment at Manila Bay for her new role, a fire broke out onboard which destroyed the accommodation. The wreck was towed to Hong Kong for demolition in 1980.

== Prior service ==
Fairsky was laid down in 1941 as a C3 cargo ship named Steel Artisan, but with the entry of the United States into the Second World War, she was requisitioned by the U.S. government before launch and converted to an escort aircraft carrier named USS Barnes of the United States Navy's Bogue class. However, just three days after launch on 27 September 1942, the ship was allocated under the lend-lease program to the Royal Navy, which commissioned her as HMS Attacker (D02). Attacker saw extensive wartime service – initially in convoy escort duties and after further conversion by the Royal Navy in October 1943 – as an assault carrier for the remainder of the war. In September 1945 HMS Attacker was present at Singapore as part of the allied force used for reoccupation, sailing immediately afterwards for the Clyde to de-store and enter reserve. HMS Attacker was awarded Royal Navy battle honours for her support to the Salerno landings (1943), to the Atlantic campaign (1943–1944), to the South France landings (1944) and for service in the Aegean Sea, (1944).

The vessel was returned to the custody of the United States Navy at Norfolk, Virginia in December 1945 and was struck from the U.S. Navy list in February 1946. The ship was next sold to the U.S. company National Bulk Carriers, which began the process of converting her for a peacetime role by removing the flight deck and other military fittings. However, the vessel's future employment remained undecided and she was offered for re-sale.

== Conversion to ocean liner ==
In 1950 the ship was bought by the former Russian emigre shipowner, Alexander Vlasov. Laid up for another two years, in 1952 she was renamed Castel Forte and sent to the Newport News shipyard in the United States, intended for conversion to a refrigerated cargo ship for Vlasov's Italian-managed Sitmar Line. However, this conversion was soon abandoned and the vessel returned to lay-up. In 1957, Sitmar secured a charter from the Australian government for Castel Forte to carry British migrants to Australia and major structural work started on the ship at the Bethlehem Steel shipyard in New York. The vessel was moved to Genoa in December 1957, where the interior refitting was completed in May 1958. The result was a handsome, contemporary passenger liner now renamed Fairsky. Tourist one class accommodation for a maximum of 1,461 was provided in 461 cabins over five decks. Reflecting similar arrangements in earlier company ships Fairsea and Castel Felice, Fairsky featured just seven cabins with private facilities, located forward on the Sun Deck, beneath the Bridge Deck. Air-conditioning was installed throughout the ship and a good range of comfortable public rooms was provided, mostly on the Boat Deck. Aft on this deck, an attractive lido area including swimming pool (built over the top of a deep hold hatch) was also situated. Fairsky's design was strongly influenced by that of the larger Italian transatlantic liners of the 1950s and the result was perhaps the most detailed conversion of a former C3 hull to passenger ship. On 26 June 1958 the vessel commenced service from Southampton under the command of Sitmar's senior Master, Captain Jorge Petrescu. Fairsky was registered in Panama under the nominal ownership of the Fairline Shipping Corporation, though remained operated by Sitmar while in Vlasov ownership. The port of registry was later changed to that of Monrovia, Liberia.

== The migrant contract ==
Fairsky thus joined the Fairsea (formerly another wartime escort carrier USS Charger (CVE-30)) and Castel Felice (originally the British-India Steam Navigation Company's Kenya of 1931), plying the migrant route between Europe and Australia. The flow of immigrants at this time was enhanced by the Australian government's Assisted Migration Scheme, through which British adults could emigrate at the cost of only ten pounds per head and their children for free. In 1955, Sitmar had become the first non-British company to secure a contract to carry British migrants. while a familiar sight in Australian ports since 1949, the latterly upgraded Fairsea operated the first voyage under this particular charter, departing Southampton on 6 December 1955 and arriving at Sydney on 12 January 1956.

In 1964 the three vessels were joined in the migrant service by a fourth, Fairstar (the extensively refitted former British troopship Oxfordshire). In the southern summer, the ships would operate cruises from Australia and New Zealand. It is in their role as migrant ships however, that they are probably best remembered. Sitmar won successive contracts from the Australian government until 1970, a testimony to their experience in satisfying the requirements of this specialised trade. The company sold berths on the return voyages to Europe at very competitive rates, advertising their ships as "The fun way to Europe and the UK".

While precise figures are not available, the four ships were responsible for the transportation of hundreds of thousands of European settlers to Australia, spanning over 20 years in total. Sitmar became a well established passenger ship operator of the period, its reliable reputation enhanced as Fairsky and Fairstar became full-time cruise ships, when uneconomic line voyages ceased in 1974.

=== Life on board ===
Fairsky was well designed for long voyages, with five open, teak-clad upper decks including a deep swimming pool aft, courts marked for deck tennis and quoits. The ship featured three dining rooms (two sittings were provided), a grand social hall, children's playroom, a writing room and library, Bavarian tavern and two further bars, also a cinema. Medical facilities included a fully equipped hospital with operating theatre and isolation ward.

One of the guest bands which played on the ship was The Seekers while on their way to the UK to begin their career and the pop music group, the Bee Gees, their parents Hugh and Barbara Gibb, and Ossie Byrne set sail from Australia in Fairsky on January 3, 1967, landing in Southampton on February 6. The three brothers performed on board in return for their passage.

The first female Prime Minister of Australia (2010–2013), Julia Gillard and her family migrated to South Australia from Southampton, UK, arriving at Adelaide, South Australia aboard Fairsky, in 1966. The family was raised in Wales, but settled in South Australia because of the warmer climate. Gillard's successor as leader of the Australian Labor Party, Anthony Albanese, also has a connection to the ship as his parents first met aboard the Fairsky on a voyage from Sydney to Southampton in March 1962 (his father was a Sitmar Line steward).

=== Routes ===
The ship travelled through the Suez Canal and stopped at the Yemeni port of Aden. The ship would first berth at Fremantle, Western Australia, then steam through the Great Australian Bight to Melbourne, Victoria and finally onto Sydney, New South Wales, dropping passengers off at each point. Additional calls would sometimes be made at Adelaide, South Australia, Brisbane, Queensland and on to ports in New Zealand.

Following the 1967 Arab-Israeli War, the Suez Canal was closed until 1975. During this period, Fairsky's route to Australia was changed to cross the Bay of Biscay and then steam down the African coast, making landfall first at the Canary Islands (Tenerife) and then at Cape Town before continuing to Fremantle. Passengers were able to alight at each port and these calls were often overnight.

An alternative route sometimes used by Fairsky was to cross the Atlantic Ocean with a stop at the island of Madeira, then on to the Panama Canal via Curaçao. Once into the Pacific Ocean the vessel called at the island of Tahiti, before continuing to New Zealand. Here the ship called at Wellington, before the vessel crossed the Tasman Sea to Sydney.

== Later career and demise ==
In 1970 Sitmar lost the migrant contract to Chandris Lines and Sitmar was forced to seek new markets for its two remaining liners (Fairsea had been disabled by an engine-room fire mid-Pacific in 1969 and sold to shipbreakers, while Castel Felice was also sold for scrapping in October 1970). Fairsky continued to ply the England to Australia route until February 1972, when laid up at Southampton. Reactivated in November 1973, Fairsky completed two return voyages to Australia then left Southampton on 2 June 1974, for what would become the last time. Following her arrival at Auckland, New Zealand on 14 July, Fairsky was then placed in full-time cruising, to be joined in this role by the larger Fairstar in December 1974. Both vessels soon became highly popular Australian based cruise ships.

Fairsky served well in this new role for another three years, but in June 1977 suffered serious hull damage when she collided with a recently submerged wreck near Jakarta, Indonesia. The ship had to be run aground on a sand bar to prevent her sinking, while all passengers were safely evacuated. Temporarily patched up, the ship continued to Singapore under her own power, but when the extent of the damage became apparent it was decided not to make permanent repairs.

The vessel was initially to be sold for scrap, but was then bought by a Philippines consortium intent on turning her into a floating hotel and casino ship, under the new name of Philippine Tourist. However, before the conversion in Manila Bay was completed, the vessel was gutted by a fire on 3 November 1979. The wreck was finally sold for demolition, arriving in Hong Kong under tow on 27 May 1980, bringing to a sudden end a long, varied and otherwise highly successful career.

== See also ==
- Fairstar
- List of cruise ships
- Cruise ships
- List of ocean liners
- Ocean liners

== Bibliography ==
- Eliseo, Maurizio (1998). The Sitmar Liners and the V Ships. London, UK: Carmania Press. ISBN 0-9534291-0-5.
- Goldberg, Mark H (1992). Caviar & Cargo - The C3 Passenger Ships. North American Maritime Books. ISBN 978-1-879180-01-7.
- Hobbs, David (Cdr, MBE, Royal Navy)(2003). Royal Navy Escort Carriers. Liskeard, UK: Maritime Books.
- Plowman, Peter (2004). The Sitmar Liners Past and Present. Sydney, NSW: Rosenberg. ISBN 1-877058-25-4.
