= USS General William Mitchell =

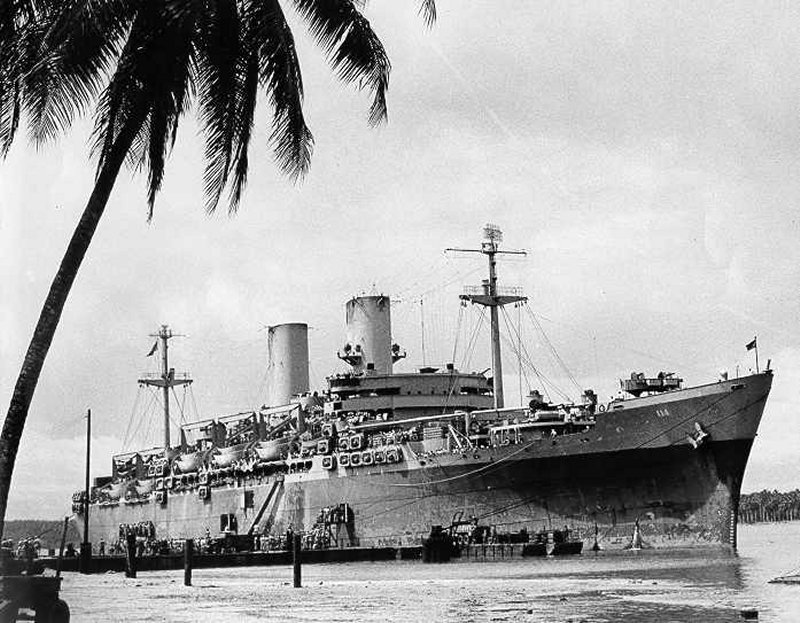
- USS General William Mitchell (AP-114) embarking units of the 1st Marine Division at Pavuvu, Russell Islands, November 1944

History

United States
- Name: USS General William Mitchell
- Namesake: General William "Billy" Mitchell (1879–1936), proponent of an independent air force
- Builder: Federal Shipbuilding & Drydock
- Launched: 31 October 1943
- Sponsored by: Mrs William Mitchell, widow of General Mitchell
- Acquired: 15 January 1944
- Commissioned: 19 January 1944
- Decommissioned: 1966
- Reclassified: AP-114
- Identification: MC hull type P2-S2-R2, MC hull no. 672
- Honors and awards: Four service stars for the Korean War
- Fate: Scrapped in Taiwan, 1988

General characteristics
- Class & type: General John Pope-class transport
- Type: troopship
- Displacement: 11,450 tons (lt); 20,175 tons fully laden
- Length: 622 feet 7 inches (189.76 m)
- Beam: 75 feet 6 inches (23.01 m)
- Draft: 25 feet 6 inches (7.77 m)
- Installed power: 17,000 shp
- Propulsion: 2 steam turbines, reduction gearing, twin screw
- Speed: 20.6 knots (38.2 km/h)
- Capacity: 5,289
- Complement: 452
- Armament: 4 x single 5"/38 caliber dual purpose guns, 4 x quad 1.1" guns, 20 x single 20mm guns

USS General William Mitchell (AP-114) was a troopship that served with the United States Navy in World War II, the Korean War and the Vietnam War.

General William Mitchell was launched 31 October 1943 under a Maritime Commission contract by the Federal Shipbuilding & Drydock Company of Kearny, New Jersey; acquired 15 January 1944 and commissioned four days later.

== World War II ==
From 3 March to 20 August 1944 General William Mitchell made five round trip transport voyages out of Norfolk, Virginia and New York to Casablanca and Liverpool, carrying fighting men to the North African Theater and participating in the buildup prior to the Allied invasion of Northern France. On the return leg of these frequent voyages, she carried casualties and rotation troops home to the United States, ensuring a steady flow of men and equipment between America and war-torn Europe.

During the autumn of 1944 and through the spring of 1945, General William Mitchell called twice at Bombay, India, as she redeployed and rotated troops in the China-Burma-India theater. On the first of these voyages she sailed from New York via Panama and Australia, putting in at Bombay 7 October and embarking veterans for passage to Australia and America, and finally mooring at San Diego, California 17 November 1944. Her second passage to India took her from San Pedro via Tasmania to embark Allied troops and Italian prisoners of war at Bombay; she off-loaded the POW's at Melbourne; loaded dependent wives and children in New Zealand and returned to San Pedro 3 March 1945.

The ship then brought troops from San Francisco to Espiritu Santo, Guadalcanal, Manus, and Leyte as the European war neared conclusion and the Pacific Theater gained priority, General William Mitchell sailed to Livorno and Naples, Italy, to transport troops and redeploy them for the anticipated assault on Japan's homeland. These troops debarked at Ulithi and the Philippines in the summer of 1945, and the ship returned to San Francisco 6 December 1945 at war's end filled with homeward-bound warriors.

As part of the Magic Carpet fleet, the ship carried sailors from San Francisco to the Philippines, returning servicemen from Hollandia to Seattle, and troops from the Philippines and Guam to San Francisco, through the spring of 1946.

== Postwar service ==
From April 1946 until 1949 General William Mitchell sailed from West Coast ports and shuttled troops and supplies to and from Japan, China, Guam, and Hawaii. She underwent alterations for peacetime service at the Philadelphia Navy Yard in March 1947 and then returned to San Francisco and her transpacific schedule.

In October 1949 she was transferred to the Military Sea Transport Service (later known as the Military Sealift Command) and in 1950 continued her West Coast-Orient travels. In that year, too, two round trip voyages from New Orleans and New York were made to Bremerhaven to rotate and supply troops in Europe.

== Korean War ==
The ship departed San Francisco, California 18 June 1951 beginning a round world cruise accumulating a total of 34,311 sea miles. She visited the following ports during this trip: Balboa Canal Zone 26 June 1951, San Juan P.R. 29 June 1951, New Orleans 4 July 1951 (Change of Command), Bremerhaven, Germany 19 July 1951, New York 1 August 1951, Bremerhaven, Germany 12 August 1951, Oran Algeria 17 August 1951, Port Said, Egypt 20 August 1951, Colombo, Ceylon 29 August 1951, Saigon, F-Indo China 4 September 1951, Haiphong, F-IndoChina 6 September 1951, Pusan, Korea 11 September 1951, Kobe, Japan 15 September 1951, San Francisco, Calif 26 September 1951.

General William Mitchell continued to transport men and material from West Coast ports to Japan and Korea, supporting the United Nations forces in the latter country. The ship also transported families of servicemen to these areas as well.

== Final years ==
She continued her service during the early years of the Vietnam War ferrying servicemen to stations in Japan, Korea, Midway, Okinawa, Taiwan, and Guam, the largest staging station for the war. On 26 November 1960, she rammed the British passenger liner Sirdhana at the inner breakwater in the Port of Yokohama, cutting her to the waterline.

Her frequent shuttle runs followed this pattern with the addition of numerous calls at Formosa and Pacific Islands. She also was used to transport military families from Oakland Naval Supply Center to Honolulu (abt 1964) until returned to the Maritime Administration 1 December 1966.

General William Mitchell entered the National Defense Reserve Fleet and was berthed in Suisun Bay, California. She was sold for scrapping on 29 June 1987 for the sum of $1,270,000, and scrapped in Taiwan in 1988.

== Awards ==
General William Mitchell received four service stars for Korean War service.
