= SS Uganda (1952) =

British steamship

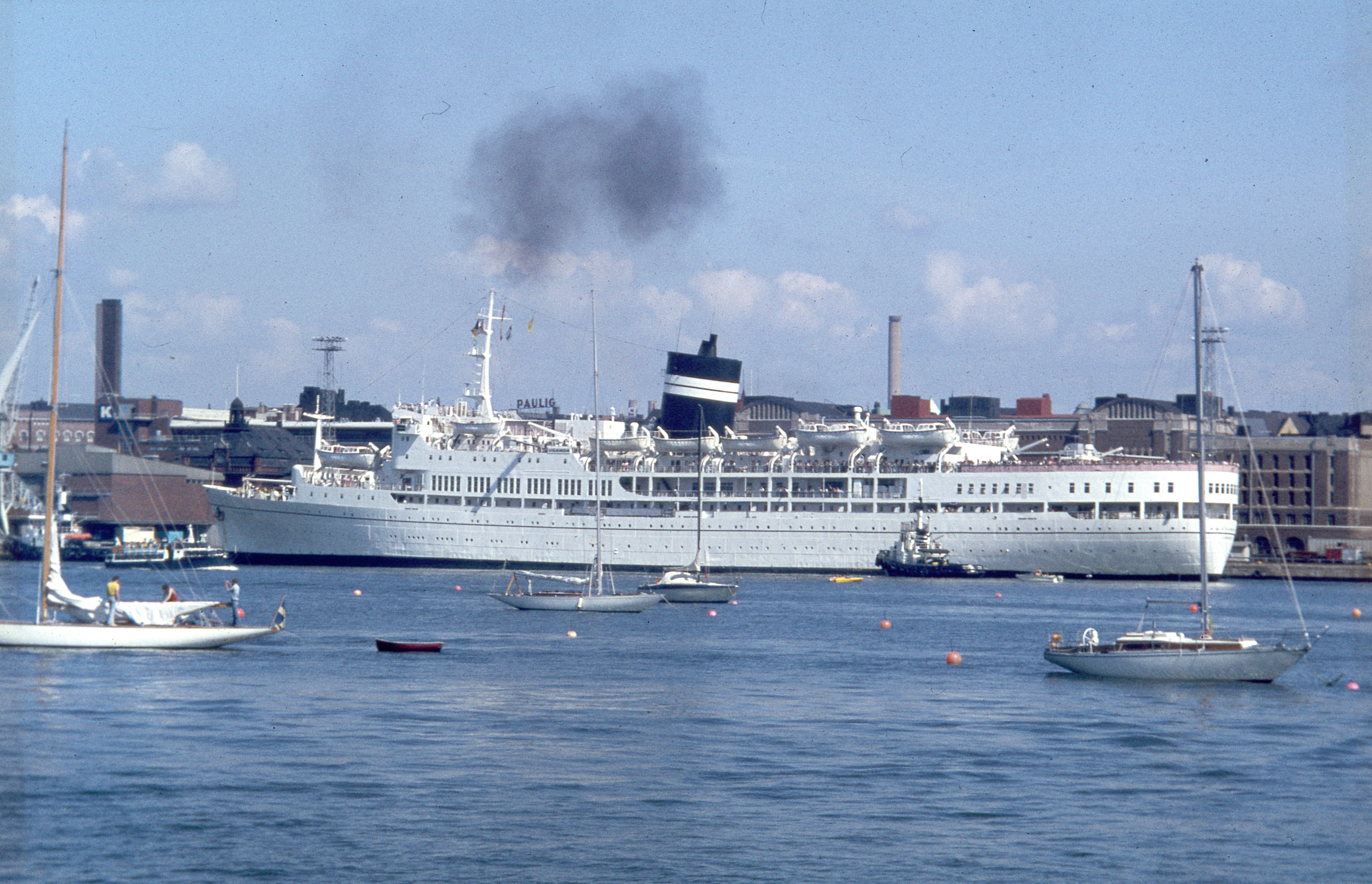
- Uganda in Helsinki's South Harbour in the early 1980s

History

United Kingdom
- Name: Uganda (1952–1986); Triton (1986–1992)
- Namesake: Uganda
- Owner: British-India SN Co (1952–72); P&O (1972–82, 1983)
- Operator: British-India SN Co (1952–71); P&O (1971–82); Royal Navy (1982, 1983–85)
- Port of registry: London
- Route: 1952–67 UK – East Africa; 1968–82 educational cruises
- Builder: Barclay Curle & Co, Glasgow
- Yard number: 720
- Launched: 15 January 1952
- Maiden voyage: 2 August 1952
- Out of service: 25 April 1985
- Identification: UK official number 184658; Call sign GFRQ; IMO number: 5372094
- Honours and awards: Falkland Islands, 1982
- Fate: Scrapped in 1992

General characteristics
- Type: Passenger liner (1952–67); Cruise ship (1968–82); Hospital ship (1982); Troopship (1982); Stores ship (1983–85)
- Tonnage: 1952–67: 14,430 GRT; 8,034 NRT; 9,630 DWT; 1968–82: 16,907 GRT; 8,827 NRT; 5,695 DWT
- Length: 516.7 feet (157.5 m) p/p; 539.8 feet (164.5 m) o/a
- Beam: 71.4 feet (21.8 m)
- Draught: 25 feet 3 1/2 inches (7.709 m)
- Depth: 35.0 feet (10.7 m)
- Installed power: 12,300 shp
- Propulsion: 2 × steam turbines, twin propellers
- Speed: 19.52 knots (36.15 km/h; 22.46 mph) maximum; 16 knots (30 km/h; 18 mph) cruising
- Capacity: 1952–67: 167 first class passengers; 133 tourist class passengers; 388,250 cubic feet (10,994 m^{3}) cargo; 1967–82: 306 cabin berths; 920 dormitory berths
- Crew: 287

SS Uganda was a British steamship that had a varied and notable career. She was built in 1952 as a passenger liner, and successively served as a cruise ship, hospital ship, troop ship and stores ship. She was laid up in 1985 and scrapped in 1992.

== Passenger liner ==
Barclay Curle and Company of Whiteinch, Glasgow built Uganda for the British-India Steam Navigation Company (BI). She was a passenger and cargo liner with capacity for 167 first class and 133 tourist class passengers and 388,250 cubic feet (10,994 m^{3}) of cargo. Her original tonnages were 14,430 GRT, 8,034 NRT and 9,630 DWT. Wallsend Slipway & Engineering Company built her two Parsons steam turbines, which between them developed 12,300 shp.

Uganda was launched on 15 January 1952, completed six months later and made her sea trials on 16 July. On trial she achieved a top speed of 19.52 knots (36.15 km/h), but in service she normally cruised at 16 knots (30 km/h). Her route was between London and East Africa, calling at Gibraltar, Naples, Port Said, Aden, Mombasa, Dar-es-Salaam, Tanga and Beira.

Increasing competition from civil aviation reduced the market for passenger sailings between Britain and East Africa, leading BI to withdraw Uganda from the route in 1967.

== Cruise ship ==
BI commissioned Howaldtswerke-Deutsche Werft of Hamburg to refit Uganda as an educational cruise ship. Decks were inserted in her former cargo holds, which were converted into dormitory cabins with a total of 920 berths. The conversion raised her passenger capacity from 300 to 1,226 and cost £2.8 million. It increased her gross and net tonnages to 16,907 GRT 8,827 NRT but the loss of cargo capacity reduced her deadweight tonnage to 5,695 DWT.

In her new role, Uganda sailed her first voyage on 27 February 1968. On 21 October 1969 while she was cruising in the North Atlantic in international waters off Cape Trafalgar a Spanish shore battery opened fire. Several shells landed within 1/2 nautical mile (1 km) of the ship.

Uganda continued for 14 years cruising mainly in Scandinavia and the Mediterranean, together with her company consort Nevasa. In 1971 Uganda's management and operation were transferred to P&O's Passenger Division. In 1972 P&O absorbed its BI subsidiary and Uganda's ownership. However, uniquely within the P&O fleet, Uganda retained her BI livery of white hull with a black band and black funnel with two white bands. Nevasa was larger and more modern than Uganda but also more expensive to run. In 1974 she was withdrawn and scrapped, leaving Uganda as the fleet's only educational cruise ship.

== Falklands service ==
In 1982 Uganda was a hospital ship in the Falklands War with the call sign of "Mother Hen". She was called up for military duty while on cruise 276 and discharged her 315 cabin passengers and 940 school children, who were on an educational cruise, in Naples. When Uganda docked in Naples, reporters turned up their microphones to hear a ship full of school children singing Rule, Britannia!

Uganda had a three-day refit in Gibraltar where a helicopter platform, fittings for replenishment at sea, satellite communications and wards and operating theatres were installed. Two additional water distillers were fitted on the sports deck. In accordance with the Geneva Convention she was painted white and eight red crosses were painted, two on each side of the hull, one facing forward on the bridge superstructure, one on the upper deck visible from the air, and one on either side of her funnel. A team of 136 medical staff including 12 doctors, operating theatre staff and 40 members of the Queen Alexandra's Royal Naval Nursing Service, left Portsmouth to join her taking large quantities of medical supplies with them.

The survey vessels HMS Hecla, Hydra and Herald were converted to ambulance ships to work with Uganda. She received her first casualties on 12 May: wounded men from the Type 42 destroyer HMS Sheffield. Uganda sailed to and fro between "Red Cross Box 2" – at position 50°50′S 58°40′W and Middle Bay, taking on casualties, both British and Argentine, transferring those who were well enough to the converted survey ships for passage to Montevideo. On 28 May 1982 the land battles started and Uganda anchored in Grantham Sound, 11 miles northwest of Goose Green, where casualties from both sides arrived by helicopter and were treated. By 31 May 1982 she had 132 casualties aboard.

Uganda co-ordinated the movements of the three British and three Argentine ambulance ships Almirante Irízar, Bahía Paraíso and Puerto Deseado. She conducted 504 surgical operations, treated 730 casualties including 150 Argentinians, and made four rendezvous with the Argentine ships. In deference to the TV series M*A*S*H she was nicknamed NOSH – Naval Ocean-going Surgical Hospital.

By 10 July 1982 her role as a hospital ship was over and the crew held a party for 92 Falkland children more in keeping with her peacetime role. On 13 July 1982 Uganda was deregistered as a hospital ship and the red crosses were painted out. Two days later she went back to Grantham Sound, to embark the men of the 7th Duke of Edinburgh's Own Gurkha Rifles and their equipment, before sailing for the UK on 18 July 1982. She arrived at Southampton on 9 August 1982, 113 days after she had sailed to join the Task Force. In this time she had sailed 26,150 miles, consumed 4,700 tons of fuel, received more than 1,000 helicopter landings on her flight deck and 3,111 personnel had been transferred to or from her.

== Post war ==
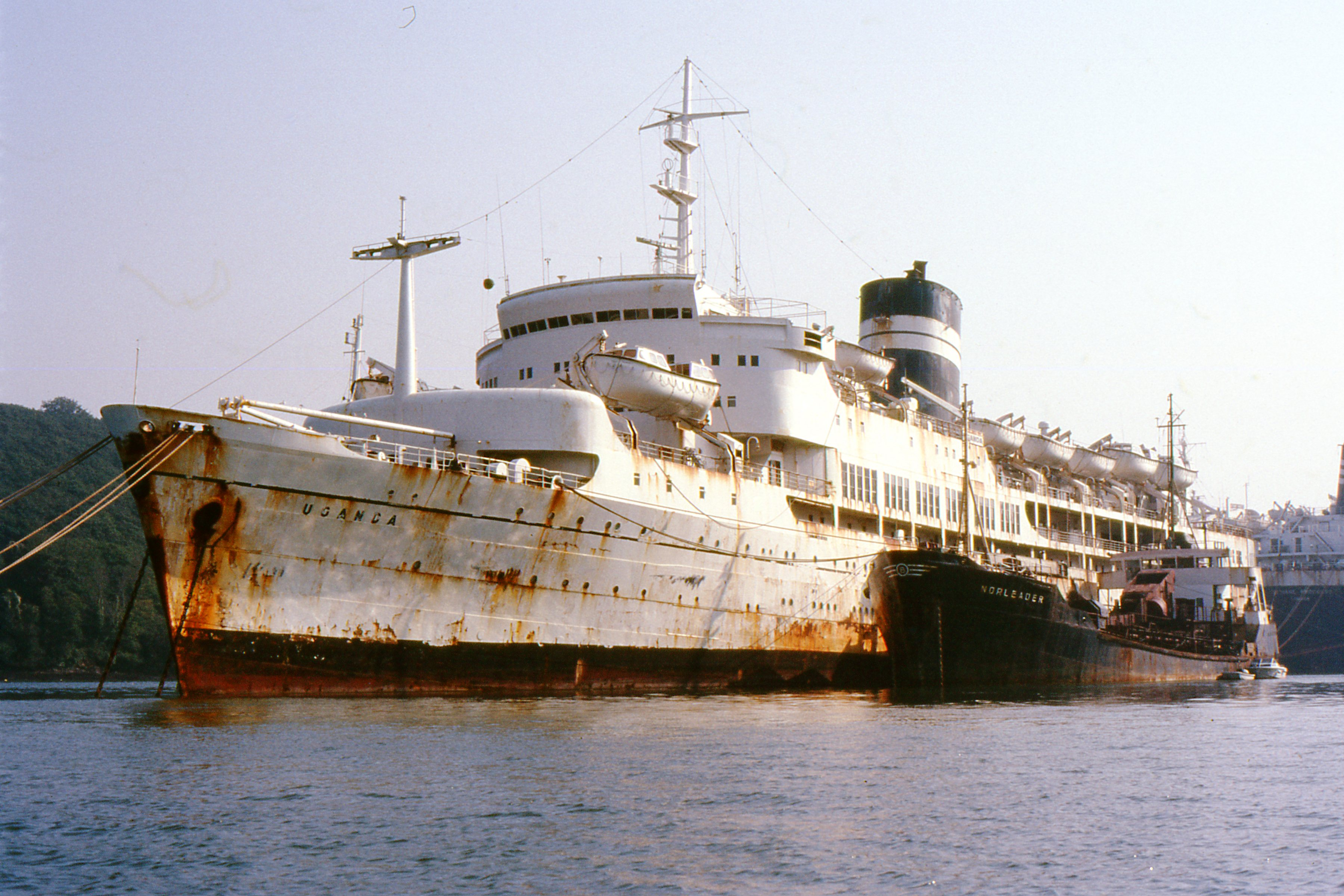
Uganda laid up in River Fal, 1985

Smiths Shiprepairers of North Shields extensively refitted Uganda, but her games deck windows never did close properly again after having Sea King helicopters landing on her quoits court. She returned to educational cruising on 25 September 1982, but in November she was chartered for two years to serve as a store ship between Ascension Island and the Falkland Islands. She was fitted with a new helicopter deck and on 14 January 1983 left Southampton for the Falklands again.

Uganda was refitted again at Falmouth in November 1983. She completed her charter in 1985, reached Falmouth on 25 April 1985 and was laid up in the River Fal on 4 May 1985.

== Triton ==
On 29 April 1986 the Triton Shipping Company of St Vincent bought Uganda and renamed her Triton. With a crew of 21 she left the Fal on 20 May and anchored off Kaohsiung in Taiwan on 15 July to await breaking. On 22 August Typhoon Wayne drove her ashore. She was still ashore on her side in March 1992, but has since been broken up.

== In popular culture ==
In 1970 Uganda was used in the Children's Film Foundation film All at Sea.
