= SS Nevasa =

British troopship built in 1955

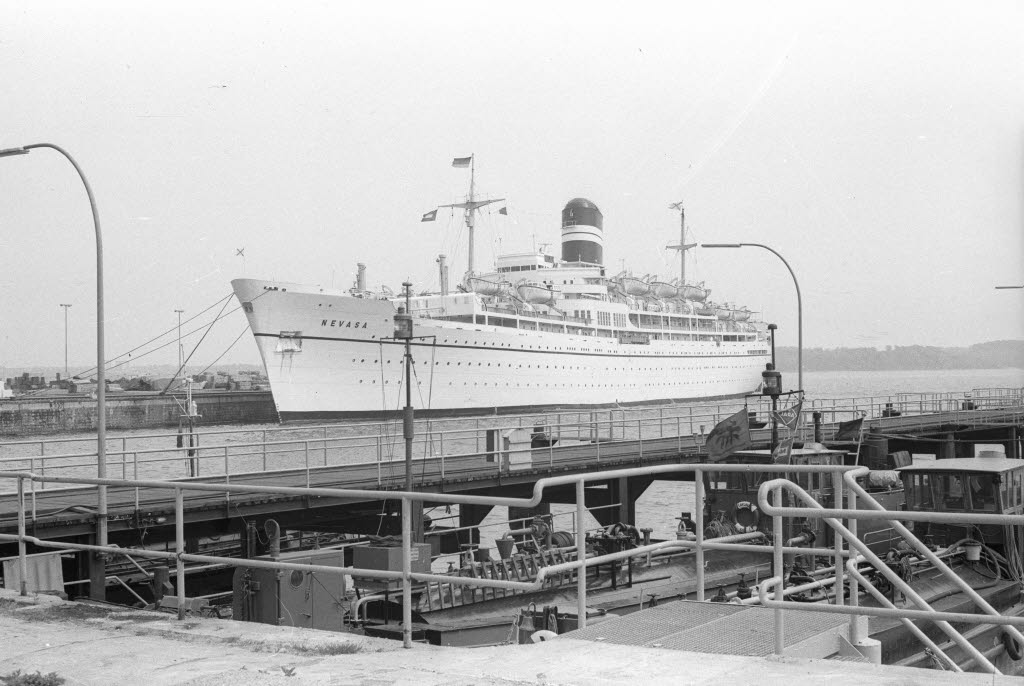
- Nevasa at Kiel in 1971

History

United Kingdom
- Name: SS Nevasa
- Owner: British India Steam Navigation Company (1955-1972); P&O (1972-1975)
- Port of registry: London
- Route: Troopship: UK to Far East via Suez; Schoolship: UK to Scandinavia, Baltic, North Sea, Iberian Peninsula, Mediterranean, North and West Africa, the Caribbean
- Builder: Barclay, Curle & Co. Ltd., Glasgow
- Yard number: 733
- Launched: 30 November 1955
- Completed: 12 July 1956
- Maiden voyage: 27 July 1956
- Fate: Scrapped in 1975

General characteristics
- Tonnage: 20,527 gross register tons (GRT); 11,496 net register tons (NRT); 8,271 tons deadweight (DWT)
- Length: 609 ft 3 in (185.70 m)
- Beam: 78 ft 3 in (23.85 m)
- Draught: 28 ft (8.5 m)
- Propulsion: 6 x Parsons steam turbines; twin screw propellers
- Speed: 17 knots (31 km/h; 20 mph)

This article is primarily about the third ship to bear this name; however, there were two previous ships: SS Nevasa (1884 to 1909) and HMT/HMHS Nevasa (1913 to 1948). All three ships were operated by the British India Steam Navigation Company.

SS Nevasa, also known as HMT Nevasa, was a British troopship built on the River Clyde, Scotland, in 1955 by Barclay, Curle & Co. Ltd. with financial support from the British Government and launched on 30 November 1955.

The name is thought to have come from Nevasa, a town (now a city) in Ahmednagar, India. There is an alternative possibility, that it was derived from a corruption of Naivasha, a town and lake northwest of Nairobi, Kenya.

The ship was the first troopship built since the end of the Second World War and the largest troopship at that time to be built in the United Kingdom. She entered trooping service in July 1956, shortly before the Suez Crisis and from then until October 1962 was continuously employed in reinforcing and relieving British garrisons in the Far and Middle East.

In 1962 she was withdrawn from government service and laid up until 1965 when she was converted to an educational cruise ship. She was sold in 1975 for scrap having completed almost 200 cruises with 188,000 students sailing 745,000 miles (1,200,000 km).

== Design and construction ==
The Nevasa was owned by the British India Steam Navigation Company (BI) and as originally built had a gross registered tonnage of 20,527 tons. New features for a troopship included Denny-Brown stabilisers to reduce rolling in rough seas and bunks rather than hammocks for the troops. The Nevasa had the capacity to accommodate 500 officers and their families and 1,000 NCOs and men on the troop decks. There were eight large dormitories fitted with three tier bunks and a smaller dormitory for NCO’s. In an emergency her capacity could be increased by adding a fourth bunk to the existing three tier bunks. The ship’s company was 409 Officers and Ratings.

She was delivered to BI in July 1956 commencing a 15-year charter with the British Ministry of Transport as HMT Nevasa. Known as the “Centenary Ship” because she was delivered 100 years after BI was founded and was their largest ship. Under charter, she did not show the BI funnel colours but the yellow funnel of the trooping service.

Nevasa was powered by two sets of three-stage Parsons (Pametrada) steam turbines driving twin screw propellers with a service speed of 17 knots. Steam was generated from four water tube boilers heated by fuel oil.

== Troopship ==
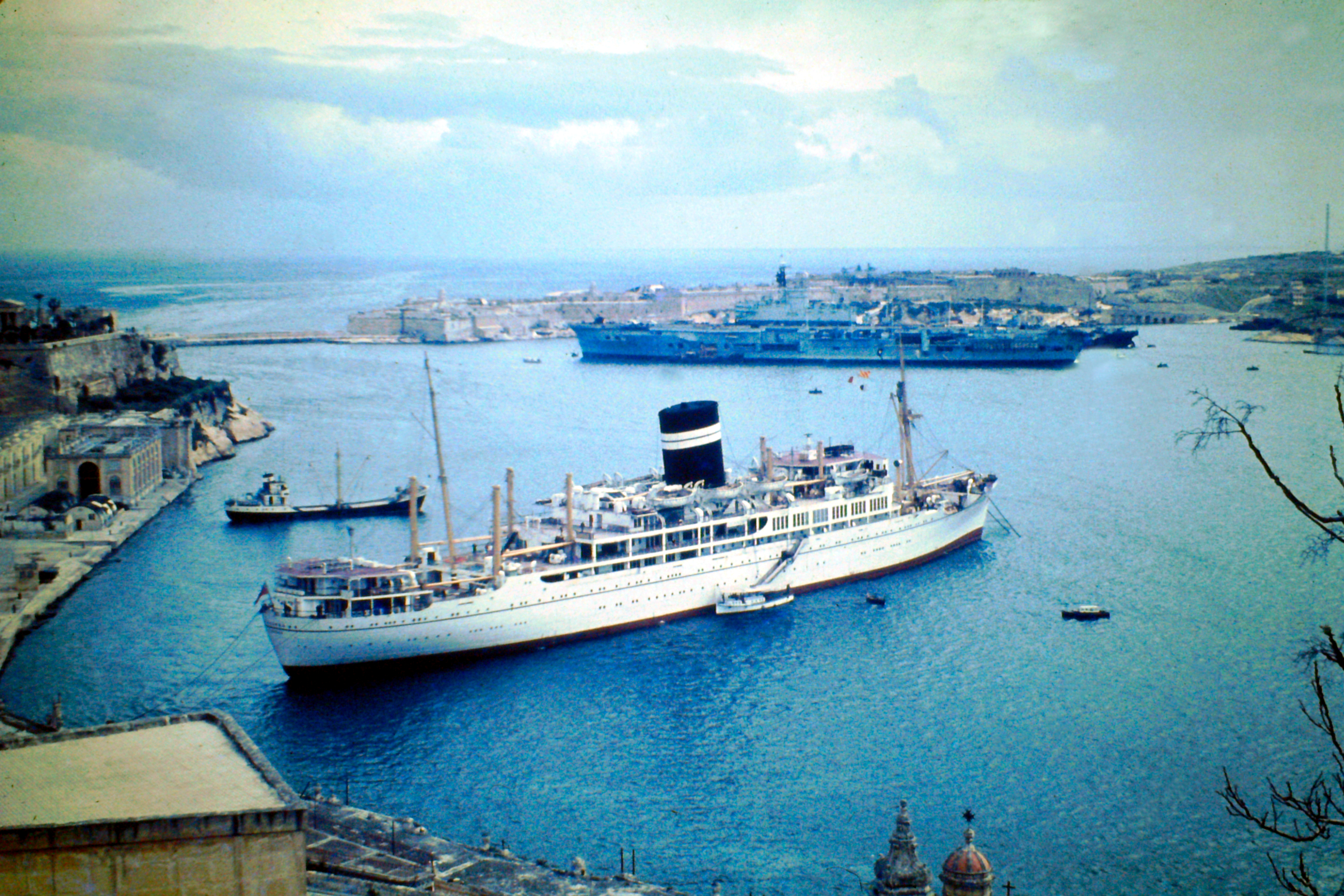
SS Nevasa & aircraft carrier HMS Eagle in Grand Harbour, Malta, July 1956

Her maiden voyage was from Southampton to Famagusta, Cyprus in July 1956 in support of the Suez Campaign. The following month the ship should have sailed on her first voyage to the Far East however it was delayed because of the Suez Crisis and finally departed Southampton on 16 October. As the Suez Canal was closed the ship sailed around the Cape of Good Hope to Durban then to Singapore and onwards to Hong Kong and Korea returning the same way as the canal only reopened in March 1957.

As a trooper she made regular voyages from Southampton to Hong Kong via the Suez Canal and Singapore and back completing on average four round trips a year. Gibraltar, Malta, Cyprus, Aden, Colombo, and Penang were often intermediate ports of call to pick up and set down troops. Typically, the time to Singapore was three weeks, reaching Hong Kong in a month. The ship occasionally visited other ports in Kenya, Korea, and Japan.

The ship was used to transport troops during the Suez Crisis in 1956. The ship transported many regiments to the Middle and Far East including the 1st Green Jackets (43rd and 52nd) who left Southampton on 7 April 1962 and arrived at Penang on 28 April 1962 via Port Said including stops at Malta and Aden. The 1st Green Jackets was the first unit to be posted to the Far East without any National Servicemen, following the end of conscription in 1960.

The ending of National Service and the British Government's decision in 1962 to abandon trooping by sea in favour of more cost-effective air transport made her redundant. As the charter contract was not due to expire until 1971, the government paid compensation for the early termination. Her last trooping voyage was in October 1962.

== Falmouth and Refit ==
After her last voyage she sailed to Falmouth in Cornwall and was laid up in the River Fal whilst BI decided what to do with a 7-year-old ship that was effectively obsolete for the role she was designed for.

The ship was laid up in the River Fal from October 1962 to November 1964. After this she became an educational cruise ship, later from 1968 with another BI ship SS Uganda. The conversion of the ship cost £500,000 (£10m equivalent in 2020) and took place in Falmouth, Cornwall. Her machinery gave her a greater range than the other educational cruise ships and her anti-roll stabilisers provided greater comfort.

After conversion, she had 127 Cabins with 307 berths and 50 Dormitories accommodating 1,090 in two tier bunks. The ship was segregated, Cabin class passengers had entirely separate accommodation, with their own sun and recreation decks, swimming pool, public rooms, bars, and dining saloon. The dormitories were on the lower decks. For the students there were 17 classrooms, a 450-seat assembly hall with stage and cinema screen, a recreation room, cafeteria, reading room, games room and a photographic developing room as well as deck space for games and a swimming pool.

Her gross registered tonnage increased from 20,527 to 20,746 (Recalculated as 20,160 with the introduction the 1969 IMO convention on tonnage). Her registered passenger capacity was 1,423 for most of her time as a school ship, a slight increase from the 1,397 at the time of the conversion. An additional dormitory was added on the aft promenade deck. The dormitories were all named after British Naval Officers, Admirals with some notable Captains. The ship's company consisted of 376 Officers and Ratings including a Director of Education with two deputies, two surgeons, two nursing sisters, seven matrons, one firemaster, five master at arms and two bank representatives.

After undergoing sea trials in September 1965, she sailed from Falmouth on 17 October 1965 with guests for a shakedown cruise and was positioned in Southampton for her first voyage as a School Ship.

== School Ship ==
On 28 October 1965 she sailed from Southampton on her first educational cruise to Madeira, Tangier and Lisbon returning to Southampton.

From then on Nevasa cruised continuously, taking a month off for an annual refit, usually in January. Voyages were to ports in the Baltic and North Sea, the Iberian Peninsula, Mediterranean, North and West Coast of Africa. There were also several cruises to the West Indies.

Most Cruises lasted between 10 and 14 days, a few longer, providing over 20 cruises annually. They often originated and/or terminated at Southampton. Sometimes other British ports would be used depending on where the most students were coming from, as often the ship had been block booked by a certain educational regional authority. Venice was also commonly used as an origin port. Charter aircraft would be used to ferry passengers to and from the UK. Most passengers were British students, aged 11 and upwards but in later years Canadian school groups were often on board. For many British and Canadian students who sailed on her, this was their first overseas experience.

BI had been a separate subsidiary of P&O since 1914, but in 1971 Nevasa's management and operation were transferred to P&O's Passenger Division. In 1972 P&O absorbed BI and Nevasa's ownership, however she retained her BI livery of white hull with a black band and black funnel with two white bands.

She was suddenly withdrawn from service at the end of 1974, leaving those who had already booked for 1975 disappointed. Some were later rebooked on the SS Uganda. Rapidly rising fuel costs during 1974 had made her uneconomical. Airfares had also become more expensive for the same reason, so the much needed bookings from Canadian Schools were falling short of expectations.

Nevasa departed the UK for the last time on 27 October 1974, sailing from Southampton. She cruised the Mediterranean until her last commercial trip in December 1974, a cruise to West Africa, finishing at Casablanca on 6 January 1975, where her passengers were flown back to the UK. She went on to Malta to discharge her stores arriving on 11 January 1975.

== Final Voyage ==
The Nevasa's final voyage was from Malta departing 15 February 1975 for Taiwan, to be scrapped. There were 69 crew and no passengers. As the Suez Canal was once again closed the ship's route for the six-week journey from Malta was via Dakar and Cape Town, crossing the Indian Ocean to the Sunda Strait between the Indonesian islands of Java and Sumatra to her final destination: the Port of Kaohsiung, in south-west Taiwan, on the northern South China Sea arriving 29 March 1975.
