= MV Dara =

British passenger and cargo liner

Coordinates: 25°34′29″N 55°27′58″E

History

United Kingdom
- Name: Dara
- Namesake: Dara Island
- Owner: British India SN Co
- Port of registry: London
- Route: Bombay – Persian Gulf
- Builder: Barclay, Curle & Co, Whiteinch
- Yard number: 711
- Launched: 17 December 1947
- Completed: June 1948
- Identification: UK official number 181938; call sign GDTT
- Fate: Explosion & fire 8 April 1961; sank 10 April 1961

General characteristics
- Class & type: D-class passenger and cargo ship
- Tonnage: 5,030 GRT, 2,766 NRT, 4,465 DWT
- Length: 398.7 ft (121.5 m) overall; 382.3 ft (116.5 m) registered
- Beam: 54.8 ft (16.7 m)
- Draught: 21 ft 11 3/4 in (6.70 m)
- Depth: 23.6 ft (7.2 m)
- Decks: 2
- Installed power: 4,200 bhp (3,100 kW)
- Propulsion: 1 × 5-cylinder 2-stroke diesel engine; 1 × screw
- Speed: 14 knots (26 km/h)
- Capacity: passengers: 20 × 1st class; 30 × A 2nd class; 24 × B 2nd class; 1,377 deck class
- Crew: 132
- Sensors & processing systems: wireless direction finding, echo sounding device, radar
- Notes: sister ships: Dumra, Dwarka, Daressa

MV Dara was a British passenger ship, built in 1948 by Barclay, Curle & Co. Ltd., Glasgow, Scotland. She travelled mostly between the Persian Gulf and the Indian subcontinent, carrying expatriate passengers who were employed in the nations of the Gulf.

After a powerful explosion on 8 April 1961, Dara caught fire and sank in the Persian Gulf on 10 April 1961. The disaster killed 238 of the 819 people aboard at the time, including 19 officers and 113 crew. Another 565 people were rescued in an operation by a British Landing Ship, Tank, three Royal Navy ships, and several British and foreign merchant ships. It was the greatest maritime disaster in peacetime since the sinking of the Titanic in 1912.

== Sinking ==
The Dara sailed from Bombay on 23 March, on a round trip to Basra, calling at intermediate ports. She reached Dubai on 7 April and was unloading cargo, embarking and disembarking passengers when the wind picked up. It quickly reached force seven and prevented further work. Another ship that had dragged her anchor in the bad weather collided with Dara. Although the structural damage was minimal, the impact decided the ship’s captain Elson to take Dara out of the anchorage to ride out the storm. Due to the conditions there had been no opportunity to disembark those people aboard who did not intend to travel, including relatives and friends seeing off passengers, cargo handlers and various shipping and immigration officials.

At about 04.33 on 8 April 1961, a large explosion struck the port side of the engine casing between decks, passing through the engine bulkhead and two upper decks, including the main lounge. The explosion occurred as Dara was returning to the harbour and it started several large fires. The explosion jammed the ship's steering and shut down her main generator. The fire spread rapidly, aided by the wind. Elson ordered the evacuation of the ship.

Launching the lifeboats was impeded by the rough sea, and by the fire spreading below the boat deck. One witness described an overcrowded lifeboat overturning due to the height of the waves. Another lifeboat that had been damaged earlier during the storm was met by the lifeboat of a Norwegian tanker. Several ships were nearby and aid was given by British, German and Japanese ships in the vicinity, as well as boats coming from Dubai, Sharjah, Ajman and Umm Al Quwain.

A nearly completed hotel building in Dubai was taken over as a reception centre for the injured, many of whom were suffering from burns, exposure and wounds from flying metal shards. The tide of injured people overwhelmed Al Maktoum Hospital and field stations were opened at Sheikh Rashid's Customs House office block.

In the days following, three British frigates and the US destroyer USS Laffey sent parties aboard Dara to extinguish the fires and the ship was then taken in tow by the Glasgow salvage vessel Ocean Salvor, but she sank at 09.20 on 10 April 1961.

== Possible cause of explosion ==
The explosion is believed to have been caused by a deliberately placed explosive device, planted by an Omani rebel group or individual insurgents. A British Admiralty court concluded, more than a year after the disaster, that an anti-tank mine, "deliberately placed by a person or persons unknown", had "almost certainly" caused the explosion. British Solicitor General Sir John Hobson, testifying before the court, said that fighters in the Dhofar Rebellion were likely to be responsible, having previously sabotaged British assets. However, no forensic evidence has ever been provided to prove that a bomb was the cause.

== Wreck ==
The wreck lies at a depth of 15 metres (49 ft).
