= British India Steam Navigation Company =

Former British company

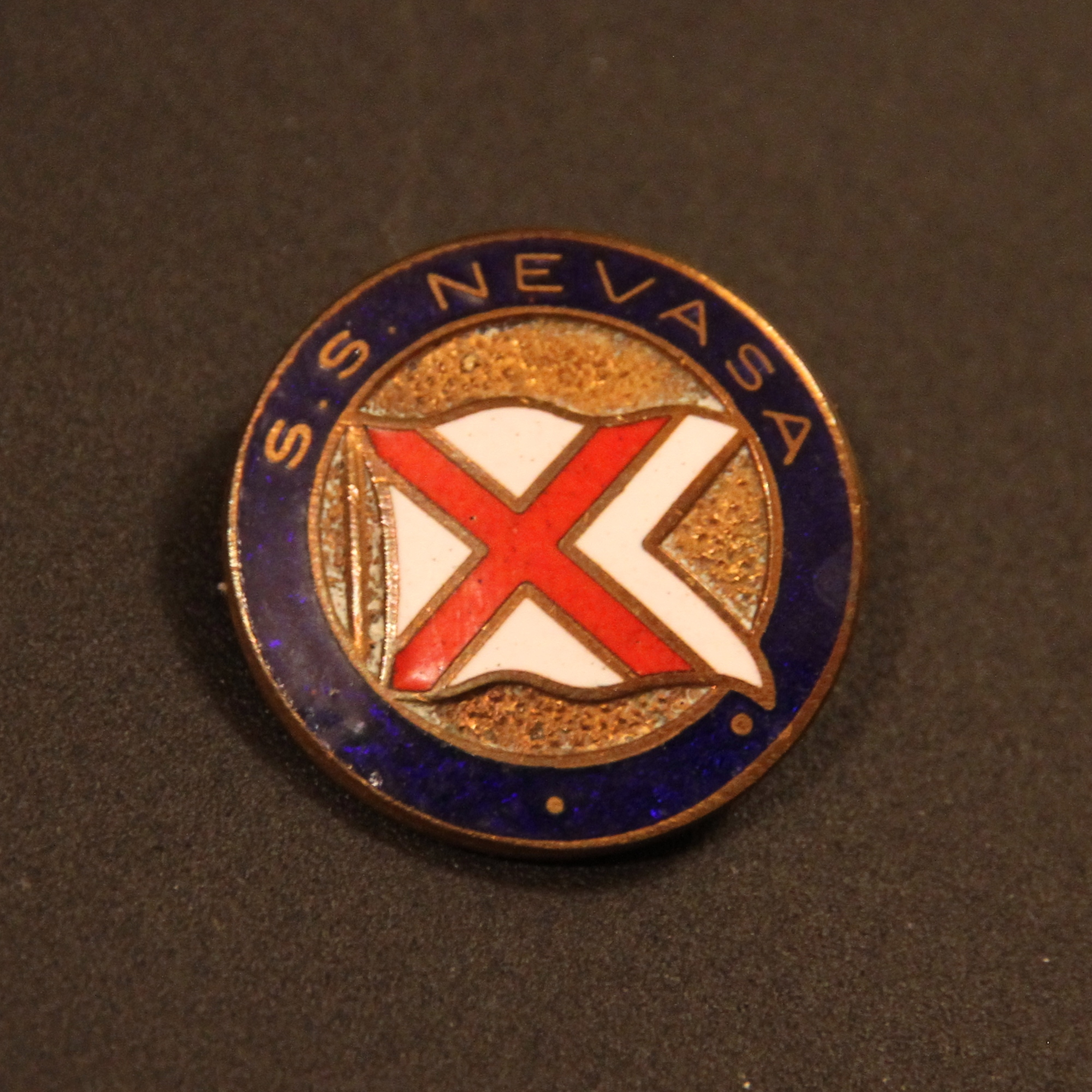
- Souvenir badge from Nevasa showing the BI house flag: a white swallowtail with a red saltire
- Company type: ship owner and ship operator
- Industry: transport
- Founded: 1856
- Defunct: 1972
- Successor: P&O
- Products: passenger and cargo shipping
- Parent: P&O (1914 onwards)
- Website: http://www.poheritage.com/our-history/company-guides/british-india-steam-navigation-company

British India Steam Navigation Company ("BI") was formed in 1856 as the Calcutta and Burmah Steam Navigation Company.

== History ==
The Calcutta and Burmah Steam Navigation Company had been formed out of Mackinnon, Mackenzie & Co, a trading partnership of the Scots William Mackinnon and Robert Mackenzie, to carry mail between Calcutta and Rangoon. It became British India SN Co in 1862. Under the hand of Lord Inchcape, who had become chairman in 1913, the company became part of the P&O group of companies in 1914 through a complex amalgamation, but continued with its own identity and organisation for another nearly 60 years until 1972, when it was entirely absorbed into P&O. P&O was eventually sold to Emirati logistics company DP World in 2006.

== Fleet and routes ==
As one of the largest shipowners of all time, the company owned more than 500 ships and managed 150 more for other owners. At its height in 1922, BI had more than 160 ships in the fleet, many built on Clydeside, Scotland. The main shipping routes of the line were: Britain to India, Australia, Kenya, Tanganyika. The company ran services from India to Pakistan, Ceylon, Bay of Bengal, Singapore, Malaya, Java, Thailand, Japan, Persian Gulf, East Africa and South Africa. BI had a long history of service to the British and Indian governments through trooping and other military contracts. In the last decade of its operational existence BI carried thousands of school children on educational cruises.

Mantola was sunk in February 1917 by a torpedo from a German submarine off the coast of Ireland with a substantial cargo of silver bullion.

The cargo ship Gairsoppa, carrying silver bullion, pig iron and tea, which was sunk at great depth by the German submarine U-101 in February 1941 some 300 nautical miles (560 km; 350 mi) southwest of Galway Bay, Ireland, carried the richest cargo of any sunken ship in world history.

Some of the company's better known passenger ships included Rajula, Dunera, Scindia, Sirdhana, Leicestershire, Dwarka, Dumra, the sister ships Kampala and Karanja, and Kenya and Uganda, and Dara, which was sunk by a terrorist bomb in 1961.

Nevasa of 1956 was the final passenger ship built for BI. Serving as a troopship until redundant in 1962, Nevasa was assigned new duties with the BI educational cruise ship flotilla until 1974, when she became uneconomic due a fourfold increase in crude oil prices and was scrapped in 1975 having earlier been joined in this trade by the more economic Uganda. The highly popular Uganda was taken up (STUFT) by the British Ministry of Defence in 1982 as a hospital ship during the Falklands War with Argentina. Returning to BI's tradition of government service again in 1983 – this time as a troopship – Uganda was "the last BI" when finally withdrawn in 1985. Dwarka holds the distinction of closing British-India's true "liner" services, when withdrawn from the company's Persian Gulf local trades in 1982, in her 35th year.

== Rank badges of ship's complement ==
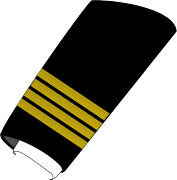
Commander

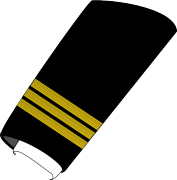
Chief Officer
with superior certificate

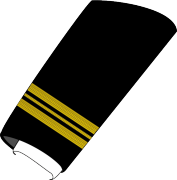
Chief Officer
with certificate of rank

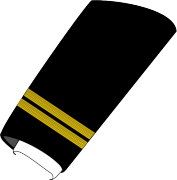
Second Officer
with superior certificate

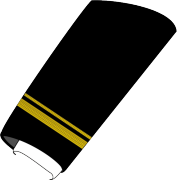
Second Officer
with certificate of rank

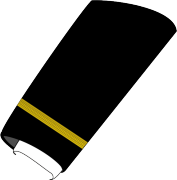
Third Officer
with certificate of rank

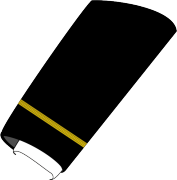
Fourth Officer
with certificate of rank

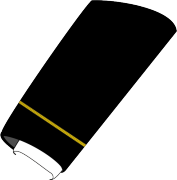
Third & Fourth Officer
without certificate

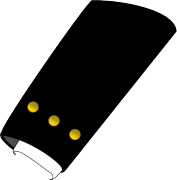
Cadet
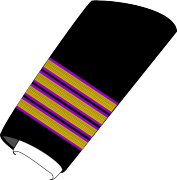
Chief Engineer Officer

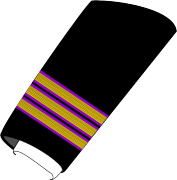
Second Engineer Officer
with superior certificate

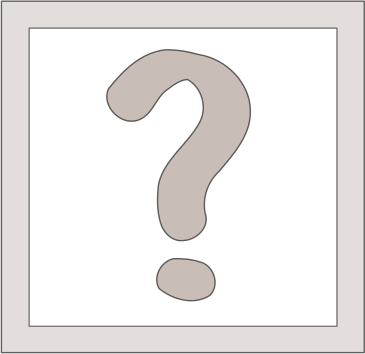
Second Engineer Officer
with certificate of rank

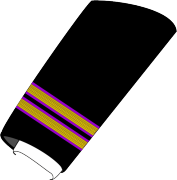
Third Engineer Officer
with certificate

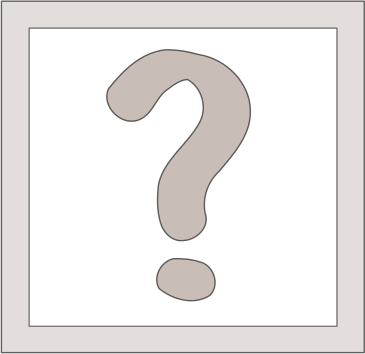
Third Engineer Officer

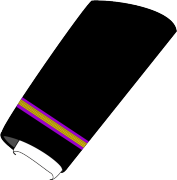
Fourth Engineer Officer

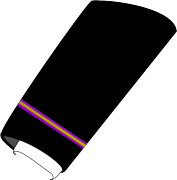
Junior Engineer Officer
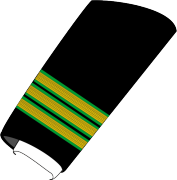
Senior Electrician

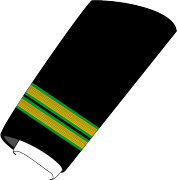
Second Electrician

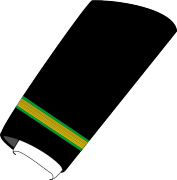
Junior Electrician
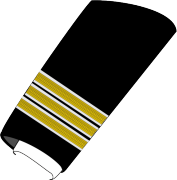
Senior Purser

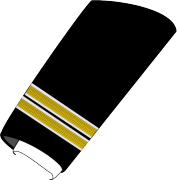
Purser

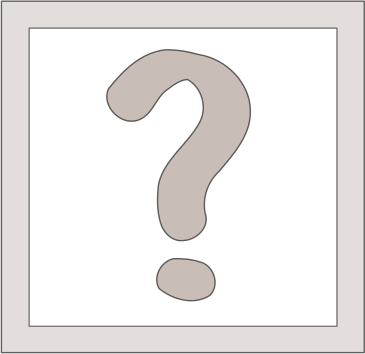
Assistant Purser
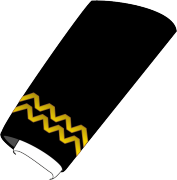
Chief Steward

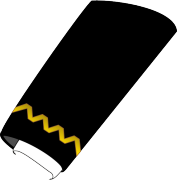
Second Steward

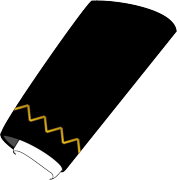
Extra Second Steward
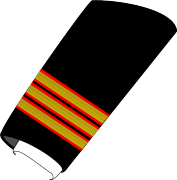
Doctor

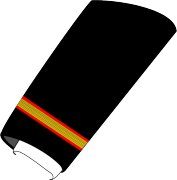
Nursing Sister

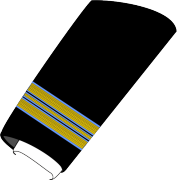
Matron

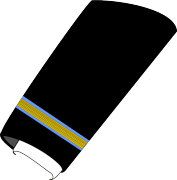
Assistant Matron
