= List of dry docks =

This is a list of the largest dry docks in the world, including excavated and floating docks.

Yard	Country	City	Dock name	L (m)	B (m)	D (m)	Newbuild	Repair	Floating dock	Roofed	ref
Sumitomo Heavy Industries	Japan	Yokosuka	Drydock	580	80			*	*		
Alabama Shipyard	United States of America	Mobile, Alabama	Drydock Alabama	240	65	9.8		*	*		
ASMAR Shipyards	Chile	Talcahuano	Dry Dock No. 1 Almirante Bannen	175	21.32	6	*	*			
SOCIBER	Chile	Valparaíso	Valparaíso III	167.1	26.1	9.72		*	*		
Naval Group Lorient	France	Lorient	Forme couverte	245.0	51.0		*			*	
Kinabalu North Shipyard & Maritime Sdn Bhd	Malaysia	Kota Kinabalu, Sabah	Titan, Floating Dry Dock	56	44			*	*		
Hellenika Ltd.	Bulgaria	Varna	Floating dock 1	155.00	23.8			*	*		
Hellenika Ltd.	Bulgaria	Varna	Floating dock 2	115.80	16.00			*	*		
Kuzey Star Shipyard	Turkey	Tuzla, Istanbul	Floating dock 1	200.00	32.40			*	*		
Kuzey Star Shipyard	Turkey	Tuzla, Istanbul	Floating dock 2	230.00	37.00			*			
Namdock 1	Namibia	Walvis Bay, Namibia	Namdock 1	139.50	25.00				*		
Namdock 2	Namibia	Walvis Bay	Namdock 2	139.50	25.00				*		EBHNamibia
Namdock 3	Namibia	Walvis Bay	Namdock 3	195.00	33.50				*		EBHNamibia
CIC-Shipyards (CIC)	China	Changxing, Shanghai	CS Putuoshan	247	36.6	8.5			*		
CIC-Shipyards (CIC)	China	Changxing, Shanghai	CS Jiuhuashan	308	50.0	17.5			*		
CIC-Shipyards (CIC)	China	Changxing, Shanghai	CS E’meishan	410	72.0	18.5			*		
CIC-Shipyards (CIC)	China	Lixin	CS Huashan	164	27.4				*		
CIC-Shipyards (CIC)	China	Lixin	CS Huangshan	190	28.4				*		
CIC-Shipyards (CIC)	China	Lixin	CS Pudong	222.5	38				*		
CIC-Shipyards (CIC)	China	Guangzhou (Boluomiao)	CS Yuexiushan	122	19.0				*		
CIC-Shipyards (CIC)	China	Guangzhou (Boluomiao)	CS Feilongshan	245	36.0				*		
COSCO Shipyard Group (COSCO)	China	Dalian	Dalian	350	66.0	27.0			*		
COSCO Shipyard Group (COSCO)	China	Dalian	Yuanyang No.1	260	48.5	22.5			*		
COSCO Shipyard Group (COSCO)	China	Dalian	Yuanyang No.1	240	40.0	11.8					
COSCO Shipyard Group (COSCO)	China	Nantong	Nantong	270	48.0	9.5			*		
COSCO Shipyard Group (COSCO)	China	Nantong	Yuantong	230	42.0	8.0			*		
COSCO Shipyard Group (COSCO)	China	Shanghai		195	35.0	12.8			*		
COSCO Shipyard Group (COSCO)	China	Zhoushan	No.1	280	40.0	12.9	*	*			
COSCO Shipyard Group (COSCO)	China	Zhoushan	No.2	410	68.0	14.3	*	*			
COSCO Shipyard Group (COSCO)	China	Zhoushan	No.3	539	49.2	11.3	*	*			
COSCO Shipyard Group (COSCO)	China	Guangdong	Cui Huashan	238	40.0	16.0			*		
COSCO Shipyard Group (COSCO)	China	Guangdong	Yuan Yang No.2	269	52.0	18.0			*		
COSCO Shipyard Group (COSCO)	China	Lianyungang	Zhongyuan Sheshan	240	37.0	12.8		*	*		
COSCO Shipyard Group (COSCO)	China	Guangzhou	Yuan Yang No.2	200	40.0	6.5		*	*		
COSCO Shipyard Group (COSCO)	China	Guangzhou	Cui Hua Shan	239	40.0	6.5		*	*		
Nantong COSCO KHI Ship Engineering (COSCO and KHI)	China	Nantong		230	42.0	8.0	*	*			
Nantong COSCO KHI Ship Engineering (COSCO and KHI)	China	Nantong		270	48.0	9.5					
Shanghai Shiprepair Centre	China	Shanghai		262	44.0						
Shanghai Shiprepair Centre	China	Shanghai		232	40.0	11.3					
Shanghai Shiprepair Centre	China	Shanghai		360	76.0						
Shanghai Shiprepair Centre	China	Shanghai		256	43.0						
Shanghai Shiprepair Centre	China	Shanghai		205	26.0						
Shanghai Shiprepair Centre	China	Shanghai		480	102.0						
Shanghai Shiprepair Centre	China	Shanghai		230	44.0	14.1			*		
Shanghai Shiprepair Centre	China	Shanghai		270	48.0	16.7			*		
Shanghai Shiprepair Centre	China	Shanghai		257	42.0	16.0			*		
Shanghai Shiprepair Centre	China	Shanghai		190	26.9	12.8			*		
Shanghai Shiprepair Centre	China	Shanghai		250	43.0	15.0			*		
Huangpu Shipyard (CSSC)	China	Guangzhou		248	168	14.3	*	*			CSSC
Hudong-Zhonghua Shipbuilding (CSSC)	China	Shanghai		380	92.0		*				
Shanghai Shipyard (CSSC)	China	Shanghai	Dry Dock 2#	262	44.0	10.9	*	*			CSSC
Shanghai Shipyard (CSSC)	China	Shanghai	Dry Dock 2#	205	36.0	10.4					CSSC
Shanghai Shipyard (CSSC)	China	Shanghai	Bai Yun Shang	190	26.9	13.0			*		CSSC
Shanghai Shipyard (CSSC)	China	Shanghai	Xin Xiang Shen	245	39.4	15.3			*		CSSC
Shanghai Shipyard (CSSC)	China	Shanghai	Hai Hua	192	29.0	14.4			*		CSSC
Shanghai Waigaoqiao Shipyard (CSSC)	China	Shanghai		480	106.0						
Shanghai Waigaoqiao Shipyard (CSSC)	China	Shanghai		360	76.0						
Shanghai Waigaoqiao Shipyard (CSSC)	China	Chongming (Shanghai Jiangnan-Changxing Shipbuilding)		510	106.0						
Shanghai Waigaoqiao Shipyard (CSSC)	China	Chongming (Shanghai Jiangnan-Changxing Shipbuilding)		520	76.0						
Dalian Shipbuilding Industry Company (CSIC)	China	Dalian		400	96.0	13.0	*	*			
Dalian Shipbuilding Industry Company (CSIC)	China	Dalian		135	15.6						
Dalian Shipbuilding Industry Company (CSIC)	China	Dalian		550	80.0						
Dalian Shipbuilding Industry Company (CSIC)	China	Dalian		165	25.0						
Dalian Shipbuilding Industry Company (CSIC)	China	Dalian		150	68.0						
Dalian Shipbuilding Industry Company (CSIC)	China	Dalian		304	52.0						
Shanhaiguan Shipbuilding Industry (CSIC)	China	Qinhuangdao	Dock No. 1	170	28.0	9.8	*	*			
Shanhaiguan Shipbuilding Industry (CSIC)	China	Qinhuangdao	Dock No. 2	240	28.0	11.4	*	*			
Shanhaiguan Shipbuilding Industry (CSIC)	China	Qinhuangdao	Dock No. 3	340	64.0	12.8	*	*			
Qingdao Beihai Shipbuilding Heavy Industry	China	Qingdao		480	96.0	14.1	*	*			
Qingdao Beihai Shipbuilding Heavy Industry	China	Qingdao		530	121.0	13.1	*	*			
Qingdao Beihai Shipbuilding Heavy Industry	China	Qingdao		360	78.0	13.1	*	*			
Qingdao Beihai Shipbuilding Heavy Industry	China	Qingdao		325	58.0	13.1	*	*			
Qingdao Beihai Shipbuilding Heavy Industry	China	Qingdao		250	45.0		*	*	*		
Yantai Raffles Shipyard	China	Yantai		430	120.0	12.0	*	*			
Yantai Raffles Shipyard	China	Yantai		205	45.0	8.0					
Yiu Lian Dockyards (China Merchants Holdings)	China	Shekou	No.1	400	83	8		*			
Yiu Lian Dockyards (China Merchants Holdings)	China	Shekou	No.2	360	67	8.5		*			
Yiu Lian Dockyards (China Merchants Holdings)	China	Shekou	No.3	240.5	36	6		*	*		
Yiu Lian Dockyards (China Merchants Holdings)	China	Shekou	No.4	190	27.8	6		*	*		
Yiu Lian Dockyards (China Merchants Holdings)	China	Shekou	No.3 (Hongkong)	305	45.8	15		*	*		
Mumbai Port Trust	India	Mumbai	Hughes Dry Dock	304	30.5	12.0		*			Mumbai Port Trust
Mumbai Port Trust	India	Mumbai	Merewether Dry Dock	152	18.3	8.7		*			Mumbai Port Trust
Chowgule Lavgan Shipyard	India	Ratnagiri	6 Dry Berths | 1 Wet Berth 260m | 1 Load in/out Jetty 80m;	120	26.0						
Pipavav Shipyard	India	Port Pipavav		662	65.0						
IHI	Japan	Chita (Aichi Shipyard)		350	90.0	7.2		*			
IHI	Japan	Aioi (IHI Amtec)	No. 1	225	32.2	6.5					
IHI	Japan	Aioi (IHI Amtec)	No. 3	325	54.5	6.5					
IHI	Japan	Yokohama (IHI Marine United)		340	53.7	6.0					
IHI	Japan	Yokohama (IHI Marine United)	Sagami	240	40.0	6.2			*		
IHI	Japan	Yokohama (IHI Marine United)	Negishi	175	33.0	7.2			*		
IHI	Japan	Showa-cho, Hiroshima (IHI Marine United)		300	40.0	9.0					
IHI	Japan	Kitahama-Machi (IHI Corporation)		340	56.0	6.5					
Imabari Shipbuilding	Japan	Koura-cho (Imabari Shipyard)	No.2 Dry Dock	211	43.0		*				
Imabari Shipbuilding	Japan	Marugame	No.1 drydock	270	45.0		*				
Imabari Shipbuilding	Japan	Marugame	No.3	610	80	11.7	*				
Imabari Shipbuilding	Japan	Marugame	No.2 drydock	370	57.0		*				
Imabari Shipbuilding	Japan	Saijo		420	89.0		*				
Imabari Shipbuilding	Japan	Mihara (Koyo Dockyard)	No.1 Building Dock	378	59.0		*				
Imabari Shipbuilding	Japan	Mihara (Koyo Dockyard)	No.1 Dry Dock	250	38.0			*			
Imabari Shipbuilding	Japan	Mihara (Koyo Dockyard)	No.2 Dry Dock	300	45.0			*			
Imabari Shipbuilding	Japan	Mihara (Koyo Dockyard)	No.5 Dry Dock	350	56.0		*	*			
Imabari Shipbuilding	Japan	Iwagi (Iwagi Zosen)	No.1 Dry Dock	215	38.6		*				
Imabari Shipbuilding	Japan	Ikata Kou (Shimanami Shipyard)	Slipway	200	34.0		*				
Imabari Shipbuilding	Japan	Kasadoshima (Shin Kasado Dockyard)	No.1 Dry Dock	154	21.2			*			
Imabari Shipbuilding	Japan	Kasadoshima (Shin Kasado Dockyard)	No.2 Dry Dock	227	37.0			*			
Imabari Shipbuilding	Japan	Kasadoshima (Shin Kasado Dockyard)	No.3 Dry Dock	255	50.0			*			
Imabari Shipbuilding	Japan	Honjo (I-S Shipyard)		178	30.0		*				
Kawasaki Shipbuilding Corporation	Japan	Kobe		113	20.0						
Kawasaki Shipbuilding Corporation	Japan	Kobe		250	43.2						
Kawasaki Shipbuilding Corporation	Japan	Kobe		215	33.5						
Kawasaki Shipbuilding Corporation	Japan	Kobe		127	15.4				*		
Kawasaki Shipbuilding Corporation	Japan	Kobe		281	46.4				*		
Kawasaki Shipbuilding Corporation	Japan	Sakaide		380	62.0						
Kawasaki Shipbuilding Corporation	Japan	Sakaide		450	72.0						
Kawasaki Shipbuilding Corporation	Japan	Sakaide		420	75.0						
Oshima Shipbuilding Co. Ltd.	Japan	Oshima (Saikai, Nagasaki)	Building	535	80	13	*				
Mitsubishi Heavy Industries	Japan	Koyagi (Nagasaki)	Building Dock	990	100.0	14.5	*				
Mitsubishi Heavy Industries	Japan	Akunoura-machi (Nagasaki)	No. 1	375	56.0	14.0	*				
Mitsubishi Heavy Industries	Japan	Akunoura-machi (Nagasaki)	No. 2	350	56.0	14.0		*			
Mitsubishi Heavy Industries	Japan	Akunoura-machi (Nagasaki)	No. 3	277	38.8	12.3		*			
Mitsubishi Heavy Industries	Japan	Koyagi, Nagasaki	Repair	400	100.0	14.5		*			
Mitsubishi Heavy Industries	Japan	Shimonoseki (Enoura, Hiroshima)	No. 1	164	23.8	9.5					
Mitsubishi Heavy Industries	Japan	Shimonoseki (Enoura, Hiroshima)	No. 2	217	32.0	10.0					
Mitsubishi Heavy Industries	Japan	Shimonoseki (Enoura, Hiroshima)	No. 3	83	16.3	5.9					
Mitsubishi Heavy Industries	Japan	Shimonoseki (Enoura, Hiroshima)	No. 4	56	10.5	4.4					
Mitsubishi Heavy Industries	Japan	Nishikicho (Honmoku, Yokohama)	No.1 Dry Dock	350	60.0	8.8					
Mitsubishi Heavy Industries	Japan	Nishikicho (Honmoku, Yokohama)	No.2 Dry Dock	270	60.0	9.8					
Mitsubishi Heavy Industries	Japan	Nishikicho (Honmoku, Yokohama)	No.3 Dry Dock	180	30.0	10.7					
Mitsubishi Heavy Industries	Japan	Nishikicho (Honmoku, Yokohama)	Floating dock	60	41.5						
Mitsubishi Heavy Industries	Japan	Wadasaki-cho (Kobe)	No. 1	95	19.0	11.7			*		
Mitsubishi Heavy Industries	Japan	Wadasaki-cho (Kobe)	No. 2	209	33.6	14.5			*		
Mitsubishi Heavy Industries	Japan	Wadasaki-cho (Kobe)	No. 4	302	43.7	9.5					
Mitsui Engineering and Shipbuilding	Japan	Tamano (Okayama)		216	30.3						
Mitsui Engineering and Shipbuilding	Japan	Tamano (Okayama)		195	81.0						
Mitsui Engineering and Shipbuilding	Japan	Chiba		310	45.0	10.5					
Mitsui Engineering and Shipbuilding	Japan	Chiba		400	72.0	12.5					
Mitsui Engineering and Shipbuilding	Japan	Chiba		219	72.0	12.5					
Mitsui Engineering and Shipbuilding	Japan	Yura (Wakayama)		350	65.0	14.3					
Universal Shipbuilding Corporation	Japan	Arao (Ariake Shipyard)	Dock No. 1	620	85.0	14.0	*				
Universal Shipbuilding Corporation	Japan	Arao (Ariake Shipyard)	Dock No. 2	420	85.0	14.0	*				
Universal Shipbuilding Corporation	Japan	Tsu (Toyota, Tsu Shipyard)	Dock No. 1	500	75.0	11.8	*				
Universal Shipbuilding Corporation	Japan	Tsu (Toyota, Tsu Shipyard)	Dock No. 2	500	75.0	14.1		*			
Universal Shipbuilding Corporation	Japan	Maizuru Shipyard	Dock No. 1	172	36.0		*				
Universal Shipbuilding Corporation	Japan	Maizuru Shipyard	Dock No. 2	258	36.4	12.7		*			
Universal Shipbuilding Corporation	Japan	Maizuru Shipyard	Dock No. 3	246	33.5		*				
Universal Shipbuilding Corporation	Japan	Keihin Shipyard	Dock No. 3	90	20.0		*				
Universal Shipbuilding Corporation	Japan	Keihin Shipyard	Floating Dock	135	22.0				*		
Universal Shipbuilding Corporation	Japan	Keihin Shipyard	Dock No. 1	175	35.0			*			
Universal Shipbuilding Corporation	Japan	Keihin Shipyard	Dock No. 2	283	46.5			*			
Universal Shipbuilding Corporation	Japan	Innoshima Shipyard	Dock No. 1	175	25.1	6.6					
Universal Shipbuilding Corporation	Japan	Innoshima Shipyard	Dock No. 2	283	46.6	8.9					
Universal Shipbuilding Corporation	Japan	Innoshima Shipyard	Dock No. 3	260	56.8	8.5		*			
Sanoyas Hishino Meisho	Japan	Kojima (Okayama) (Mizushima)		675	63.0	12.5	*	*			
Sanoyas Hishino Meisho	Japan	Osaka	Dry dock No.1	153	21.4	7.4		*			
Sanoyas Hishino Meisho	Japan	Osaka	Dry dock No.2	112	16.8	7.0		*			
Sasebo Heavy Industries	Japan	Sasebo (Nagasaki)	1	154	26.5	12.9		*			
Sasebo Heavy Industries	Japan	Sasebo (Nagasaki)	2	223	32.5	14.4		*			
Sasebo Heavy Industries	Japan	Sasebo (Nagasaki)	3	370	70.0	14.3		*			
Sasebo Heavy Industries	Japan	Sasebo (Nagasaki)	4	400	57.0	15.6	*				
Sasebo Heavy Industries	Japan	Sasebo (Nagasaki)	5	174	30.3	11.8		*			
Sasebo Heavy Industries	Japan	Sasebo (Nagasaki)	6	180	29.3	12.9		*			
Shin Kasado Dockyard	Japan	Kudamatsu	No 1	141	20.9	6.3		*			
Shin Kasado Dockyard	Japan	Kudamatsu	No 3	227	37.0	6.8		*			
Shin Kasado Dockyard	Japan	Kudamatsu	No 5	244	44.8	6.4	*				
Tsuneishi Shipbuilding	Japan	Tsuneishi, Fukuyama, Hiroshima	Construction Dock	266	46.0	9.0	*				
Tsuneishi Shipbuilding	Japan	Tsuneishi, Fukuyama, Hiroshima	Dock 1	250	49.5	8.1		*			
Tsuneishi Shipbuilding	Japan	Tsuneishi, Fukuyama, Hiroshima	Dock 10	160	35.6	6.3		*			
Tsuneishi Shipbuilding	Japan	Tsuneishi, Fukuyama, Hiroshima	Dock 11	150	31.7	6.3		*			
Tsuneishi Shipbuilding	Japan	Tsuneishi, Fukuyama, Hiroshima	Dock 12	330	54.5	7.8		*			
Tsuneishi Shipbuilding	Japan	Tadotsu	Construction Dock	380	59.0	7.9	*	*			
Tsuneishi Shipbuilding	Philippines	Balamban, Cebu		128	23.3			*	*		
Tsuneishi Shipbuilding	Philippines	Balamban, Cebu		140	24.5			*	*		
Tsuneishi Shipbuilding	Philippines	Balamban, Cebu	Construction Dock	450	60.0		*				
Tsuneishi Shipbuilding	China	Zhoushan									
PT PAL Indonesia (Persero)	Indonesia	Soerabaja		300	32.0	10.3					
PT PAL Indonesia (Persero)	Indonesia	Soerabaja		250	26.0	14.0					
PT PAL Indonesia (Persero)	Indonesia	Soerabaja		128	20.3	6.0			*		
Labuan Shipyard & Engineering (LSE)	Malaysia	Labuan	Syncrolift	140	28.0	8.5	*	*	*		
Shin Yang Shipyard	Malaysia	Miri, Sarawak	Floating Dock No. 1	60	23.0	12		*	*		
Shin Yang Shipyard	Malaysia	Miri, Sarawak	Floating Dock No. 2	160	48.0	12.9	*	*	*		
Malaysia Marine & Heavy Engineering	Malaysia	Pasir Gudang, Johor	Dock № 1	385	80.0	14.0	*				
Malaysia Marine & Heavy Engineering	Malaysia	Pasir Gudang, Johor	Dock № 2	270	46.0	12.5	*		*		
Malaysia Marine & Heavy Engineering	Malaysia	Pasir Gudang, Johor	Dock № 3	350	80.0	14	*	*			
Jurong Shipyard (Sembcorp)	Singapore	Jurong West	DD 1	270	40.0	10.0	*	*			
Jurong Shipyard (Sembcorp)	Singapore	Jurong West	DD 2	350	56.0	12.0	*	*			
Jurong Shipyard (Sembcorp)	Singapore	Jurong West	DD 3	380	80.2	14.0	*	*			
Jurong Shipyard (Sembcorp)	Singapore	Jurong West	DD 5	335	56.0	11.0	*	*			
Keppel Shipyard	Singapore	Tuas	Tuas Dock	350	66.0						
Keppel Shipyard	Singapore	Tuas	Raffles Dock	355	60.0						
Keppel Shipyard	Singapore	Tuas	Temasek Dock	301	52.0						
Keppel Shipyard	Singapore	Benoi	No. 1 drydock	350	60.0						
Keppel Shipyard	Singapore	Benoi	No. 2 drydock	300	60.0						
Keppel Shipyard	Singapore	Gul	Floating Dock No. 1	190	33.0						
Keppel Shipyard	Singapore	Gul	Floating Dock No. 2	120	27.0						
Keppel Shipyard	Singapore	Gul	Floating Dock No. 4	158	23.0						
Sembawang Shipyard (Sembcorp)	Singapore	Woodlands	Premier	384	64.0	8.5					
Sembawang Shipyard (Sembcorp)	Singapore	Woodlands	President	290	48.0	8.5			*		
Sembawang Shipyard (Sembcorp)	Singapore	Woodlands	King George VI (KGVI)	303	39.6	13.1					
Sembawang Shipyard (Sembcorp)	Singapore	Woodlands	Republic	202	42.0	10.3			*		
Sembawang Shipyard (Sembcorp)	Singapore	Woodlands	KFD	230	35.0	7.3			*		
CSBC Corporation, Taiwan	Taiwan	Kaohsiung		950	92.0	14.0	*	*			
CSBC Corporation, Taiwan	Taiwan	Kaohsiung		275	45.0	12.0	*	*			
CSBC Corporation, Taiwan	Taiwan	Keelung		275	45.0	10.2	*	*			
CSBC Corporation, Taiwan	Taiwan	Keelung		210	26.4	12.4	*	*			
CSBC Corporation, Taiwan	Taiwan	Keelung		270	45.0	11.5	*	*			
Dubai Drydocks	United Arab Emirates	Dubai (Port Rashid)	Dock No.2	521	100.0	12.0	*	*			
Dubai Drydocks	United Arab Emirates	Dubai (Port Rashid)	Dock No.3	411	80.0	12.0	*	*			
Dubai Drydocks	United Arab Emirates	Dubai (Port Rashid)	Dock No.1	366	66.0	12.0	*	*			
Dubai Drydocks	United Arab Emirates	Dubai (Port Rashid)	Floating Dock	205	32.0		*	*	*		
Hyundai-Vinashin Shipyard	Vietnam	Ninh Phuoc	No. 1 Dock	260	45.0	13.0					
Hyundai-Vinashin Shipyard	Vietnam	Ninh Phuoc	No. 2 Dock	380	65.0	13.0					
STX Offshore & Shipbuilding	South Korea	Jinhae	Building Dock No. 1	385	74.0						
STX Offshore & Shipbuilding	South Korea	Jinhae	Floating Dock No. 1	355	58.0				*		
STX Offshore & Shipbuilding	China	Dalian	No. 1	430	135.0						
Daewoo Shipbuilding & Marine Engineering	South Korea	Okpo, Geoje	No.1	530	131.0	14.5					
Daewoo Shipbuilding & Marine Engineering	South Korea	Okpo, Geoje	No.2	539	81.0	14.5					
Daewoo Shipbuilding & Marine Engineering	South Korea	Okpo, Geoje	F.D No.1	298	51.5	20.3			*		
Daewoo Shipbuilding & Marine Engineering	South Korea	Okpo, Geoje	F.D No.2	238	38.8	26.9			*		
Daewoo Shipbuilding & Marine Engineering	South Korea	Okpo, Geoje	F.D No.3	362	62.0	21.0			*		
Daedong Shipbuilding	South Korea	Chinhae		320	74.0	11.0					
Samsung Heavy Industries	South Korea	Geoje	Dock No. 1	283	46.0	11.0	*				
Samsung Heavy Industries	South Korea	Geoje	Dock No. 2	390	65.0	11.0	*				
Samsung Heavy Industries	South Korea	Geoje	Dock No. 3	640	97.5	12.7	*				
Samsung Heavy Industries	South Korea	Geoje	G1 Dock	270	52.0	15.0	*		*		
Samsung Heavy Industries	South Korea	Geoje	G2 Dock	400	55.0	15.0	*		*		
Samsung Heavy Industries	South Korea	Geoje	G3 Dock	400	70.0	16.0	*		*		
Hyundai Heavy Industries	South Korea	Ulsan	Dry Docks No. 1	390	80.0	12.7	*				
Hyundai Heavy Industries	South Korea	Ulsan	Dry Docks No. 2	500	80.0	12.7	*				
Hyundai Heavy Industries	South Korea	Ulsan	Dry Docks No. 3	672	92.0	13.4	*				
Hyundai Heavy Industries	South Korea	Ulsan	Dry Docks No. 4	380	65.0	12.7	*				
Hyundai Heavy Industries	South Korea	Ulsan	Dry Docks No. 5	380	65.0	12.0	*				
Hyundai Heavy Industries	South Korea	Ulsan	Dry Docks No. 6	260	43.0	12.0	*				
Hyundai Heavy Industries	South Korea	Ulsan	Dry Docks No. 7	170	25.0	11.0	*				
Hyundai Heavy Industries	South Korea	Ulsan	Dry Docks No. 8	460	70.0	12.7	*				
Hyundai Heavy Industries	South Korea	Ulsan	Dry Docks No. 9	460	70.0	12.7	*				
Hyundai Mipo Dockyard	South Korea	Ulsan	No. 1 Dock	380	65.0	12.5	*				
Hyundai Mipo Dockyard	South Korea	Ulsan	No. 2 Dock	380	65.0	12.5	*				
Hyundai Mipo Dockyard	South Korea	Ulsan	No. 3 Dock	380	65.0	12.5	*				
Hyundai Mipo Dockyard	South Korea	Ulsan	No. 4 Dock	300	76.0	12.5	*				
Hyundai Samho Heavy Industries	South Korea	Samho-Eup	No. 1 Dock	500	100.0	13.0	*				
Hyundai Samho Heavy Industries	South Korea	Samho-Eup	No. 2 Dock	594	104.0	13.0	*				
Hyundai Samho Heavy Industries	South Korea	Samho-Eup	Floating Dock	337	70.0	24.0	*		*		
Sungdong Shipbuilding & Marine Engineering	South Korea	Tongyeong	Yard No. 1	230	55.0	22.7	*		*		
Sungdong Shipbuilding & Marine Engineering	South Korea	Tongyeong	Yard No. 2	320	67.0	23.0	*		*		
Sungdong Shipbuilding & Marine Engineering	South Korea	Tongyeong	Yard No. 3	545	126.0	16.0	*				
Hanjin Heavy Industries and Construction	South Korea	Busan (Yeongdo)	Dry Dock No. 2	233	35.0	9.0	*				
Hanjin Heavy Industries and Construction	South Korea	Busan (Yeongdo)	Dry Dock No. 3	302	50.0	11.5	*				
Hanjin Heavy Industries and Construction	South Korea	Busan (Yeongdo)	Dry Dock No. 4	302	50.0	11.5	*				
Hanjin Heavy Industries and Construction	Philippines	Subic Bay Freeport Zone	Dry Dock No. 5	370	100.0	12.5	*				
Hanjin Heavy Industries and Construction	Philippines	Subic Bay Freeport Zone	Dry Dock No. 6	550	135.0	13.5	*				
Thales Australia	Australia	Garden Island, Sydney	Captain Cook graving dock	346	41.6	13.0	*	*			
Thales Australia	Australia	Garden Island, Sydney		63	12.9	5.0	*	*	*		
National Ports Authority of South Africa	South Africa	Durban		352	33.5	12.6		*			
National Ports Authority of South Africa	South Africa	Durban		109	23.3	6.0		*	*		
National Ports Authority of South Africa	South Africa	Cape Town	Sturrock Dry Dock	370	45.1	13.7		*			
National Ports Authority of South Africa	South Africa	Cape Town	Robinson Dry Dock	161	20.7	7.9		*			
South African Navy / Armscor	South Africa	Simon's Town	Selborne Graving Dock	231	36.58	13.7					
Sermetal Estaleiros	Brazil	Rio de Janeiro	Dry Dock 1	155	25.0	8.0					
Sermetal Estaleiros	Brazil	Rio de Janeiro	Dry Dock 2	350	65.0	10.0					
Astilleros Braswell International	Panama	Balboa	Dock No. 1	318	33.6	7.9		*			
Astilleros Braswell International	Panama	Balboa	Dock No. 2	130	25.9	6.4		*			
Astilleros Braswell International	Panama	Balboa	Dock No. 3	70	16.8	4.3		*			
Grand Bahama Shipyard	Bahamas	Freeport	Drydock No.1	268	33.5	8.0		*	*		
Grand Bahama Shipyard	Bahamas	Freeport	Drydock No.2	300	58.5	9.1		*	*		
Grand Bahama Shipyard	Bahamas	Freeport	Drydock No.3	310	54.6	8.5		*	*		
Grand Bahama Shipyard	Bahamas	Freeport	East End Dock	357	70			*	*		
Public Services and Procurement Canada	Canada	Victoria Shipyards	Esquimalt Graving Dock	357	41	12		*			
Washington Marine Group	Canada	Vancouver	Vancouver Dry Dock	220	45.8	8.8			*		
Washington Marine Group	Canada	Vancouver	Vancouver Shipyards	131	33.5				*		
Hawaii Shipyards (BAE Systems)	United States of America	Pearl Harbor (Hawaii)	Graving dock No. 4	320	42.4			*			
Devonport Naval Base	New Zealand	Devonport (Auckland)	Calliope Dry-Dock	181.4	24.3	8.0		*			
Lyttelton Port Company	New Zealand	Lyttelton (Canterbury)	Lyttelton Dry-Dock	137.15	18.8	5.8		*			
National Steel and Shipbuilding Company (General Dynamics)	United States of America	San Diego		305	53.0	9.1	*	*			
National Steel and Shipbuilding Company (General Dynamics)	United States of America	San Diego		250	41.4		*	*	*		
National Steel and Shipbuilding Company (General Dynamics)	United States of America	San Diego		289	42.7		*	*	*		
Bayonne Dry Dock Brooklyn	United States of America	Bayonne		333	45.0	11.0		*			
Bayonne Dry Dock Brooklyn	United States of America	Brooklyn		333	46.0	11.0		*			
Bay Shipbuilding Company (Fincantieri)	United States of America	Sturgeon Bay		352	42.7						
Bay Shipbuilding Company (Fincantieri)	United States of America	Sturgeon Bay		183	21.3				*		
Bay Shipbuilding Company (Fincantieri)	United States of America	Sturgeon Bay		69	11.9						
Huntington Ingalls Industries	United States of America	Newport News (Newport News Shipbuilding)	Dry Dock 12	662	76.0	9.5	*	*			
Huntington Ingalls Industries	United States of America	Newport News (Newport News Shipbuilding)		336	42.0	12.0	*	*			
Huntington Ingalls Industries	United States of America	Newport News (Newport News Shipbuilding)		293	38.0	9.0	*	*			
Huntington Ingalls Industries	United States of America	Newport News (Newport News Shipbuilding)	Dry Dock 2	262.8	35.4	9.5	*	*			
Huntington Ingalls Industries	United States of America	Newport News (Newport News Shipbuilding)	Dry Dock 1	198.2	28.0	8.5	*	*			
Huntington Ingalls Industries	United States of America	Newport News (Newport News Shipbuilding)		160	22.0	9.0	*	*			
Huntington Ingalls Industries	United States of America	Newport News (Newport News Shipbuilding)		140	22.0	9.0	*	*			
Huntington Ingalls Industries	United States of America	Newport News (Newport News Shipbuilding)		182.9	42.7	11.6	*	*	*		
Huntington Ingalls Industries	United States of America	Pascagoula, Mississippi, (Ingalls Shipbuilding)		274	66.4	10.7	*	*			
Huntington Ingalls Industries	United States of America	Pascagoula, Mississippi, (Ingalls Shipbuilding)		200	35.0	8.5	*	*			
Hanhwa Philadelphia Shipyard	United States of America	Philadelphia	Dry Dock 4 Building Dock	333	45.7	12.2					
Hanhwa Philadelphia Shipyard	United States of America	Philadelphia	Dry Dock 5 Outfit Dock	333	45.7	11.0					
Northeast Ship Repair	United States of America	Boston (Boston Ship Repair)		351	38.1			*			
Northeast Ship Repair	United States of America	Philadelphia (Philadelphia Ship Repair)		300	34.8			*			
Vigor Industrial	United States of America	Seattle, Washington	Evolution	195	35.3		*	*	*		
Vigor Industrial	United States of America	Portland, Oregon	The Vigorous	292.6	56.7	21.3		*	*		
Antwerp Ship Repair (Damen)	Belgium	Antwerp	1	146	18.5	5.5		*			
Antwerp Ship Repair (Damen)	Belgium	Antwerp	2	166	21.5	6.5		*			
Antwerp Ship Repair (Damen)	Belgium	Antwerp	3	193	26.0	7.0		*			
Antwerp Ship Repair (Damen)	Belgium	Antwerp	4	207	27.0	7.0		*			
Antwerp Ship Repair (Damen)	Belgium	Antwerp	5	255	39.0	8.0		*			
Antwerp Ship Repair (Damen)	Belgium	Antwerp	6	312	50.0	8.0		*			
Odense Steel Shipyard	Denmark	Odense	Dock No. I	300	45.0	7.5	*	*			
Odense Steel Shipyard	Denmark	Odense	Dock No. II	300	45.0	7.5					
Odense Steel Shipyard	Denmark	Odense	Dock No. II	415	90.0	11.0					
Blohm + Voss Repair (TKMS)	Germany	Hamburg	6	163	24.5	8.0		*	*		
Blohm + Voss Repair (TKMS)	Germany	Hamburg	10	288	44.2	10.2		*	*		
Blohm + Voss Repair (TKMS)	Germany	Hamburg	11	321	52.0	10.8		*	*		
Blohm + Voss Repair (TKMS)	Germany	Hamburg	16	200	32.0	9.5		*	*		
Blohm + Voss Repair (TKMS)	Germany	Hamburg	Elbe 17	351	59.2	9.5		*			
Blohm + Voss Shipyards (TKMS)	Germany	Hamburg	5	160	28.0	8.0	*		*		
Blohm + Voss Shipyards (TKMS)	Germany	Hamburg	12	143	25.0	8.0	*		*		
Howaldtswerke-Deutsche Werft (TKMS)	Germany	Kiel	8a	426	88.2	8.7	*				
Howaldtswerke-Deutsche Werft (TKMS)	Germany	Kiel	8	231	44.0	5.3	*				
Howaldtswerke-Deutsche Werft (TKMS)	Germany	Kiel	7	310	50.3	5.3	*				
Howaldtswerke-Deutsche Werft (TKMS)	Germany	Kiel	6	201	26.6	9.3	*				
Howaldtswerke-Deutsche Werft (TKMS)	Germany	Kiel	5	228	26.6	9.6	*				
Lloyd Werft Bremerhaven (Fincantieri)	Germany	Bremerhaven	Kaiserdock I	222	26.0	10.5		*			
Lloyd Werft Bremerhaven (Fincantieri)	Germany	Bremerhaven	Kaiserdock II	335	35.0	11.5		*			
Lloyd Werft Bremerhaven (Fincantieri)	Germany	Bremerhaven	Schwimmdock III	286	38.0	6.5		*	*		
Lloyd Werft Bremerhaven (Fincantieri)	Germany	Bremerhaven	Schwimmdock "Rickmers Lloyd"	147	21.0	6.5		*	*		
Meyer Werft	Germany	Papenburg		358	40.0	9.5	*			*	
Meyer Werft	Germany	Papenburg		482	45.0	10.0	*			*	
Meyer Werft	Germany	Papenburg		240	35.0			*			
Suez Odense Marine Service	Egypt	Suez		144	22.0			*			
Suez Odense Marine Service	Egypt	Suez		302	56.5			*	*		
Turku Repair Yard	Finland	Naantali (Turku)		265	70.0	7.9		*			
Turku Repair Yard	Finland	Naantali (Turku)		101	21.6	6.0		*	*		
Turku Repair Yard	Finland	Suomenlinna		120	50	5.0		*			
Meyer Turku	Finland	Turku		365	80.0		*				
STX Europe	Finland	Helsinki		280.5	34.0		*				
STX Europe	Finland	Rauma		260	85.0		*				
STX Europe	France	Saint-Nazaire (Chantiers de l'Atlantique)		900	70.0	15	*				
STX Europe	France	Saint-Nazaire (Chantiers de l'Atlantique)		450	90.0		*	*			
ARNO Dunkerque	France	Dunkerque	6	310	50.0	9.7		*			
ARNO Dunkerque	France	Dunkerque		107	14.0	6.6		*			
ARNO Dunkerque	France	Dunkerque		210	32.0	9.0		*	*		
Port Autonome du Havre / Soreni	France	Le Havre	Formes de l'Eure	184	23.6	8.7		*			
Port Autonome du Havre / Soreni	France	Le Havre	Formes de l'Eure	168	19.0	8.7		*			
Port Autonome du Havre / Soreni	France	Le Havre	Formes de l'Eure	131	14.2	7.8		*			
Port Autonome du Havre / Soreni	France	Le Havre	Dock Flottant	310	53.0	9.7		*	*		
Port Autonome du Havre / Soreni	France	Le Havre	Forme VII	319	38.0	17.5		*			
Port Autonome de Nantes / St. Nazaire	France	Saint-Nazaire	Louis Joubert	350	50.0	13.0	*	*			
Port Autonome de Nantes / St. Nazaire	France	Saint-Nazaire		226	30.0	9.0	*	*			
Port Autonome de Nantes / St. Nazaire	France	Saint-Nazaire		159	17.0	9.0	*	*			
Port Autonome de Nantes / St. Nazaire	France	Saint-Nazaire		117	11.0	6.0	*	*			
Port Autonome de Nantes / St. Nazaire	France	Saint-Nazaire		126	28.8		*	*	*		
Damen Shiprepair Brest (formerly Sobrena Shiprepair Yard)	France	Brest	1	225	27.0	4.6		*			
Damen Shiprepair Brest (formerly Sobrena Shiprepair Yard)	France	Brest	2	338	55.0	9.1		*			
Damen Shiprepair Brest (formerly Sobrena Shiprepair Yard)	France	Brest	3	420	80.0	10.4		*			
Port Autonome de Marseille	France	Marseille	Forme 10	465	84.0	9.2		*			
Port Autonome de Marseille	France	Marseille		320	50.0	12.0		*			
Port Autonome de Marseille	France	Marseille		250	37.0	8.0		*			
Port Autonome de Marseille	France	Marseille		171	19.3	5.6		*			
Port Autonome de Marseille	France	Marseille		137	17.2	3.4		*			
Port Autonome de Marseille	France	Marseille		125	15.6	5.6		*			
Port Autonome de Marseille	France	Marseille		121	14.6	5.6		*			
Hellenic Shipyards (TKMS)	Greece	Skaramagkas		421	75.0	5.5					
Hellenic Shipyards (TKMS)	Greece	Skaramagkas		335	53.6	7.9					
Hellenic Shipyards (TKMS)	Greece	Skaramagkas		252	37.0	8.5			*		
Hellenic Shipyards (TKMS)	Greece	Skaramagkas		232	34.0	6.0			*		
Hellenic Shipyards (TKMS)	Greece	Skaramagkas		196	32.0	6.5			*		
Cantiere navale fratelli Orlando	Italy	Livorno		350	56.0	9.7					
Cantiere navale fratelli Orlando	Italy	Livorno		137	17.5	6.0					
Cantieri del Mediterraneo	Italy	Naples	1	115	16.0	5.6		*			
Cantieri del Mediterraneo	Italy	Naples	2	206	21.0	7.0		*			
Cantieri del Mediterraneo	Italy	Naples	3	335	40.0	10.6		*			
Cantieri del Mediterraneo	Italy	Naples	5	227	35.0	7.0		*	*		
Fincantieri Cantieri Navali Italiani	Italy	Palermo	1	163	22.8	7.4	*	*			
Fincantieri Cantieri Navali Italiani	Italy	Palermo	2	193	30.2	7.8	*	*	*		
Fincantieri Cantieri Navali Italiani	Italy	Palermo	3	286	46.2	7.6	*	*	*		
Fincantieri Cantieri Navali Italiani	Italy	Palermo	4	370	68.0	11.4	*	*			
Fincantieri Cantieri Navali Italiani	Italy	Trieste	3	206	28.6	8.0					
Fincantieri Cantieri Navali Italiani	Italy	Trieste	4	295	56.0	11.0					
Fincantieri Cantieri Navali Italiani	Italy	Monfalcone		350	56.0	11.0	*				
Fincantieri Cantieri Navali Italiani	Italy	La Spezia (Muggiano)		265	38.0	9.5			*		
Fincantieri Cantieri Navali Italiani	Italy	Genoa	Sestri Ponente 1	255	36.0						
Fincantieri Cantieri Navali Italiani	Italy	Genoa	Sestri Ponente 2	285	42.0						
Malta Shipyards	Malta	Valletta	1	154	18.0	3.7		*			
Malta Shipyards	Malta	Valletta	2 (Hamilton)	170	25.0	8.8		*			
Malta Shipyards	Malta	Valletta	3 (somerset)	140	18.0	8.8		*			
Malta Shipyards	Malta	Valletta	4	262	40.0	8.5		*			
Malta Shipyards	Malta	Valletta	5	216	27.0	8.5		*			
Malta Shipyards	Malta	Valletta	6 (Red China)	360	62.0	9.1		*			
Malta Shipyards	Malta	Valletta	7	98	35.0	3.0		*			
Keppel Verolme	Netherlands	Rotterdam	5	230	33.5	8.0			*	*	
Keppel Verolme	Netherlands	Rotterdam	6	275	40.4	10.3			*	*	
Keppel Verolme	Netherlands	Rotterdam	7	405	90.0	11.1			*	*	
Shipdock	Netherlands	Amsterdam	Dock 4	250	36.3	8.0		*			
Shipdock	Netherlands	Amsterdam	Dock 3	205	26.8	8.2		*			
Shipdock	Netherlands	Amsterdam	Dock 2	165	21.5	6.0		*			
Shipdock	Netherlands	Amsterdam	Dock 1	140	19.5	5.1		*			
Damen Shiprepair Rotterdam	Netherlands	Schiedam	Dock 8	307	46.1	9.5		*			
Damen Shiprepair Rotterdam	Netherlands	Schiedam	Dock 7	217	28.3	8.9		*			
Damen Shiprepair Rotterdam	Netherlands	Schiedam	Dock 6	211	28.3	8.9		*		*	
Damen Shiprepair Rotterdam	Netherlands	Schiedam	Dock 1	175	25.8	6.4		*	*		
Damen Shiprepair Rotterdam	Netherlands	Schiedam	Dock 2	160	23.8	6.4		*	*		
Gdynia Shipyard	Poland	Gdynia		380	70.0	8.0					
Gdynia Shipyard	Poland	Gdynia		241	40.0	8.0					
Lisnave	Portugal	Setúbal	Dock nº 20	420	75.0	4.6		*			
Lisnave	Portugal	Setúbal	Dock nº 21	450	75.0	7.6		*			
Lisnave	Portugal	Setúbal	Dock nº 22	350	55.0	7.6		*			
Lisnave	Portugal	Setúbal	Dock nº 31	280	39.0	5.1		*			
Lisnave	Portugal	Setúbal	Dock nº 32	280	39.0	5.1		*			
Lisnave	Portugal	Setúbal	Dock nº 33	280	39.0	5.1		*			
Daewoo Mangalia Heavy Industries	Romania	Mangalia	No. 1 Dock	302	48.0	9.0					
Daewoo Mangalia Heavy Industries	Romania	Mangalia	No. 2 Dock	320	48.0	18.0					
Daewoo Mangalia Heavy Industries	Romania	Mangalia	No. 3 Dock	360	60.0	13.0					
Santierul Naval Constanta	Romania	Constanţa	Dry dock no. 1	350	58.0	10.0	*	*			
Santierul Naval Constanta	Romania	Constanţa	Dry dock no. 2	350	48.0	10.0	*	*			
Santierul Naval Constanta	Romania	Constanţa	Floating Dock no. 1	138	23.0	4.0	*	*	*		
Santierul Naval Constanta	Romania	Constanţa	Floating Dock no. 2	180	32.0	6.0	*	*	*		
Damen Shipyard Galati	Romania	Galaţi		230	35.0	4.5	*				
Damen Shipyard Galati	Romania	Galaţi		230	35.0	4.5	*				
Chazhma Bay	Russia	Vladivostok	PD-41	330	90.0	6.0			*		
Novorossiysk Shiprepair Yard	Russia	Novorossiysk	Dock № 2	220	28.0	9.0		*	*		
Novorossiysk Shiprepair Yard	Russia	Novorossiysk	Dock № 3	300	48.0	11.0		*	*		
Shiprepair Yard № 82	Russia	Roslyakovo, Murmansk Oblast	PD-50	330	88.0	6.1			*		
Navantia	Spain	Cádiz	Dock no.1	237	34.1			*			
Navantia	Spain	Cádiz	Dock no.2	246	41.3			*			
Navantia	Spain	Cádiz	Dock no.3	387	66.7			*	*		
Navantia	Spain	Cádiz (Puerto Real)	Dock no.1	525	100.0	9.0	*				
Navantia	Spain	Ferrol		330	50.0			*			
Navantia	Spain	Ferrol		205	25.0			*			
Navantia	Spain	Fene		255	38.0	9.0		*			
Navantia	Spain	Fene		155	24.0	5.2		*			
Navantia	Spain	Cartagena		214	20.5	7.5		*			
İstanbul Naval Shipyard	Turkey	Istanbul		116	24.2	5.7			*		
İstanbul Naval Shipyard	Turkey	Istanbul		189	29.4	6.5			*		
İstanbul Naval Shipyard	Turkey	Istanbul		300	70.0	8.5					
Chornomorsk Shiprepair Yard	Ukraine	Chornomorsk	Floating dock № 152	225	36.6			*	*		
Chornomorsk Shiprepair Yard	Ukraine	Chornomorsk	Floating dock № 154	225	36.6			*	*		
Chornomorsk Shiprepair Yard	Ukraine	Chornomorsk	Floating dock № 5 ZH-B	90.9	23.5			*	*		
Harland and Wolff Heavy Industries	United Kingdom	Belfast	Building Dock	556	93.0	8.4	*	*			
Harland and Wolff Heavy Industries	United Kingdom	Belfast	Belfast Dry Dock	335	50.3	12.2		*			
Able UK	United Kingdom	Teesside		376	122	12.15					
Cammell Laird, The Peel Group, Clydeport	United Kingdom	Inchgreen Drydock, Greenock		305	48.0	11.3					
A&P Group	United Kingdom	Hebburn (Tyne)	Dock No. 1	259	44.0	10.6		*			
A&P Group	United Kingdom	Falmouth	Dock No. 2	253	39.6	11.0		*			
A&P Group	United Kingdom	Falmouth	Dock No. 3	221	26.8	8.6		*			
A&P Group	United Kingdom	Falmouth	Dock No. 4	173	26.2	8.3		*			
A&P Group	United Kingdom	Middlesbrough (Tees)	Dock No. 5	175	22.2	6.9					
A&P Group	United Kingdom	Middlesbrough (Tees)	Dock No. 6	120	17.3	5.9					
Cammell Laird Shiprepairers and Shipbuilders	United Kingdom	Birkenhead	No 4 Dock	125	21.0	8.0		*			
Cammell Laird Shiprepairers and Shipbuilders	United Kingdom	Birkenhead	No 5 Dock	289	42.7	11.5		*			
Cammell Laird Shiprepairers and Shipbuilders	United Kingdom	Birkenhead	No 6 Dock	203	23.3	9.0		*			
Cammell Laird Shiprepairers and Shipbuilders	United Kingdom	Birkenhead	No 7 Dock	251	25.5	10.0		*			
Rosyth Dockyard (Babcock Engineering Services)	United Kingdom	Rosyth	1	310	31.0	10.8	*	*			
Rosyth Dockyard (Babcock Engineering Services)	United Kingdom	Rosyth	2	261	31.0	10.8	*	*			
Rosyth Dockyard (Babcock Engineering Services)	United Kingdom	Rosyth	3	261	31.0	10.8	*	*			
Puget Sound Naval Shipyard	United States of America	Bremerton, Washington (USN)	Dry Dock № 6	351.10	55.0	16.21		*			
Puget Sound Naval Shipyard	United States of America	Bremerton, Washington (USN)	Dry Dock № 5	314.10	45.0	13.77		*			
Puget Sound Naval Shipyard	United States of America	Bremerton, Washington (USN)	Dry Dock № 4	304.14	45.0	13.77		*			
Puget Sound Naval Shipyard	United States of America	Bremerton, Washington (USN)	Dry Dock № 3	282.45	40.0	7.21		*			
Puget Sound Naval Shipyard	United States of America	Bremerton, Washington (USN)	Dry Dock № 2	264.0	44.0	11.63		*			
Puget Sound Naval Shipyard	United States of America	Bremerton, Washington (USN)	Dry Dock № 1	194.74	33.0	9.19		*			
Norfolk Naval Yard	United States of America	Norfolk, Virginia (USN)	Dry Dock № 8	333.0	46.0	14.6		*			
Norfolk Naval Yard	United States of America	Norfolk, Virginia (USN)	Dry Dock № 4	308.0	44.0	13.5		*			
Norfolk Naval Yard	United States of America	Norfolk, Virginia (USN)	Dry Dock № 3	221.0	37.0	10.5		*			
Norfolk Naval Yard	United States of America	Norfolk, Virginia (USN)	Dry Dock № 2	151.3	32.06	11.4		*			
Norfolk Naval Yard	United States of America	Norfolk, Virginia (USN)	Dry Dock № 1	99.2	26.3	7.8		*			
General Dynamics Electric Boat	United States of America	Groton, Connecticut	Graving Dock № 2	205.7	27.7	10.7	*	*		*	
General Dynamics Electric Boat	United States of America	Groton, Connecticut	Graving Dock № 1	170.0	19.8	10.7	*	*			
General Dynamics Electric Boat	United States of America	Groton, Connecticut	Land Level Facility Graving Dock	188.1	29.4	10.7	*	*			
General Dynamics Electric Boat	United States of America	Groton, Connecticut	Floating Dry Dock	187	42.7	13.0	*	*	*		
General Dynamics Electric Boat	United States of America	Groton, Connecticut	Shippingport ARDM-4	129.5	19.8	9.8	*	*	*		
Williamstown Dockyard	Australia	Melbourne	Alfred Graving Dock	126	30	8					
Everett Ship Repair	United States of America	Everett, Washington	Emerald Lifter	67	19	6		*	*		
Everett Ship Repair	United States of America	Everett, Washington	Faithful Servant	150	45	8		*	*		
Everett Ship Repair	United States of America	Everett, Washington	Hercules	250	53	4.5		*	*		
