= Vessel safety survey =

Inspection of ship structure and equipment to assess condition

Vessel safety surveys are inspections of the structure and equipment of a vessel to assess the condition of the surveyed items and check that they comply with legal or classification society requirements for insurance and registration. They may occur at any time when there is reason to suspect that the condition has changed significantly since the previous survey, and the first survey is generally during construction (built under survey) or before first registration. The criteria for acceptance are defined by the licensing or registration authority for a variety of equipment vital to the safe operation of the vessel, such as safety equipment, lifting equipment, hull structure, static stability, ground tackle, propulsion machinery, auxiliary machinery, etc. The SOLAS Convention (International Convention for the Safety of Life at Sea), specifies safety equipment for commercial vessels operating internationally.

Classification societies, such as Lloyd's Register (LR), Bureau Veritas (BV), American Bureau of Shipping (ABS), Det Norske Veritas (DNV), and the Indian Register of Shipping, publish standards for structure, stability and equipment, and maintenance to the standards is needed to secure vessel insurance and so that access to ports is not impeded by local port authorities. These independent businesses likely belong to the International Association of Classification Societies. National authorities such as the US Department of Transport publish safety regulations for the ships registered under their flag. Surveys are also required by marine insurers, as the risk is assumed to be affected by the condition of the vessel. A ship that passes a classification society's survey for a given class of registration is said to be "in class".

A survey or partial survey is often made on a vessel for a potential purchaser, to ensure that the condition is as claimed by the owner. A purchase may be made subject to survey, in which case the extent of the survey may be specified by the purchaser and made by a surveyor nominated by the purchaser or by a marine surveyor from a classification society. A professional survey will include a written report on the items inspected and their condition as assessed by the surveyor.

== Construction and equipment surveys ==
Ships must be surveyed by persons or organisations recognised for this purpose by the ship's flag state, and relevant certificates issued as evidence that the vessel has been designed, constructed, managed and maintained to comply with International Maritime Organization codes and conventions/

The relevant conventions include: SOLAS, 1974, MARPOL 73/78, Tonnage 69, Load Lines, COLREG 72, AFS 2001, BWM 2004 and others.

The certificates and documents are subject to inspection by port state control officers.

=== Structural surveys ===
The extent of the survey depends on the age and type of the vessel. Certificates issued by the classification societies are generally valid for five years. During these five years different controls on the hull are made (there are three damage levels, if the vessel of the damage levels check ups, it will not receive the certificate), and on the engine. To keep a certificate all class requirements are compulsory. The continuous survey hull (CSH) and Continuous survey machinery (CSM) are survey methods for the mooring, anchoring and the propulsion system. The special survey cycle (SS) is an alternative for the CSH and Engine survey (ES) for the CSM. The annual survey (AS) is an inspection of the safety equipment. The annual inspection can be done during a three months period before or the three months after the annual date. There should be two docking surveys (DS) during the five years of certificate validity but it is possible to substitute one by an in-water survey which includes a diving inspection. The intermediate survey (ITSS) is done between the second and the third year, and the scope of this survey depends on the age the vessel. Generally, it is an inspection of ballast more or less detailed. For the chemical or oil carrier surveys are more intensive with the age.

In some circumstances survey of underwater structure and equipment can be done using divers.

=== Safety surveys ===
All merchant cargo vessels must have certificates of compliance for: Ship safety construction, Ship safety equipment, Ship safety radio in to be legally permitted to navigate. Firefighting and life-saving safety exercises should be practiced regularly. The means of evacuation (life raft, life boat, or other marine evacuation system) must be launched once a month and maneuvered once every three months. The GMDSS (global maritime distress on safety system) are controlled by the certificates. The pyrotechnic equipment is not tested on board, but the personal protective equipment such as immersion suits and life jackets are regularly tested during exercises for abandoning ship or at the master's discretion. The firefighting masks and breathing apparatus are tested weekly, but fire hoses are rarely tested inside the ship.

=== Hoist surveys ===
Lifting equipment is often used on a ship to load and unload heavy cargo or other goods. The controls are important. All the surveys are noted in the Register of Ship's Lifting Appliances and Cargo Handling Gear; the inspection is directed by the classification society.

== Surveys in harbour ==
=== Port State control ===
All the vessels are not controlled when they arrive in harbor, it depends on many characteristics (age, flag state, cargo, quality of classification society ...). The Memorandum of understanding (MOU) is a group (area) to avoid this restrictive investigation. The control is determined by « target factor » described above. If the vessel have esthetic deficiencies, the reparation shall be made before the next inspection, but on the other hand the safety equipment must be in order, in case of excessive structural corrosion the vessel is put in detention and cannot navigate. The ship can be banned by the region of the MOU.

=== Cargo ===
Every cargo in ship is controlled before being unloaded. The controls are strict for the chemical and oil carriers and are conducted by an independent surveyor. The ullage is a means to calculate the quantity in the tanks; the sample of content gives an idea of the quality (density and temperature) of liquid in tanks. The surveyor must have records of the three last cargoes to know if there are problems of compatibility (IMDG code). On older vessels, inspections are made more frequently, especially for oil carriers, to avoid disasters such as the Erika as an example). For dry bulk cargo, it is compulsory to fumigate against rats.

== Human survey ==
=== Competence of seamen ===
All merchant vessels are operated by a human crew, so the maintenance and upgrading of skills important. The International Convention on Standards of Training, Certification and Watchkeeping for Seafarers (STCW) created by IMO is a convention which made the rules for training. The STCW certificate is compulsory to navigate in merchant ship as a master and an officer. This certificate guarantees that the holder has the required basic knowledge and skills specified by the safety rules (fire fighting, medical, survival techniques, and management) and navigation (use of a chart etc.).

=== Management ===
The captain runs the vessel with the help of the officers and crew to ensure the safe operation of the vessel. The muster list gives the instruction during the accidents (fire, evacuation). During the first twenty four hours of sailing there are compulsory exercises to familiarize the crew with the safety equipment and procedures on board a ship. One abandon ship drill and one fire drill per month are also required.

The classification societies made the rules to delivered certificates and some societies deliver more easily certificates because the owner of a ship has influence. The IMO is trying to conduct all the surveys and the maintenance. If the Classification societies are more restrictive the owner can change it. All seamen need a good and regular training to become a good seafarer.

== See also ==
- Marine surveyor
- Underwater surveying
