= IWS =

IWS may refer to:

- West Houston Airport (IATA code)
- Individually wrapped slices, in reference to processed cheese
- Integrated Workstation, developed by Convergent Technologies (Unisys)
- International Wool Secretariat
- International Wrestling Syndicate
- In-water survey, a method of surveying the underwater parts of a floating ship
- Irish Water Spaniel
- Steyr IWS 2000, an Austrian semi-automatic rifle
