= Floating dock Muloobinba =

History

Australia
- Name: Muloobinba
- Launched: 1977
- Identification: IMO number: 7708766

History

Namibia
- Name: "Namdock 3"
- Homeport: Walvis Bay

General characteristics
- Type: Floating dry dock
- Length: 205m
- Beam: 33.5m

Floating Dock Muloobinba is a floating dry dock that was owned by the Forgacs Group, and berthed at Carrington, within Newcastle Harbour, Australia. Built in Japan in 1977, Muloobinba arrived in Newcastle in 1978 and was based at the State Dockyard. She was later purchased by the Newcastle Port Corporation, and later Forgacs.

On 21 December 2012 FD Muloobinba left Newcastle. She was initially towed to Batam, Indonesia where she was docked from January through to March 2013 in the ASL dry dock in preparation for her voyage across the Indian Ocean and around the Cape of Good Hope. She was renamed Namdock 3 and eventually arrived in the port of Walvis Bay, Namibia. Namdock 3 is now owned and operated by Elgin Brown Hamer.
