= HSG Sungdong =

South Korean shipbuilding company

Sungdong Group (성동조선), now HSG Sungdong, is a South Korean shipbuilding company with four operating units. The company was established in 2001 by Jung Hong Jun, originally a welding specialist who obtained more than 80 patents personally. Sungdong Shipyard was initially commenced its shipbuilding business as ship block manufacturing company to Samsung Heavy Industry. After the big success of block builder, Mr. Jung Hong Jun, Founder, introduced Gripper Translift System to shipbuilding technology, and this technology enables the shipbuilding without dry-dock building. Its first order was 8 units of 93,000 DWT Bulk Carrier from Greek Shipping Company, Marmaras Navigation in August 2004. After its first delivery in January 2007, Sungdong has delivered more than 250 vessels without dry-dock until 2018. Considering the Drydocking system taking the 24 hours to launching the ship, Gripper Translift System takes only 4 hours for launching the vessel.

In 2006, Sungdong Shipbuilding joined the global list of the top 20 shipyards, by opening their own shipbuilding facility.

In April 2018, Sungdong entered court receivership. In 2019, the company entered an agreement to be acquired by HSG Heavy Industries, with a shift from shipbuilding to hull block assembly at the facility. In March 2020, according to the company's SEC filing, a consortium of investors led by HSG Heavy Industries Co., Ltd. and Curious Partners Investment, which formed the HSG-Curious Consortium, acquired Sungdong Shipbuilding & Marine Engineering for 200 billion won ($US170 million). In April 2020, the yard became HSG Sungdong Shipbuilding.

In 2023, HSG Sungdong won a contract from Danish utility Ørsted to supply it with offshore wind power substructures for its planned power complex in Changhua, Taiwan.
