= Dry dock =

Basin drained to allow work on a vessel

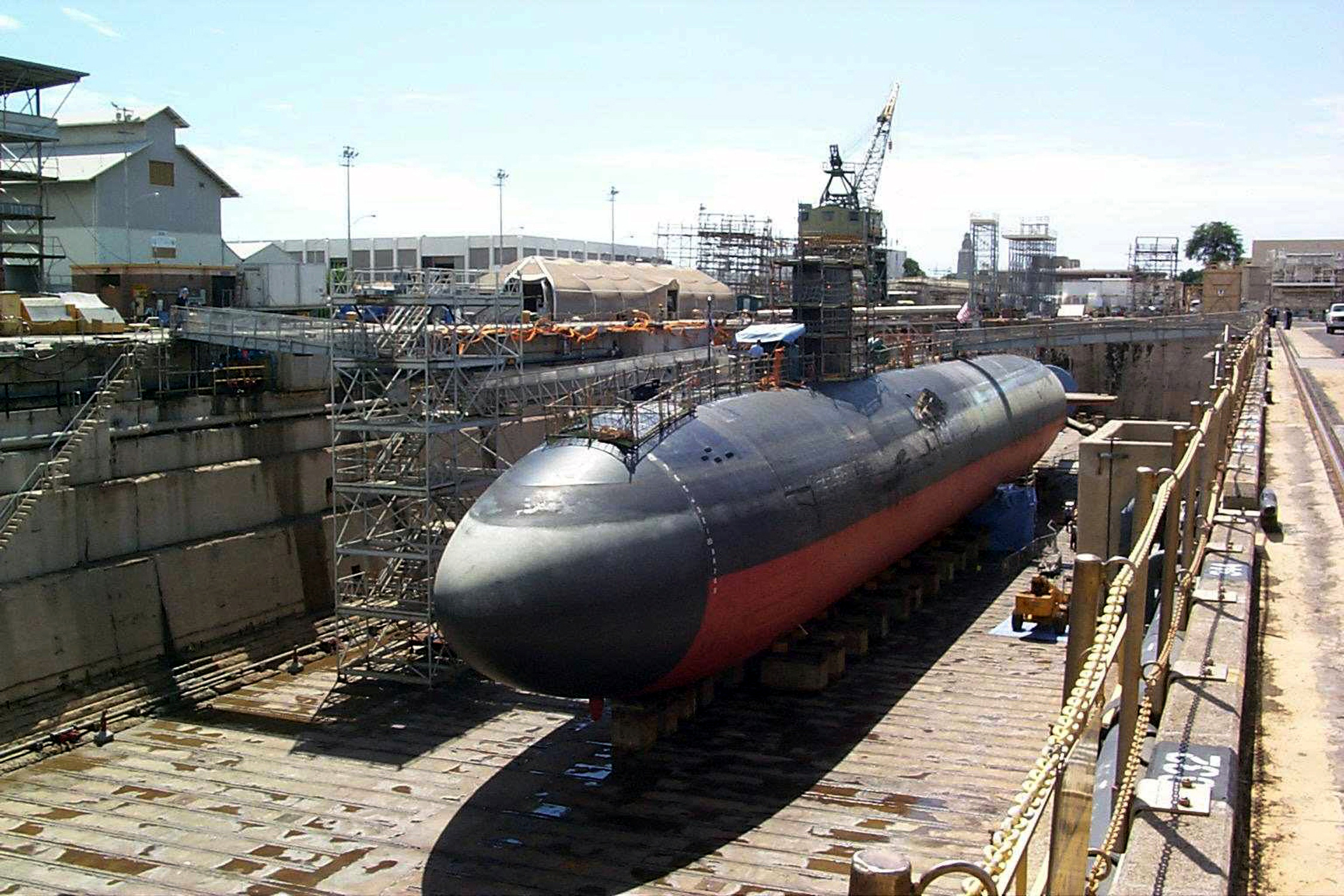
U.S. Navy submarine USS Greeneville in a graving dock

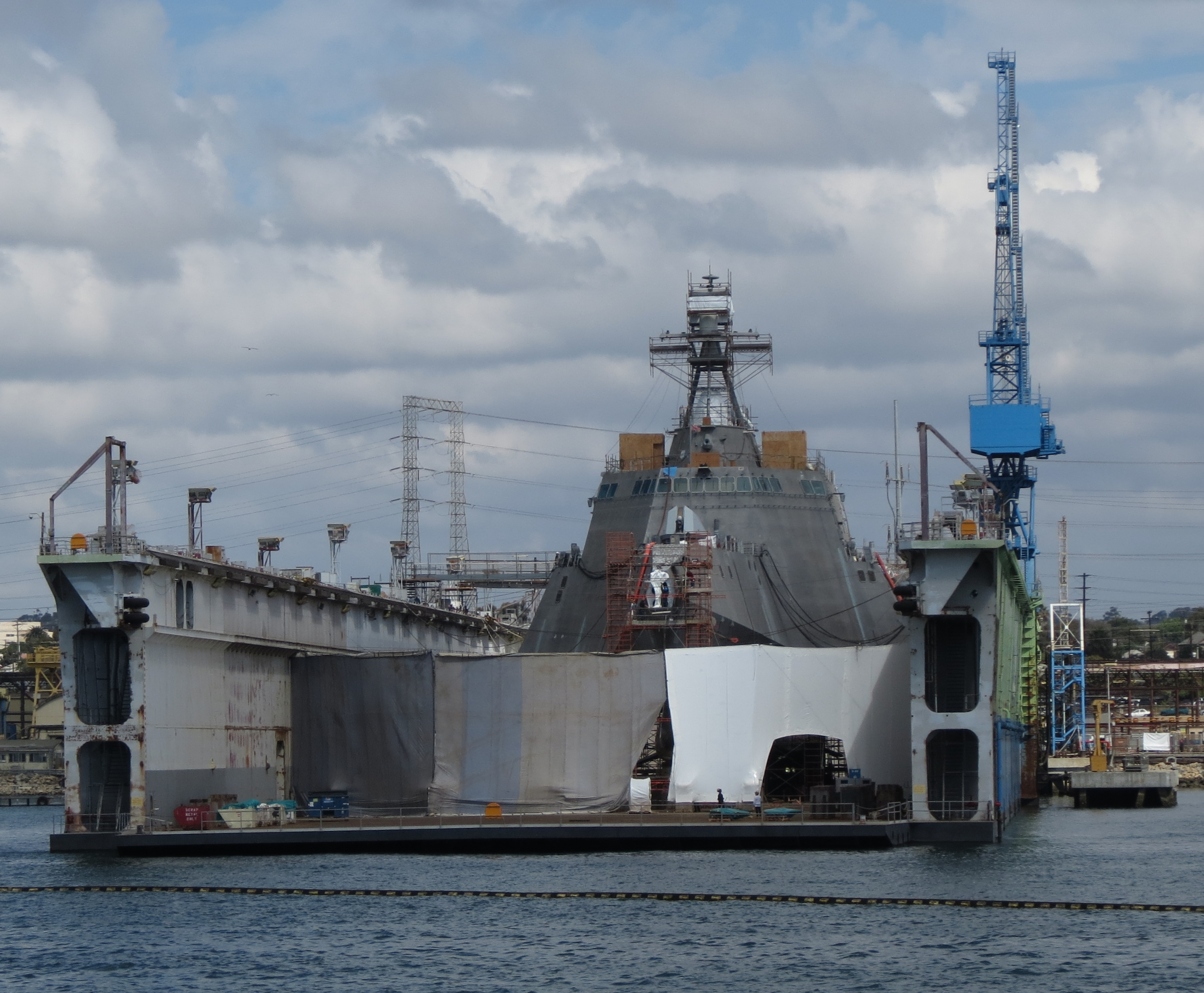
A US Navy littoral combat ship in a floating drydock, NASSCO 2012

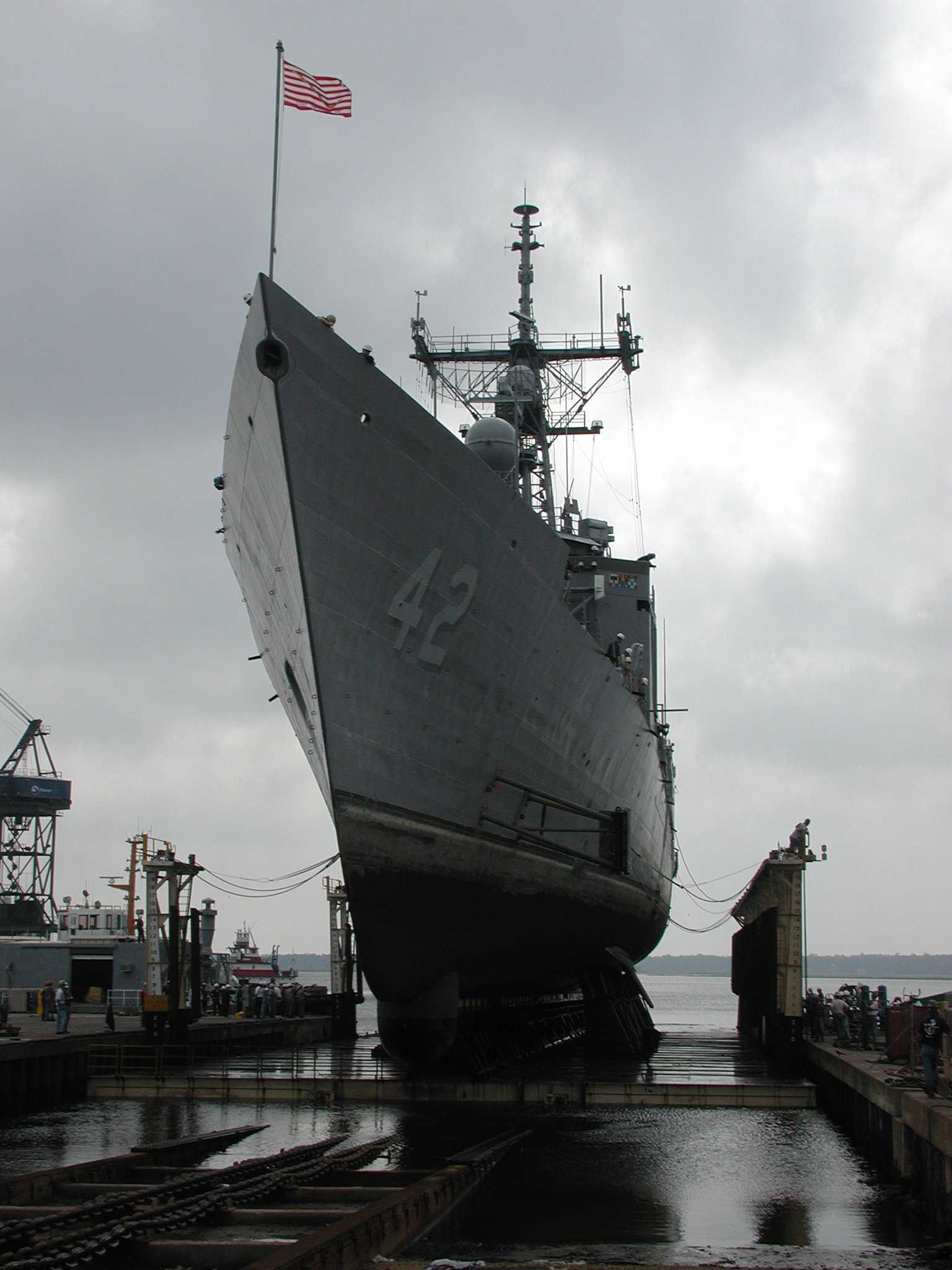
A US Navy frigate on a marine railway drydock

A dry dock (sometimes drydock or dry-dock) is used for the construction, maintenance, and repair of ships, boats, and other watercraft. There are several basic types of dry docks:

- Graving or basin docks
- Floating dry docks
- Marine railways
- Vertical lifts
- Marine travel lifts

== History ==
=== Phoenician empire ===
In fifth-century BC at the Phoenician port city of Kition—today's Larnaca, Cyprus—there were covered slipways (neoria) opening onto the cothon (an artificial basin linked to the sea). These are interpreted as having the function of dry docks. The important naval base at Carthage had as many as 170–180 timber-and-stone "drydock ramps", again opening onto the cothon, completed in the second century BC. The Roman fleet took over the facility after the defeat of the Carthage in 146 BC.

=== Ptolemaic Egypt ===
The Greek author Athenaeus of Naucratis (V 204c-d) reports something that may have been a dry dock in Ptolemaic Egypt in the reign of Ptolemy IV Philopator (221-204 BC) on the occasion of the launch of the enormous Tessarakonteres rowing ship. However this is disputed by Joseph Needham, who states that a survey by Goodchild and Forbes does not substantiate its existence.

But after that a Phoenician devised a new method of launching it (the Tessarakonteres), having dug a trench under it, equal to the ship itself in length, which he dug close to the harbour. And in the trench he built props of solid stone five cubits deep, and across them he laid beams crosswise, running the laces whole width of the trench, at four cubits' distance from one another; and then making a channel from the sea he filled all the space which he had excavated with water, out of which he easily brought the ship by the aid of whatever men happened to be at hand; then closing the entrance which had been originally made, he drained the water off again by means of engines (organois); and when this had been done the vessel rested securely on the before-mentioned cross-beams.

It has been calculated that a dock for a vessel of such a size might have had a volume of 750,000 gallons of water.

=== Song dynasty China ===
The use of dry docks in China goes at least as far back as the 10th century A.D. In 1088, Song dynasty scientist and statesman Shen Kuo (1031–1095) wrote in his Dream Pool Essays:

At the beginning of the dynasty (c. +965) the two Che provinces (now Chekiang and southern Chiangsu) presented (to the throne) two dragon ships each more than 200 ft. in length. The upper works included several decks with palatial cabins and saloons, containing thrones and couches all ready for imperial tours of inspection. After many years, their hulls decayed and needed repairs, but the work was impossible as long as they were afloat. So in the Hsi-Ning reign period (+1068 to +1077) a palace official Huang Huai-Hsin suggested a plan. A large basin was excavated at the north end of the Chin-ming Lake capable of containing the dragon ships, and in it heavy crosswise beams were laid down upon a foundation of pillars. Then (a breach was made) so that the basin quickly filled with water, after which the ships were towed in above the beams. Then (breach now being closed) the water was pumped out by wheels so that the ships rested quite in the air. When the repairs were complete, the water was let in again, so that the ships were afloat once more (and could leave the dock). Finally the beams and pillars were taken away, and the whole basin covered over with a great roof so as to form a hangar in which the ships could be protected from the elements and avoid the damage caused by undue exposure.

=== Renaissance Europe ===
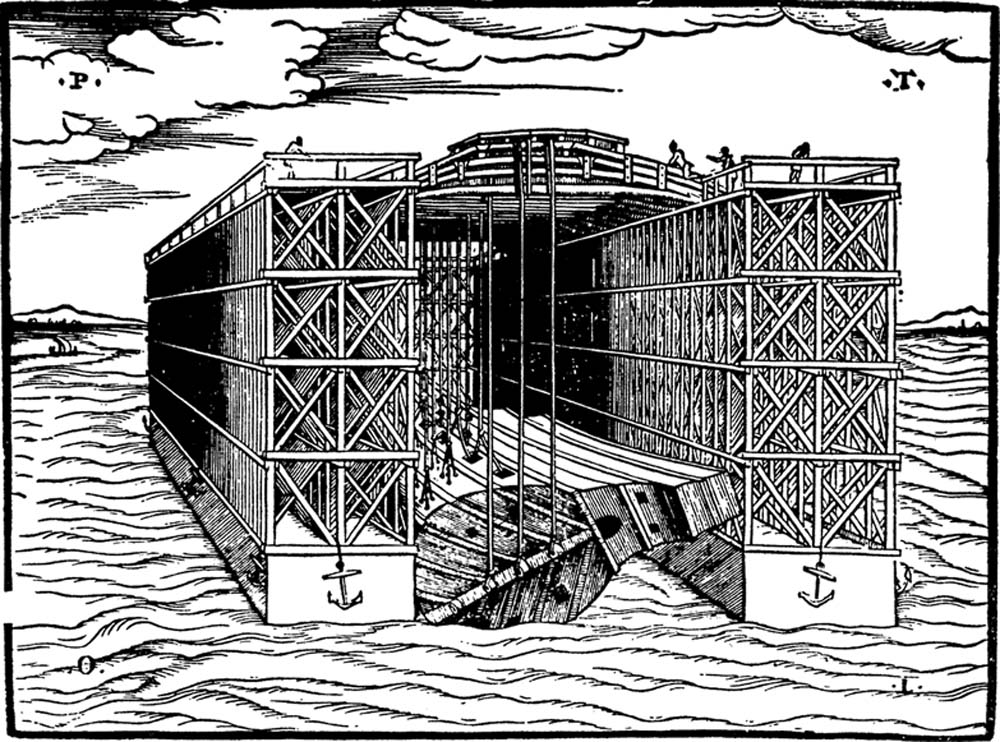
Floating Dock. Woodcut from Venice (1560)

Before the 15th century, when the hull below the waterline needed attention, careening was practised: at high tide the vessel was floated over a beach of hard sand and allowed to rest on one side when the tide receded. An account of 1434 described how a site near Southampton with a bottom of soft mud was selected for the warship Grace Dieu, so that the hull would bed itself in and remain upright at low tide. A timber, brushwood and clay wall was then built up around the hull. The first early modern purpose-built European and oldest surviving dry dock still in use was commissioned by Henry VII of England at HMNB Portsmouth in 1495. This was a timber-lined excavation, with the seaward end closed off by a temporary revetted bank of rock and clay that had to be dug away by hand (an operation taking typically 29 days, working night and day to accord with the tides) to allow the passage of a ship. Emptying was by a pump, possibly in the form of a bucket-chain powered by horses. This dry dock currently holds First World War monitor HMS M33.

Possibly the earliest description of a floating dock comes from a small Italian book printed in Venice in 1560, called Descrittione dell'artifitiosa machina. In the booklet, an unknown author asks for the privilege of using a new method for the salvaging of a grounded ship and then proceeds to describe and illustrate his approach. The included woodcut shows a ship flanked by two large floating trestles, forming a roof above the vessel. The ship is pulled in an upright position by a number of ropes attached to the superstructure.

=== Modern era ===
In 1866 a floating dry dock HM Dry Dock Bermuda was constructed & sailed across the Atlantic to Bermuda from North Woolwich, England. It arrived in 1869 & served until 1906. It was replaced by a larger dry dock built in 1901, Admiralty Floating Dock #1. There are remnants of it still visible over 100 years later.

The Saint-Nazaire's Chantiers de l'Atlantique owns one of the biggest in the world: 1,200 by 60 metres (3,940 ft × 200 ft). The Alfredo da Silva Dry Dock in Almada, Portugal, was closed in 2000. The largest roofed dry dock is at the German Meyer Werft Shipyard in Papenburg, Germany, it is 504 m long, 125 m wide and stands 75 m tall.

Harland and Wolff Heavy Industries in Belfast, Northern Ireland, is the site of a large dry dock 556 by 93 metres (1,824 ft × 305 ft). The massive cranes are named after the Biblical figures Samson and Goliath.

Dry Dock 12 at Newport News Shipbuilding at 662 by 76 metres (2,172 ft × 249 ft) is the largest dry dock in the United States. The largest floating-dock in North America is named The Vigorous. It is operated by Vigor Industries in Portland, OR, in the Swan Island industrial area along the Willamette River.

== Types ==
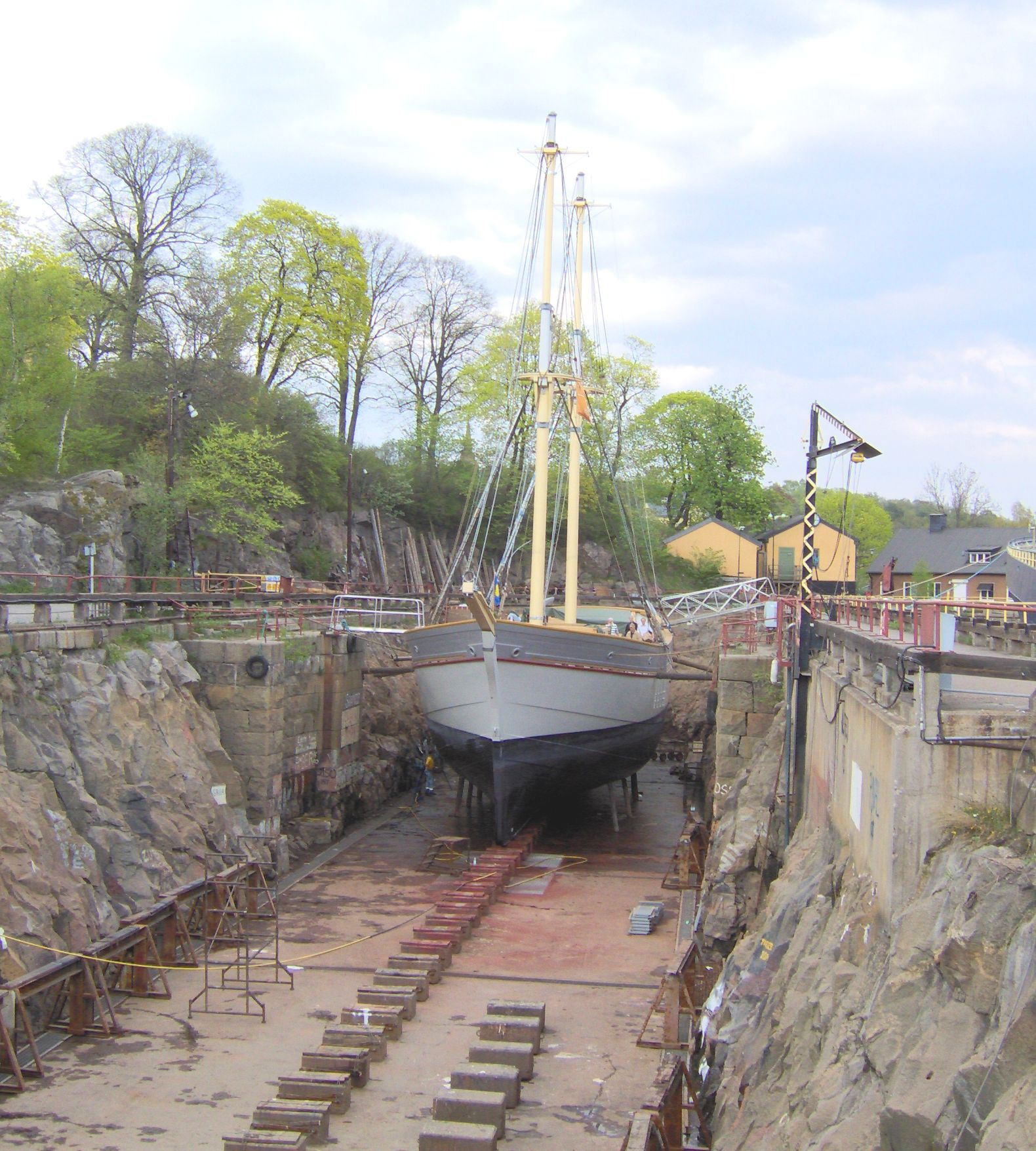
The Stockholm brig "Tre Kronor" in one of the historical dry docks on the island Beckholmen in central Stockholm

=== Graving ===
A graving dock is the traditional form of dry dock. It is a narrow basin, usually made of earthen berms and concrete, closed by gates or a caisson. A vessel is floated in with the gates open, then the gates are closed and the water is pumped out, leaving the craft supported on blocks.

The keel blocks as well as the bilge block are placed on the floor of the dock in accordance with the "docking plan" of the ship. Routine use of dry docks is for the "graving" of ships' hulls, which means cleaning, removal of barnacles and rust, and re-painting.

Some fine-tuning of the ship's position can be done by divers while there is still some water left to manoeuvre the vessel. It is extremely important that supporting blocks conform to the structural members so that the ship is not damaged when its weight is supported by the blocks. Some anti-submarine warfare warships have sonar domes protruding beneath the hull, requiring the hull to be supported several metres above the bottom of the dry dock, or depressions built into the floor of the dock, to accommodate the protrusions.

Once the remainder of the water is pumped out, the ship can be freely inspected or serviced. When work on the ship is finished, the gates are opened to allow water in, and the ship is carefully refloated.

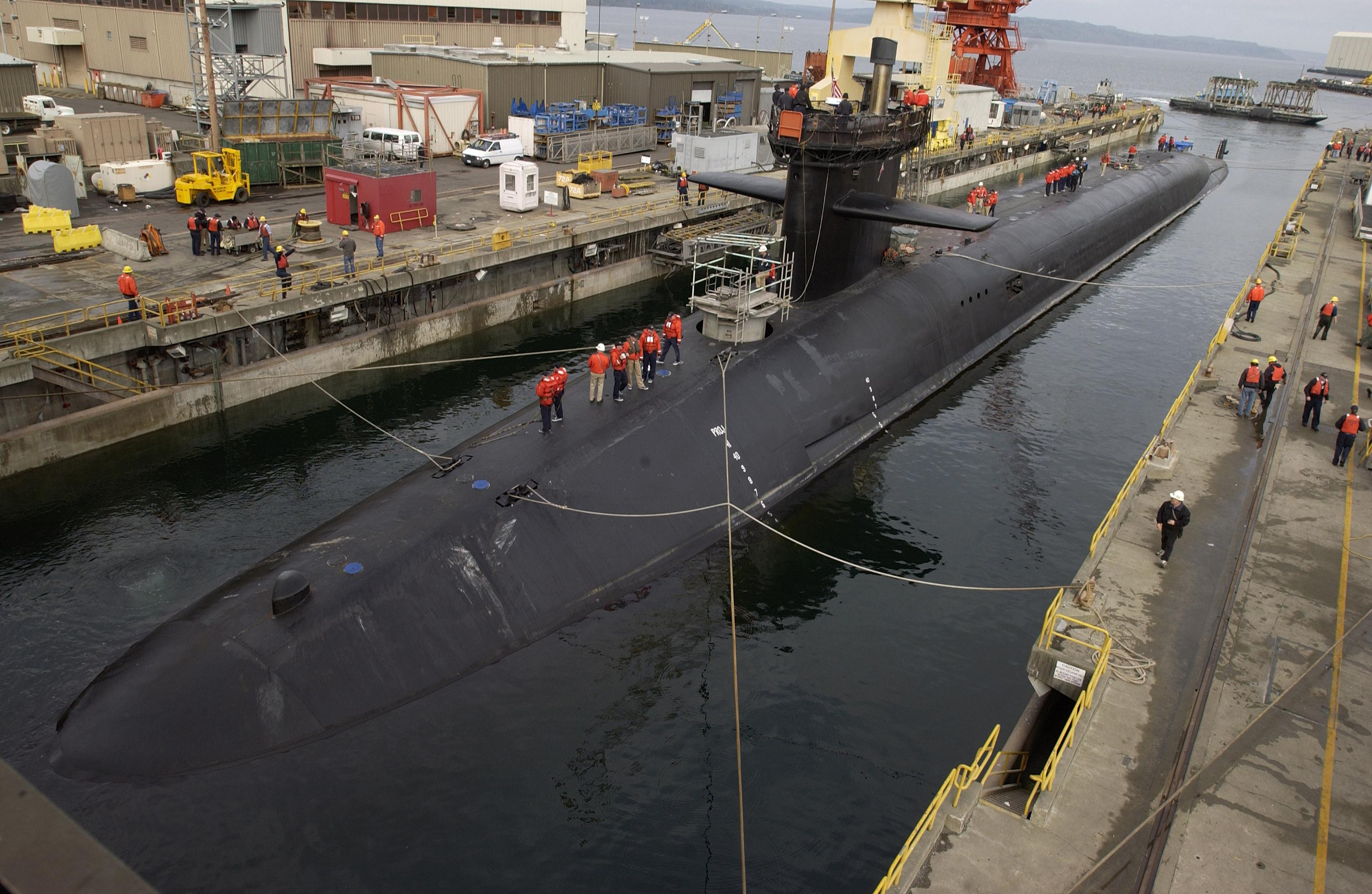
U.S. Navy ballistic missile submarine USS Michigan inside a flooded dry dock

Modern graving docks are box-shaped, to accommodate newer, boxier ships, whereas old dry docks are often shaped like the ships expected to dock there. This shaping was advantageous because such a dock was easier to build, it was easier to side-support the ships, and less water had to be pumped away.

Dry docks used for building naval vessels may occasionally be built with a roof, to prevent spy satellites from taking pictures of the dry dock and any vessels that may be in it. During World War II, the German Kriegsmarine used fortified dry docks to protect its submarines from Allied air raids (see submarine pen).

An advantage of covered dry docks is that work can take place in any weather; this is frequently used by modern shipyards for construction especially of complex, high-value vessels like cruise ships, where delays would incur a high cost.

=== Floating ===
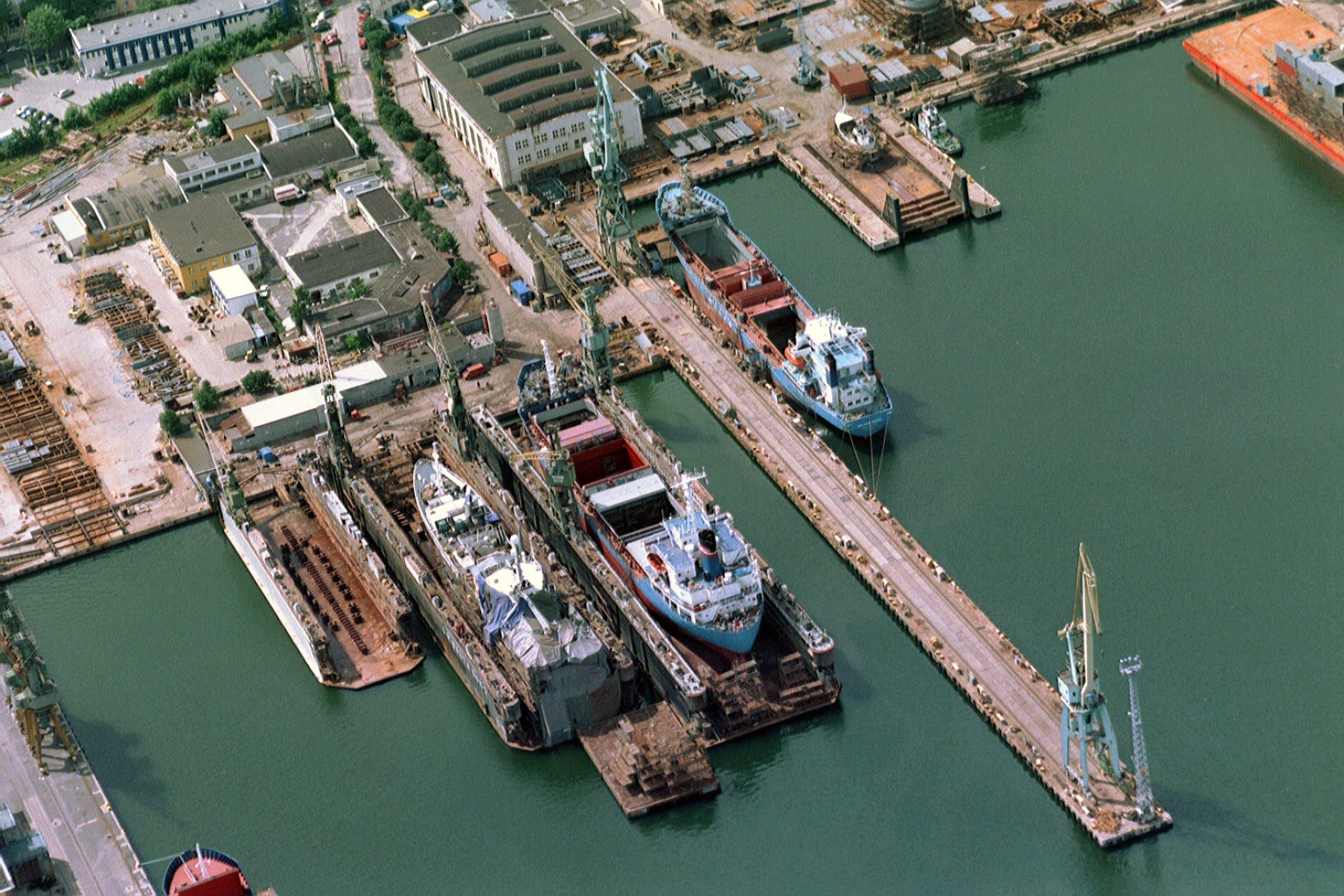
Floating docks, Gdynia, Poland

A floating dry dock is a type of pontoon for dry docking ships, possessing floodable buoyancy chambers and a U-shaped cross-section. The walls are used to give the dry dock stability when the floor or deck is below the surface of the water. When valves are opened, the chambers fill with water, causing the dry dock to float lower in the water. The deck becomes submerged and this allows a ship to be moved into position inside. When the water is pumped out of the chambers, the dry dock rises and the ship is lifted out of the water on the rising deck, allowing work to proceed on the ship's hull.

A large floating dry dock involves multiple rectangular sections. These sections can be combined to handle ships of various lengths, and the sections themselves can come in different dimensions. Each section contains its own equipment for emptying the ballast and to provide the required services, and the addition of a bow section can facilitate the towing of the dry dock once assembled. For smaller boats, one-piece floating dry docks can be constructed or converted out of an existing obsolete barge, potentially coming with their own bow and steering mechanism.

Shipyards operate floating dry docks as one method for hauling or docking vessels. Floating drydocks are important in locations where porous ground prevents the use of conventional drydocks, such as at the Royal Naval Dockyard on the limestone archipelago of Bermuda. Another advantage of floating dry docks is that they can be moved to wherever they are needed and can also be sold second-hand. During World War II, the U.S. Navy used such auxiliary floating drydocks extensively to provide maintenance in remote locations. Two examples of these were the 1,000-foot AFDB-1 and the 850-foot AFDB-3. The latter, an Advance Base Sectional Dock which saw action in Guam, was mothballed near Norfolk, Virginia, and was eventually towed to Portland, Maine, to become part of Bath Iron Works' repair facilities.

A downside of floating dry docks is that unscheduled sinkings and off-design dives may take place, as with the Russian dock PD-50 in 2018.

The "Hughes Mining Barge", or HMB-1, is a covered, floating drydock that is also submersible to support the secret transfer of a mechanical lifting device underneath the Glomar Explorer ship, as well as the development of the Sea Shadow stealth ship.

The Great Balance Dock, built in New York City in 1854, was the largest floating drydock in the world when it was launched. It was 325 feet (99 m) long and could lift 8,000 tons, accommodating the largest ships of its day.

=== Alternative dry dock systems ===
Apart from graving docks and floating dry docks, ships can also be dry docked and launched by:

- Marine railway — For repair of larger ships up to about 3000 tons ship weight
- Shiplift — For repair as well as for new-building. From 800 to 25000 ton ship-weight
- Slipway, patent slip — For repair of smaller boats and the new-building launch of larger vessels

== Other uses ==
Some dry docks are used during the construction of bridges, dams, and other large objects. For example, the dry dock on the artificial island of Neeltje-Jans was used for the construction of the Oosterscheldekering, a large dam in the Netherlands that consists of 65 concrete pillars weighing 18,000 tonnes each. The pillars were constructed in a drydock and towed to their final place on the seabed.

A dry dock may also be used for the prefabrication of the elements of an immersed tube tunnel, before they are floated into position, as was done with Boston's Silver Line.

== Gallery ==
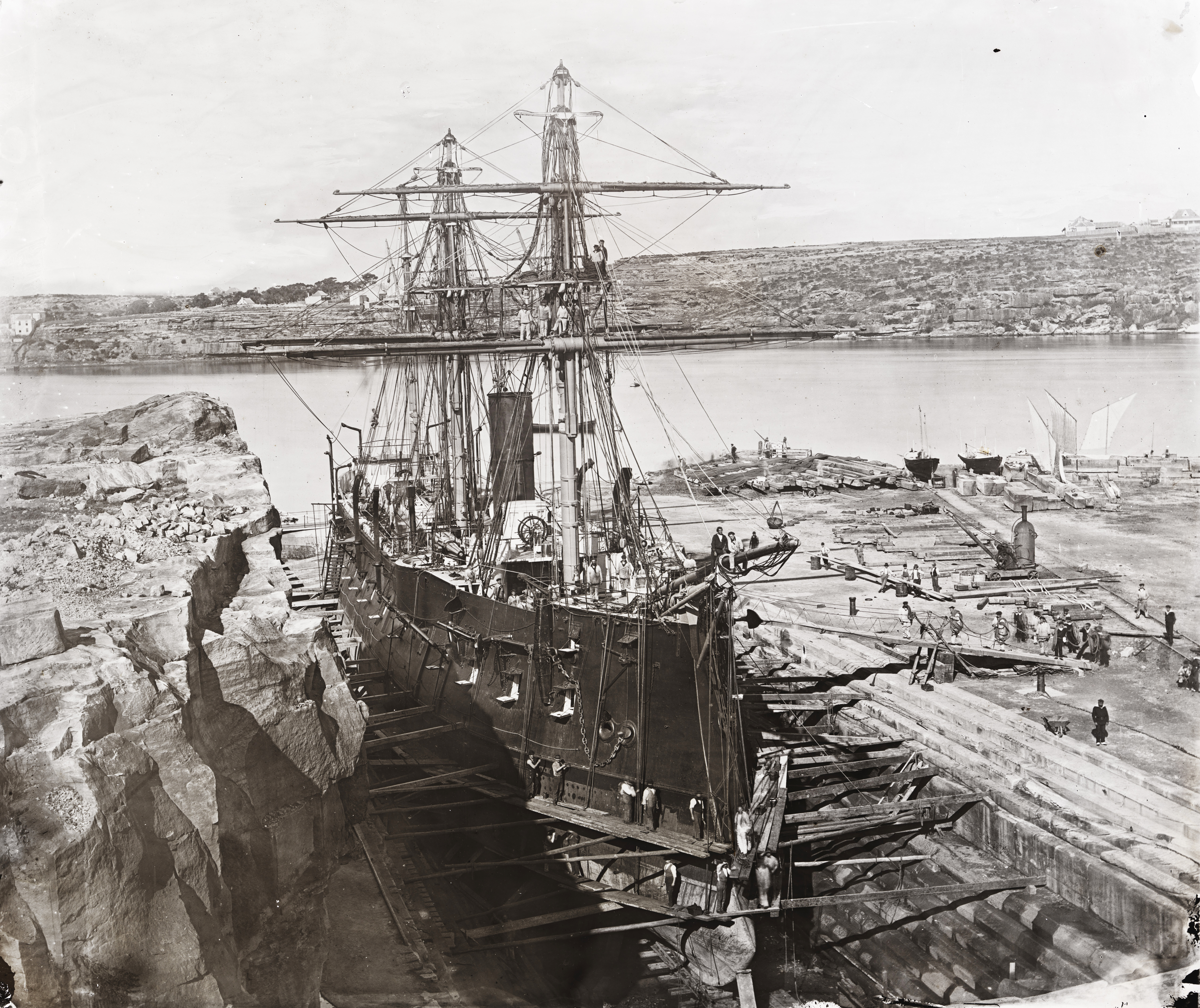
French warship 'Atalante', Fitzroy Dock, Sydney, 1873

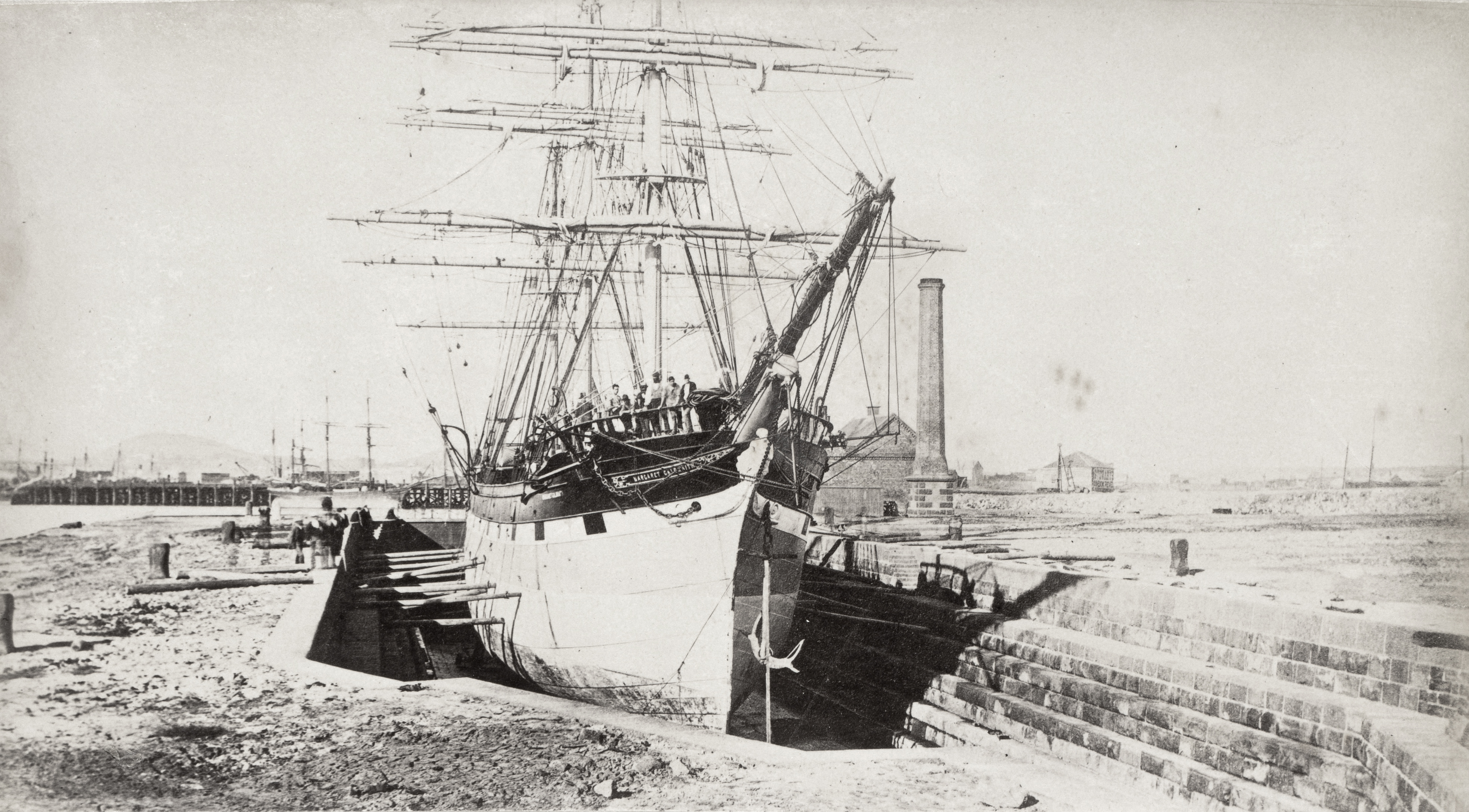
Auckland graving dock, Auckland, New Zealand, 1878

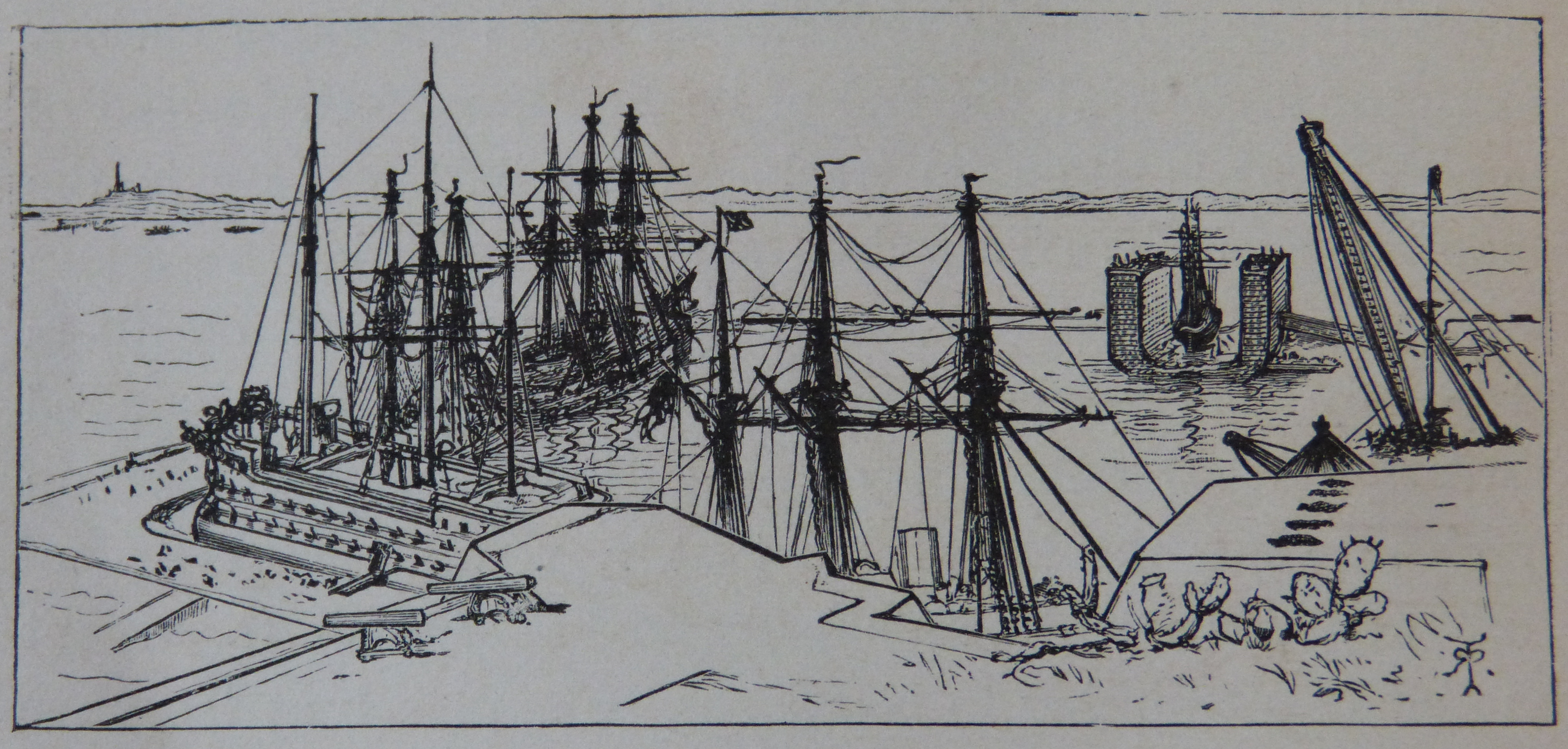
The Royal Naval Dockyard, Bermuda as seen by Anna Brassey in 1883, with its floating drydock in the background

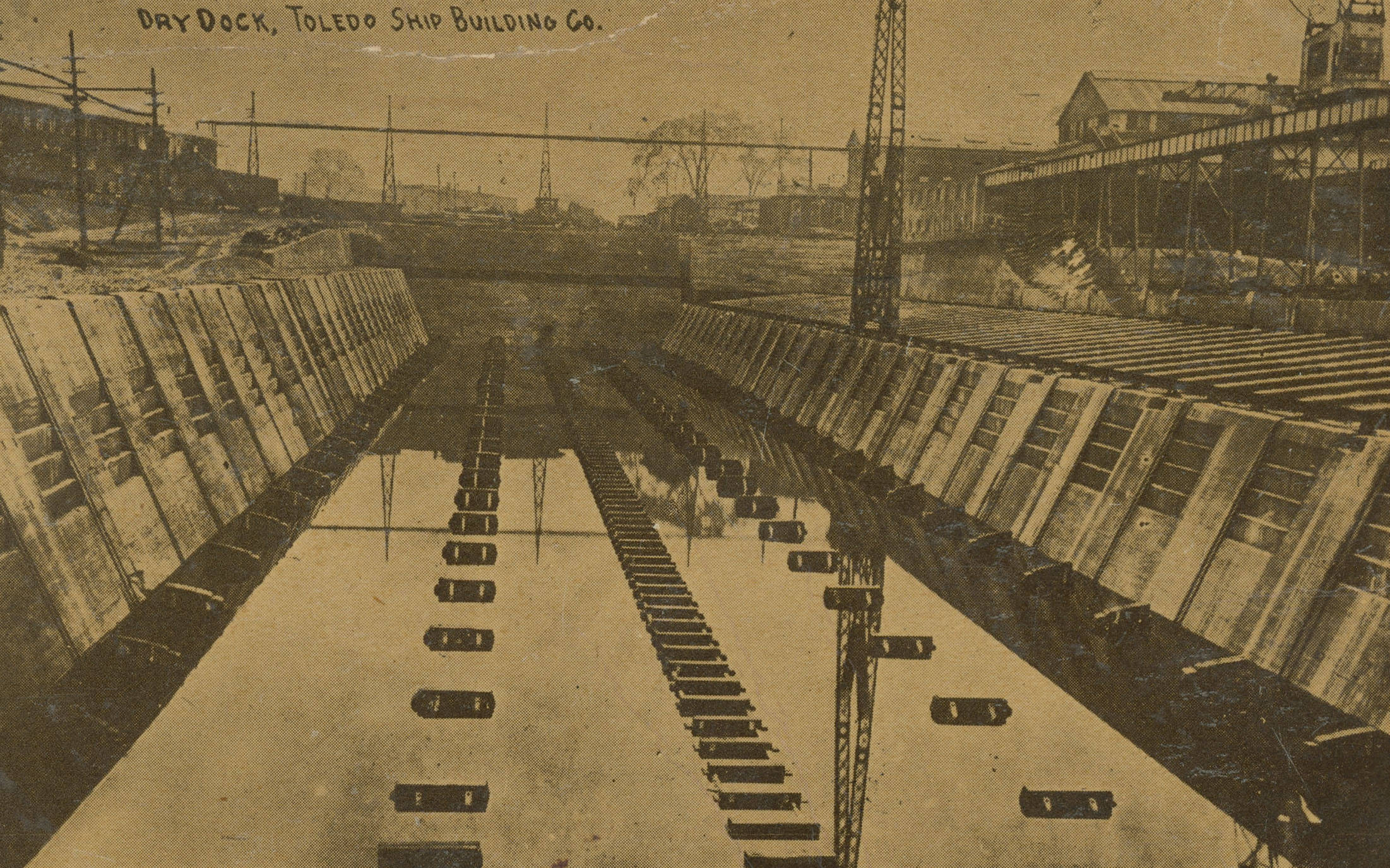
Dry Dock, Toledo Ship Building Company, Toledo, Ohio, 1912

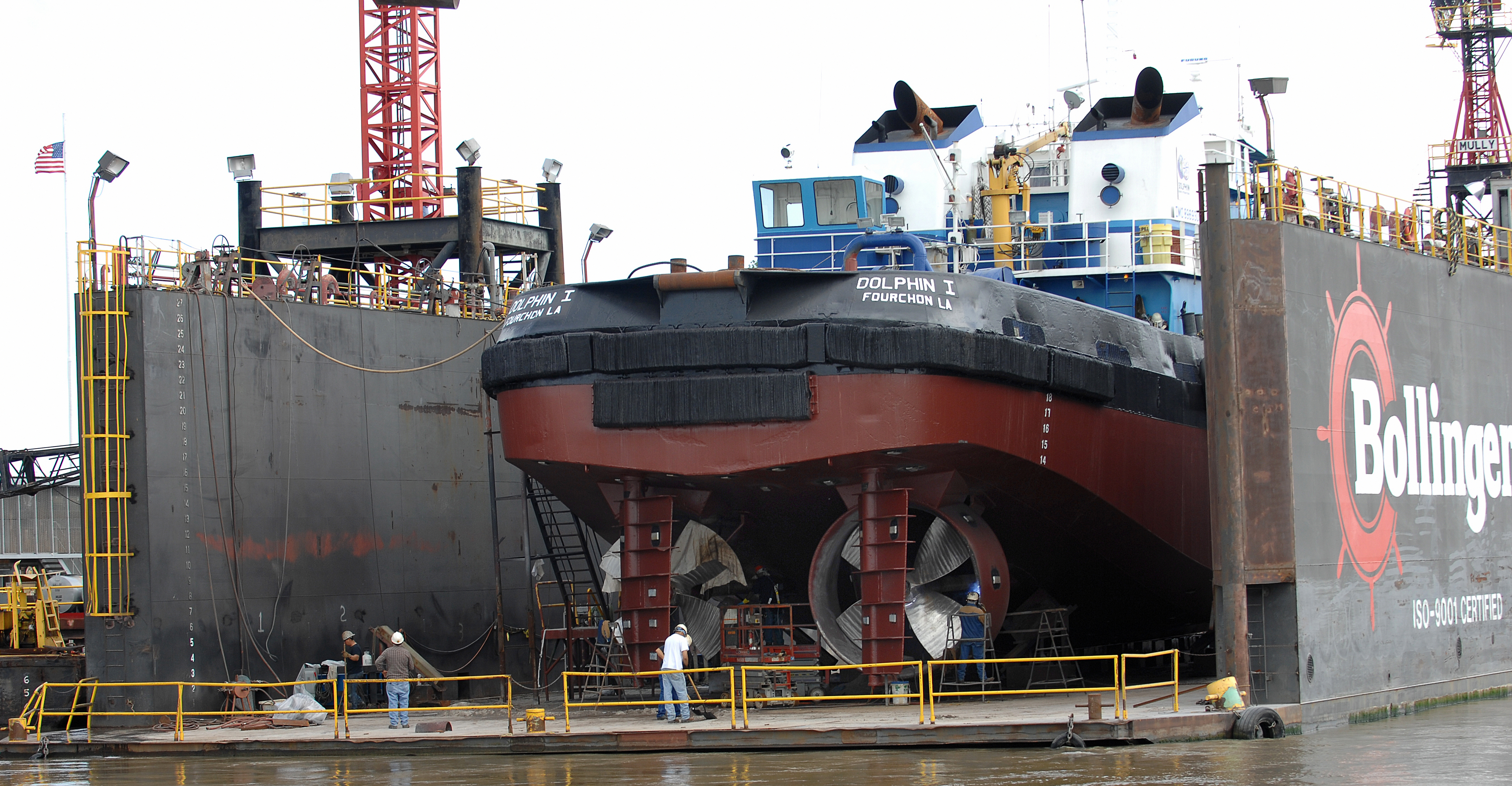
Towboat Dolphin I in Bollinger Shipyards floating Drydock #2 on the Mississippi River in Algiers, New Orleans, Louisiana

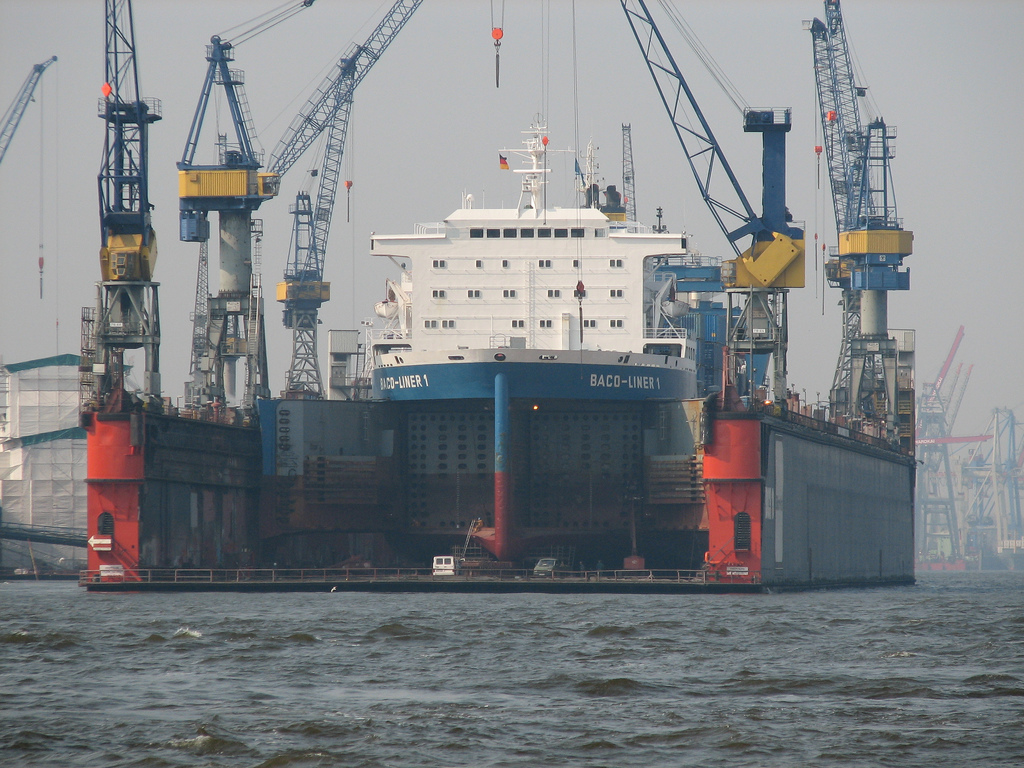
Blohm + Voss Dock 10, at the Port of Hamburg Germany

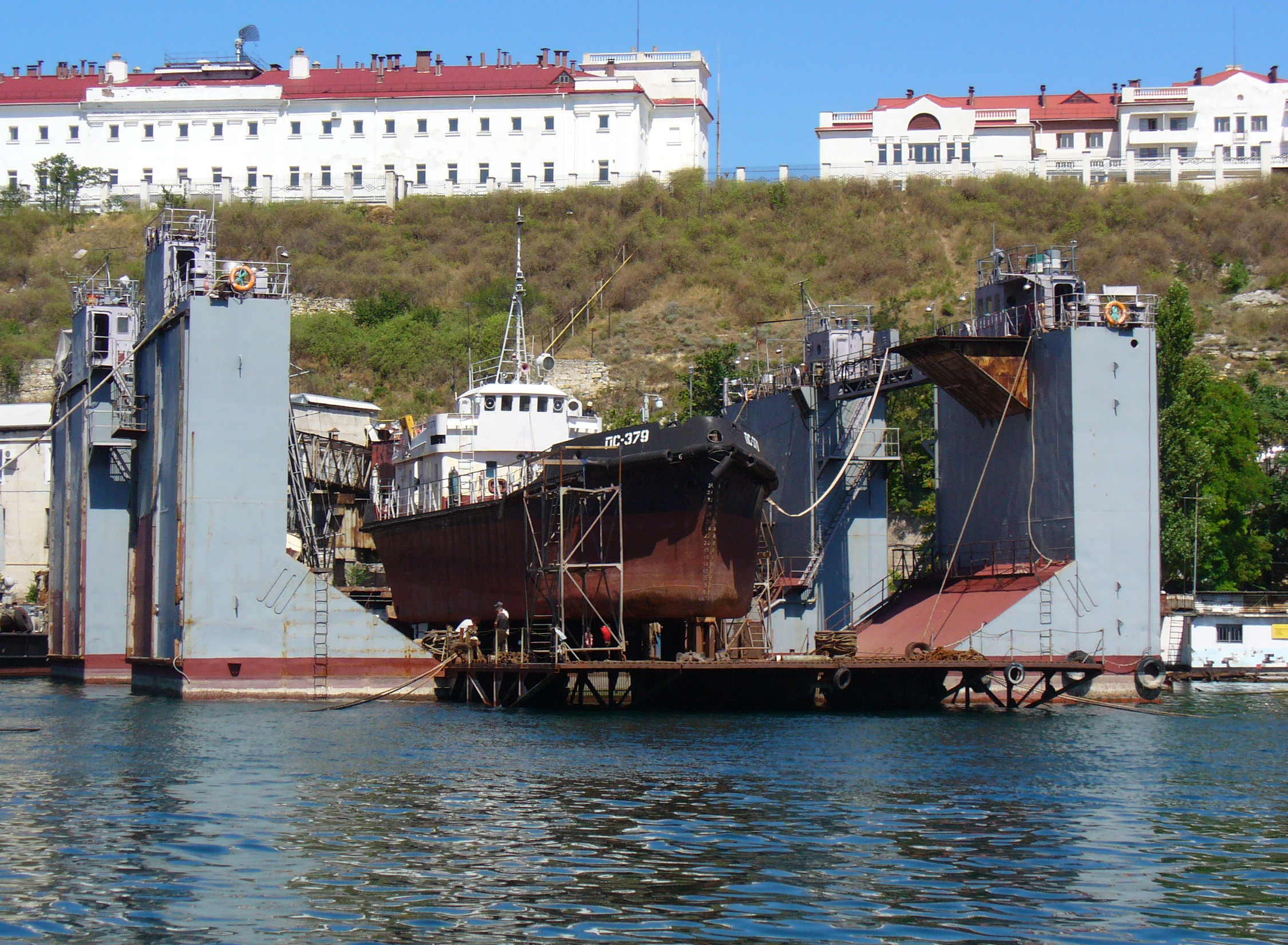
Floating dry dock located in Sevastopol

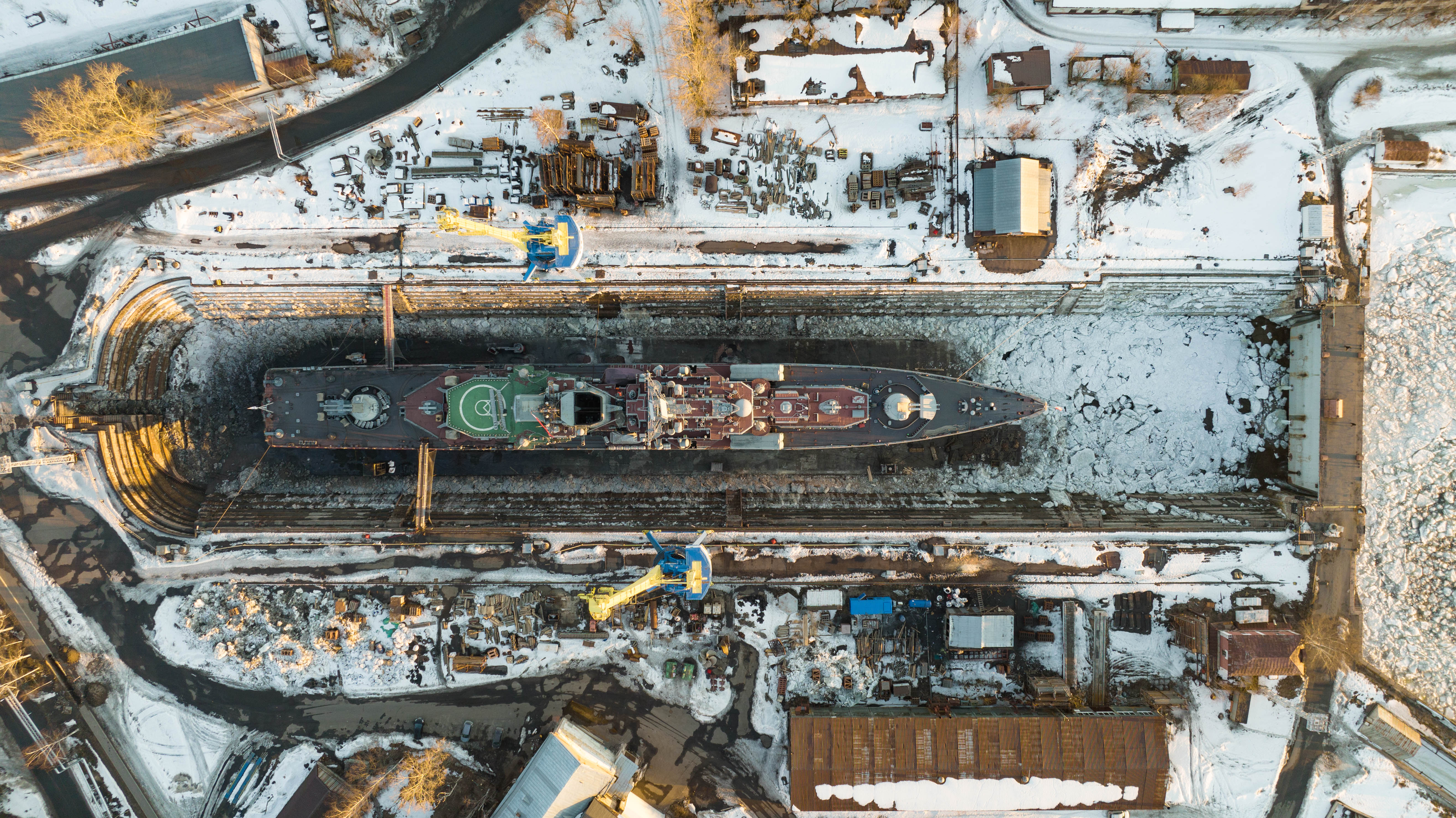
Alekseevsky dry dock at Kronstadt shipyard, Saint Petersburg, Russia

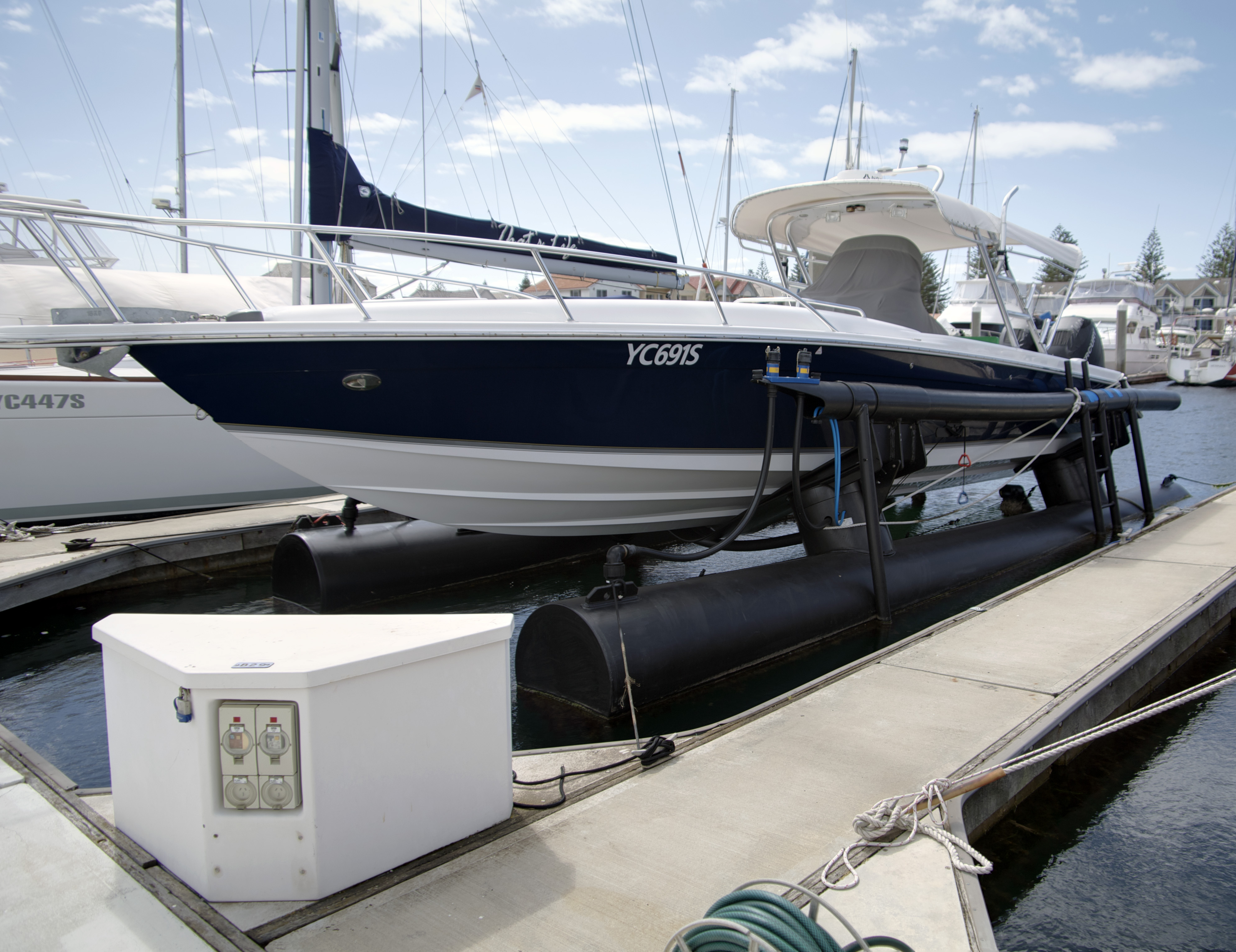
A boat lift is a light duty form of dry dock which keeps small boats out of the water while not in use

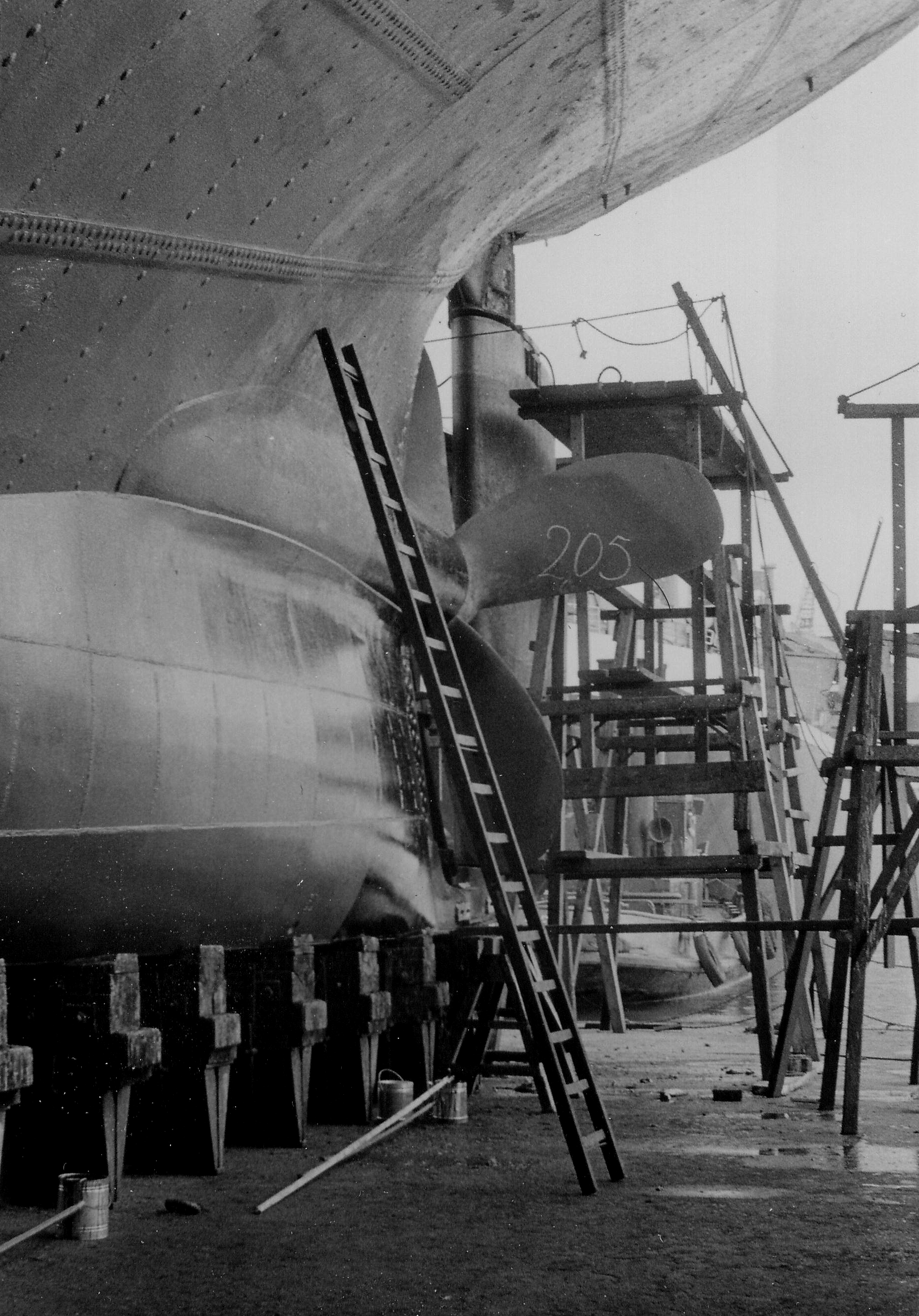
Ship in the floating dry dock of Bremer Vulkan shipyard during an inspection of its propeller and rudder

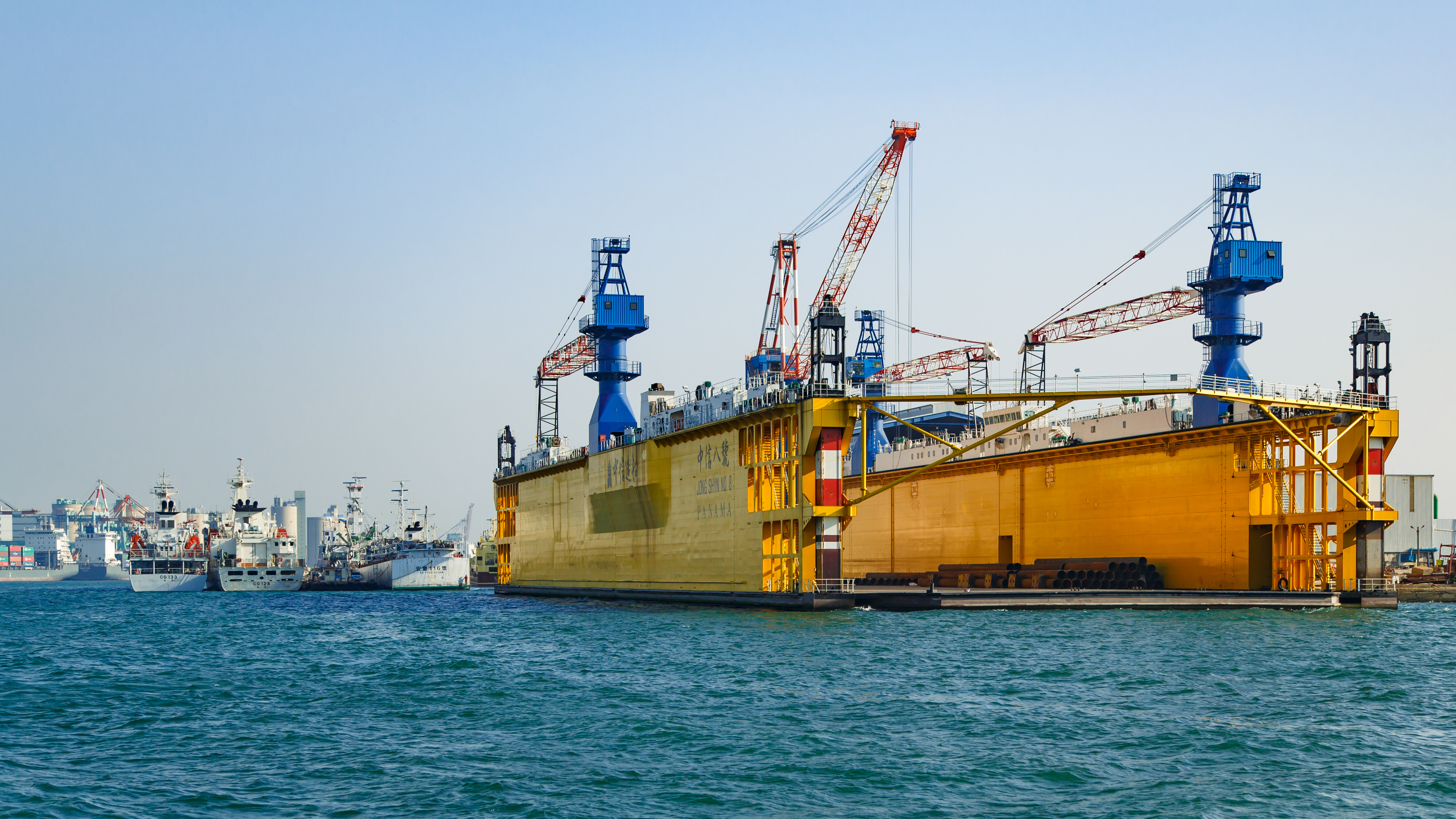
Floating dry dock Jong Shyn No. 8 in Kaohsiung Harbour, Taiwan

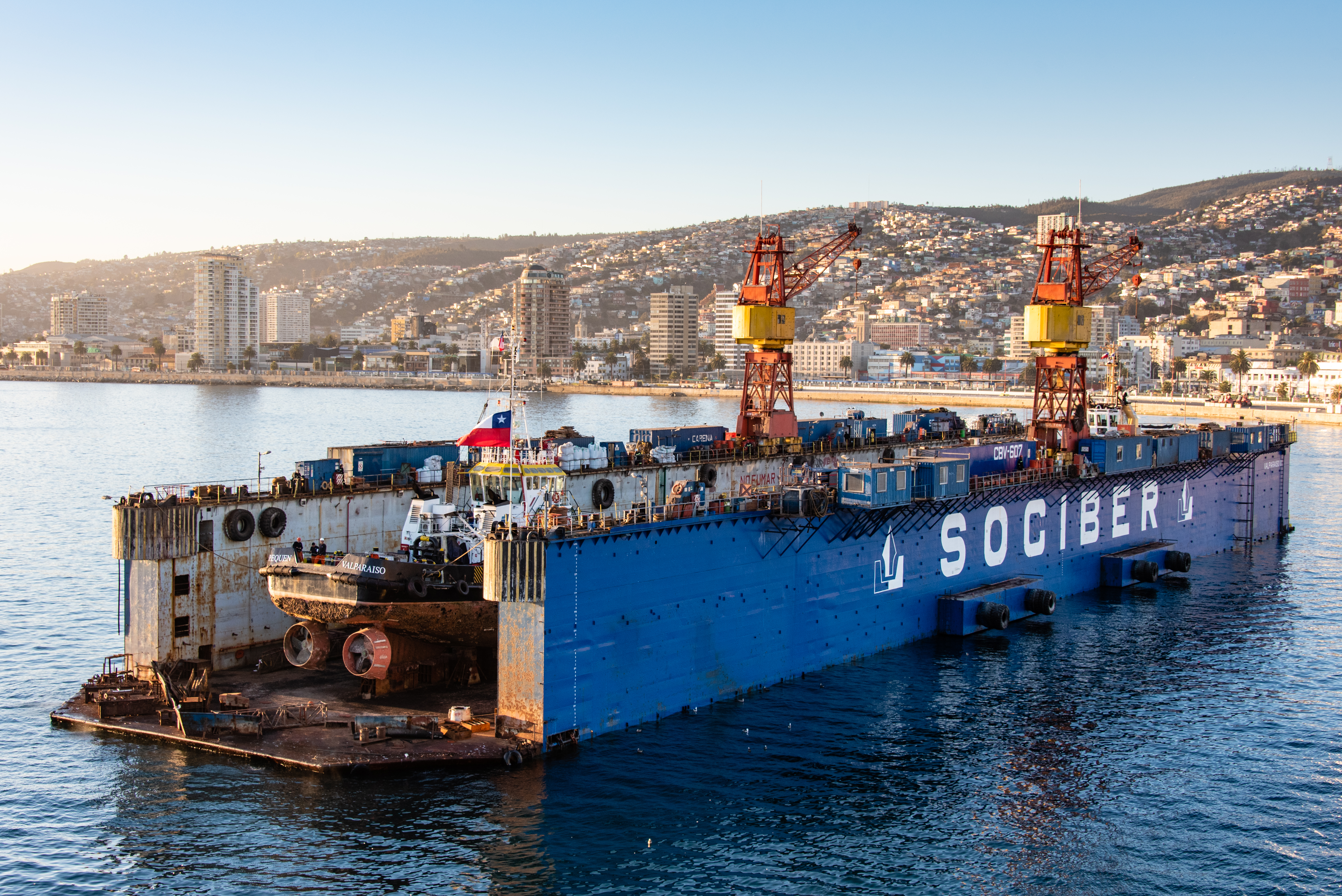
SOCIBER floating drydock, Valparaiso III with tugboat Pequen, being worked on in the cradle, in Valparaiso, Chile

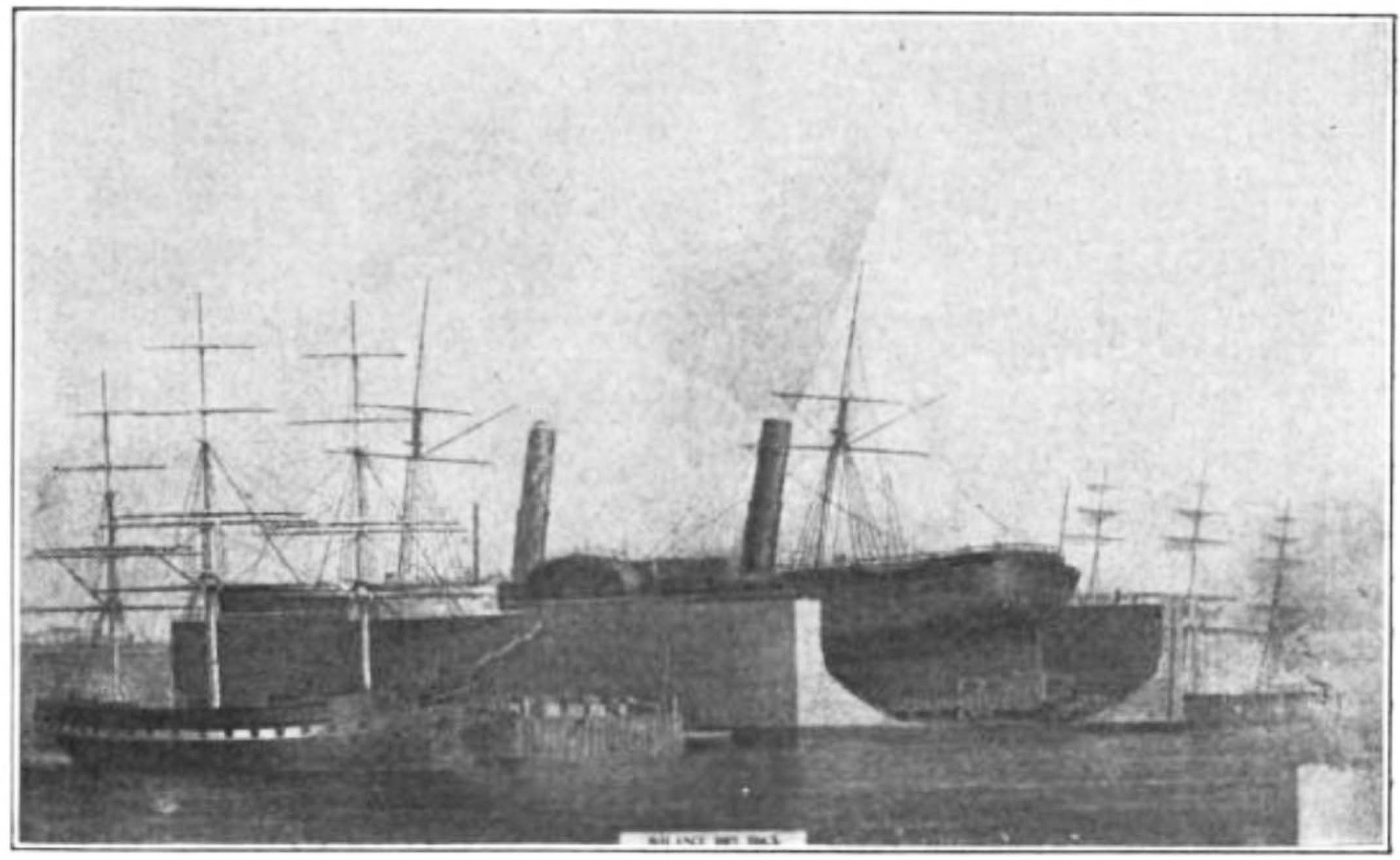
The Great Balance Dock with the steamer Adriatic aboard, c. 1860

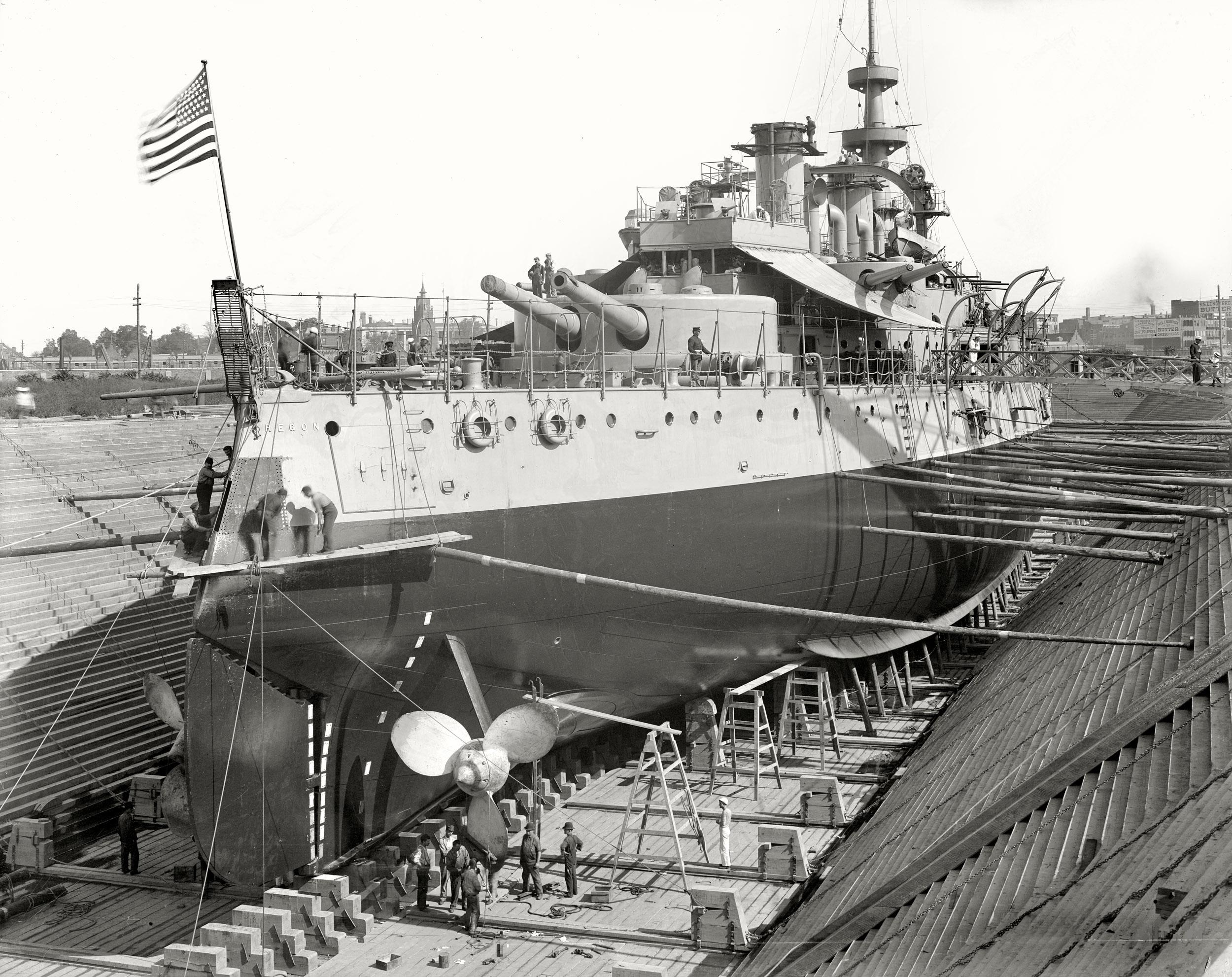
USS Oregon (BB-3) in dry dock, 1898

== See also ==
- List of dry docks
- In-water survey – Survey of the underwater parts of a ship while afloat
- Semi-submersible
- Space dock – Orbital spacecraft assembly station
- St Nazaire Raid – British amphibious attack of 28 March 1942 on a dry dock during World War II

== Sources ==
- Landels, J. G. (2000), Engineering in the Ancient World (Revised ed.), University of California Press, ISBN 0-520-22782-4
- Oleson, John Peter (1984), Greek and Roman Mechanical Water-Lifting Devices: The History of a Technology, University of Toronto Press, ISBN 90-277-1693-5
- Sarton, George (1946), "Floating Docks in the Sixteenth Century", Isis, 36 (3/4): 153–154, doi:10.1086/347934, S2CID 144849113
