= In-water survey =

Survey of the underwater parts of a ship while afloat

In-water survey (IWS) or Underwater Inspection in Lieu of Dry-docking (UWILD) is a method of surveying the underwater parts of a ship while it is still afloat instead of using a more conventional dry-dock process. Various ship classification societies use the terms IWS, UWILD, BIS (Note: Built for In-water Surveys) etc. to classify ships that this is acceptable for.

== Regulations ==
For cargo ships, two surveys are required within a period of five years. One of these can be an in-water survey, provided the ship is eligible for it.

The ship (tanker or bulk carrier) should not be more than 15 years old.
The bottom of the ship should not be painted black before carrying out the survey.
