= Hong Kong International Convention for the safe and environmentally sound recycling of ships =

Multilateral convention of the International Maritime Organization

Hong Kong Convention
Hong Kong International Convention for the safe and environmentally sound recycling of ships
- Parties Signatories that did not ratify
- Signed: 15 May 2009
- Location: Hong Kong
- Effective: 26 June 2025
- Condition: 15 ratifications, representing 40% of the world merchant shipping by gross tonnage, and on average 3% of recycling tonnage for the previous 10 years
- Signatories: 5
- Parties: 24
- Depositary: Secretary-General of IMO
- Languages: Arabic, Chinese, English, French, Russian and Spanish

The Hong Kong International Convention for the safe and environmentally sound recycling of ships, or Hong Kong Convention, is a multilateral convention adopted in 2009, which has not entered into force. The conference that created the convention was attended by 63 countries, and overseen by the International Maritime Organization (IMO).

The convention has been designed to improve the health and safety of current ship breaking practices. Ship breaking is considered to be "amongst the most dangerous of occupations, with unacceptably high levels of fatalities, injuries and work-related diseases" by the ILO as large ships are often beached and then dismantled by hand by workers with very little personal protective equipment (PPE). This is most common in Asia, with India, Bangladesh, China, and Pakistan holding the largest ship breaking yards.

The Hong Kong Convention recognised that ship recycling is the most environmentally sound way to dispose of a ship at the end of its life, as most of the ship's materials can be reused. However, it sees current methods as unacceptable. The work sees many injuries and fatalities to workers, as they lack the correct safety equipment to handle the large ship correctly as it is dismantled and most vessels contain a large amount of hazardous materials such as asbestos, PCBs, TBT, and CFCs, which can also lead to highly life-threatening diseases such as mesothelioma and lung cancer.

In advance of ratification of the Hong Kong Convention, the Industry Working Group on Ship Recycling issued Guidelines on Transitional Measures for Shipowners Selling Ships for Recycling.

== Inventory of Hazardous Materials ==
The Inventory of Hazardous Materials has been designed to try to minimise the dangers of these hazards. The Convention defines a hazard as: “any material or substance which is liable to create hazards to human health and/or the environment".

All vessels over 500 gross tons (GT) have to comply with the convention once it comes into force. Each party that does wish to comply must restrict the use of hazardous materials on all ships that fly the flag of that party.

New ships must all carry an Inventory of Hazardous Materials. The inventory will list all 'hazardous materials' on board the vessel, including their amounts and locations. Existing ships must comply no later than five years after the convention comes into force, or prior to being recycled if this occurs before the five-year period. The inventory will remain with a vessel throughout its lifespan, being updated as all new installations enter the ship, as these may potentially contain hazards. The presence of the inventory will then ensure the safety of crew members during the vessel's working life, and also the safety of workers during the recycling process.

== Signature, ratification and accession ==
The convention was open for signature between 1 September 2009 and 31 August 2010, and remained open for accession afterwards. It will enter into force two years after "15 states, representing 40% of the world merchant shipping by gross tonnage, and on average 3% of recycling tonnage for the previous 10 years, have either signed it without reservation as to ratification, acceptance or approval, or have deposited instruments of ratification, acceptance, approval or accession with the Secretary General". The convention enters into force on 26 June 2025.

Criterion	Requirement	Status
Number of Parties	15	24
Gross Tonnage of Merchant Shipping	40%	45.81%
Recycling tonnage in past 10 years	3%	3.31%(23,848,453 gross tonnage）

State	Signature	Ratification/ Accession	Entry into Force	Territorial Application
Bangladesh		26 June 2023		
Belgium		7 March 2016		
Croatia		16 February 2021		
Denmark		14 June 2017		not applicable to Greenland and Faroe Islands
Estonia		25 April 2019		
France	19 November 2009	2 July 2014		full territory
Germany		16 July 2019		
Ghana		2 August 2010		
India		28 November 2019		
Italy	2 August 2010			
Japan		27 March 2019		
Liberia		26 June 2023		
Marshall Islands		18 January 2024		
Malta		14 March 2019		
Netherlands	21 April 2010	20 February 2019		including Caribbean Netherlands
Norway		26 June 2013		
Pakistan		30 November 2023		
Panama		19 September 2016		
Portugal		28 March 2023		
Republic of the Congo		19 May 2014		
Saint Kitts and Nevis	27 August 2010			
Serbia		22 March 2019		
Spain		7 June 2021		
Turkey	26 August 2010	31 January 2019		

== Transitional Guidelines ==
In advance of ratification of the Hong Kong Convention, the Industry Working Group on Ship Recycling in 2009 issued the first edition of Guidelines on Transitional Measures for Shipowners Selling Ships for Recycling. These are supported by maritime organizations: International Chamber of Shipping (ICS), the Baltic and International Maritime Council (BIMCO), the International Association of Classification Societies (IACS), Intercargo, the International Parcel Tankers Association (IPTA), Intertanko, the Oil Companies International Marine Forum (OCIMF), and the International Transport Workers' Federation (ITF). The Transitional Measures are also supported by the national shipowners' associations of Australia, Bahamas, Belgium, Canada, Chile, Cyprus, Denmark, Faroe Islands, Finland, France, Germany, Greece, Hong Kong, India, Ireland, Italy, Japan, Korea, Kuwait, Liberia, Mexico, Netherlands, Norway, Portugal, Philippines, Russia, Singapore, Spain, Sweden, Switzerland, Turkey, United Kingdom and United States.

== Relation to EU instruments ==
The EU Ship Recycling Regulation entered into force on 30 December 2013. Although this regulation closely follows the Hong Kong convention, there are differences as the EU has stricter standards. The Regulation sets out a number of requirements for European ships, European ship owners, ship recycling facilities willing to recycle European ships, and the relevant competent authorities or administrations. The argument for developing a specified regulation for ship recycling in the European Union, was the fact that the EU noticed how many EU ships that ended up in unsustainable recycling facilities. Europeans own around 40% of the world fleet, around 15000 ships. Among these around 10000 fly an EU Member-State flag, but only 7% of the EU-flagged ships are dismantled in the EU territory, and the rest are mostly dismantled in South Asia

The SRR aims to address the environmental and health hazards associated with ship dismantling by setting high standards for EU-flagged vessels at the end of their operational lives. One of the key components developed by the EU is the European List of Approved Ship Recycling Facilities, identifying the approved ports for all EU flagged ships to be recycled. For a ship recycling yard to be included in the list, the facilities must comply with strict environmental and worker safety standards, reducing toxic waste release and promoting safe dismantling practices. Member States report to the Commission on which facilities in their territory that comply to the requirements, and thereby get included on the list. Shipyards outside the EU can also be included on the European List but must apply to the Commission with proof of the yard’s standards.

To be included on the European List, ship recycling facilities must adhere to specific requirements set by the EU and aligned with the Hong Kong Convention and other international guidelines. Facilities need authorization, robust structural and operational standards, environmental safety protocols, and measures for monitoring health and safety risks to workers and nearby populations. This includes handling hazardous materials on impermeable surfaces, training workers and provide them with protective equipment, implementing emergency plans, and recording incidents. Operators must also submit recycling plans and completion reports, ensuring full compliance and minimizing environmental and health impacts during ship recycling activities. As of November 2024, it contains 45 shipyards. Because the list works as a guarantee for a yards safety and validity, shipyards can both be removed and added to the list if they cease to comply with the regulation.

Additionally, to the list of approved facilities, the SRR also mandates each ship to hold an Inventory of Hazardous Materials (IHM), listing hazardous substances used in each ship's construction. By hazardous material’ means any material or substance which is liable to create hazards to human health and/or the environment. New installation of material such as asbestos and ozone-depleting substances are prohibited, and the occurrence of materials containing lead, mercury and radioactive substances, to name a few, are to be reported and restricted. This inventory, which must be maintained throughout the ship's life, helps guide shipyards and recyclers on safe waste management and reduces accidental environmental contamination. The ships also report on the operationally generated waste, meaning wastewater and residues generated by the normal operation of ships. By EU standards, any EU ship going for dismantling, all new European ships, and third-country ships stopping in EU ports need to have an inventory of hazardous materials on board

This list, as of 27 July 2023, contains 48 ship-recycling facilities, including 38 yards in Europe (EU, Norway and UK), 9 yards in Turkey and 1 yard in the USA. Several yards on the European List are also capable of recycling large vessels. The list excluded some of the most major ship recycling yards in India and Bangladesh, which have achieved SoCs with the HKC in various class societies. This exclusion has led to many ship owners changing the flag of their vessel before recycling or sell the ship to cash buyers, to evade the regulations. Excluded countries strive towards bringing the HKC into force as the universal regulation, arguing that it would be irrational if international shipping were regulated by multiple and competing standards.

The SRR does however come in conflict with other laws of the sea. When a ship receives a recycling certificate under the Hong Kong Convention, it may also be classified as hazardous waste under the Basel Convention. Throughout the certificate's validity, which can last up to three months, the ship's owners may face the risk of arrest in some ports for violating the Basel Convention. Through the EUs Waste Shipment Regulations they intend to implement the same rules as the Basel Convention (WSR). However, when implementing the SRR, the EU opted to unilaterally exclude EU-flagged vessels from the scope of the existing WSR. This decision effectively created an unauthorized exemption from the Basel Regime for certain types of hazardous waste, lacking sufficient justification.
