= Ship breaking =

Disposal process for scrap

External videos
- Scrapped: the deadly business of dismantling ships in Bangladesh on YouTube

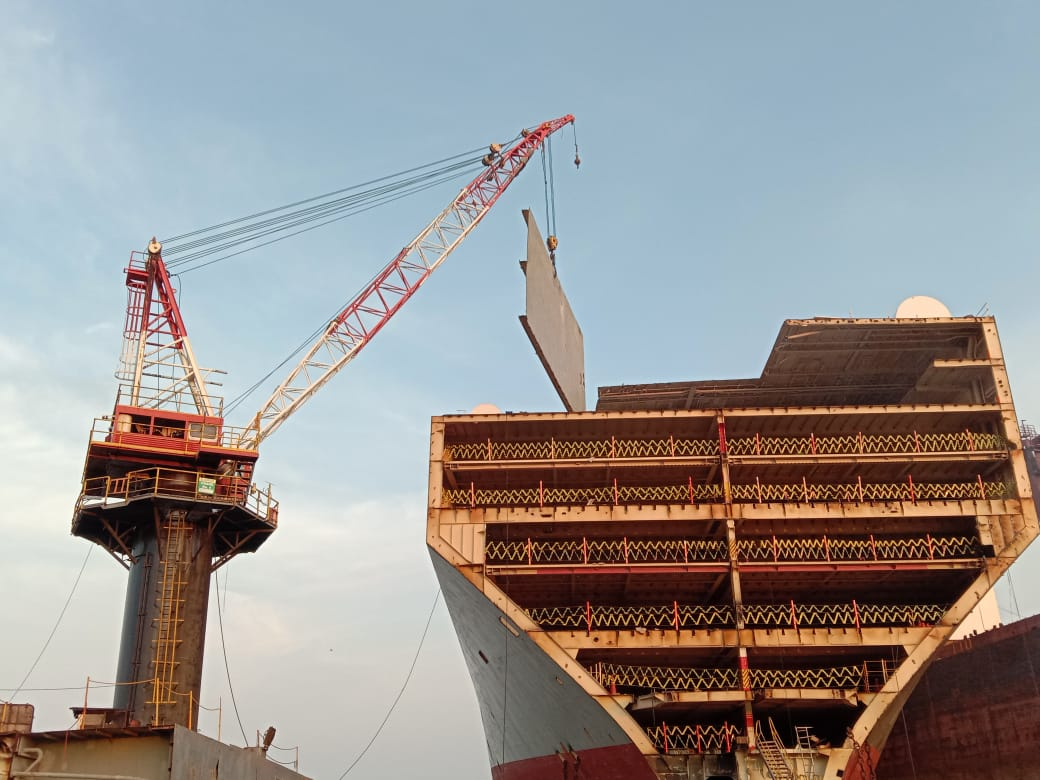
Removing steel plates from a ship using cranes at Alang Ship Breaking Yard in India

Ship breaking (also known as ship recycling, ship demolition, ship scrapping, ship dismantling, or ship cracking) is a type of ship disposal involving the breaking up of ships either as a source of parts, which can be sold for reuse, or for the extraction of raw materials, chiefly scrap. Modern ships have a lifespan of 25 to 30 years before corrosion, metal fatigue and a lack of parts render them uneconomical to operate. Ship breaking allows the materials from the ship, especially steel, to be recycled and made into new products. This lowers the demand for mined iron ore and reduces energy use in the steelmaking process. Fixtures and other equipment on board the vessels can also be reused. While ship breaking is not inherently unsustainable, there are concerns about its use by poorer countries without stringent environmental legislation. It is also labour-intensive, and considered one of the world's most dangerous industries.

In 2012, roughly 1,250 ocean ships were broken down, and their average age was 26 years. In 2013, the world total of demolished ships amounted to 29,052,000 tonnes, 92% of which were demolished in Asia. As of January 2020, Alang Ship Breaking Yard in India has the largest global share at 30%, followed by Chittagong Ship Breaking Yard in Bangladesh and Gadani Ship Breaking Yard in Pakistan.

The largest sources of ships are China, Greece, and Germany, although there is greater variation in the sources of carriers versus their disposal. The shipbreaking yards of India, Bangladesh, China and Pakistan employ 225,000 workers as well as providing many indirect jobs. In Bangladesh, the recycled steel covers 20% of the country's needs, and in India, it is almost 10%.

As an alternative to ship breaking, ships may be sunk to create artificial reefs after legally mandated removal of hazardous materials (though this does not recycle any materials), or sunk in deep ocean waters. Storage is a viable temporary option, whether on land or afloat, though most ships will eventually be scrapped; some will be sunk, or alternatively be retained and preserved as museum ships.

== History ==
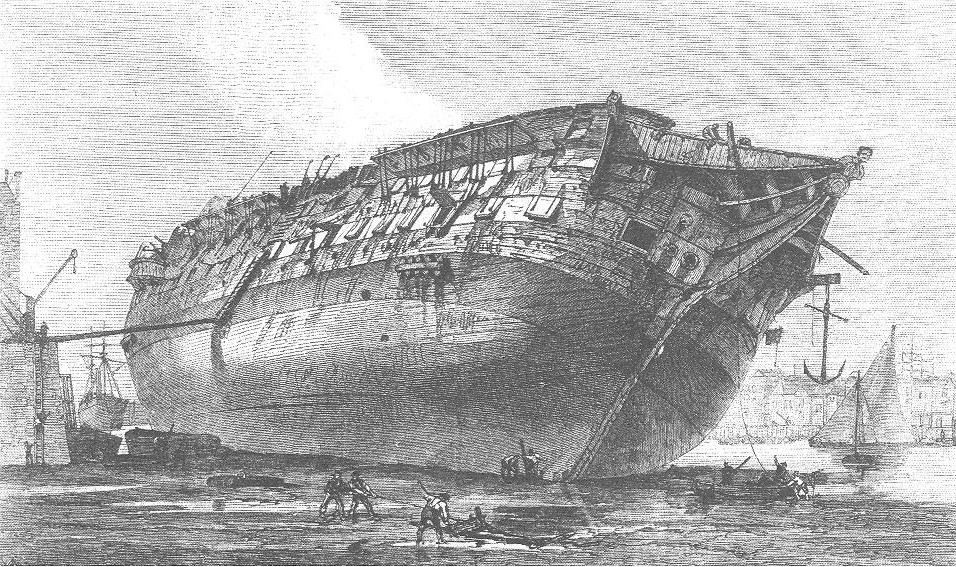
HMS Queen heeled over on the Thames foreshore off Rotherhithe, c. 1871

Wooden-hulled ships were simply set on fire or "conveniently sunk". In Tudor times (1485–1603), ships were dismantled and the timber reused. This procedure was no longer applicable with the advent of metal-hulled boats in the 19th century.

In 1880, Denny Brothers of Dumbarton used forgings made from scrap maritime steel in their shipbuilding. Many other nations began to purchase British ships for scrap by the late 19th century, including Germany, Italy, the Netherlands and Japan. The Italian industry started in 1892, and the Japanese industry after the passing of an 1896 law to subsidise native shipbuilding.

After suffering damage or disaster, liner operators did not want the name of a broken ship to tarnish the brand of their passenger services. Many Victorian ships made their final voyages with the final letter of their name chipped off.

In the 1930s, it became cheaper to "beach" a boat by running her ashore—as opposed to using a dry dock. The ship would have to weigh as little as possible and would run ashore at full speed. Dismantling operations required a 10-foot (3 m) rise of tide and close proximity to a steelworks. Electric shears, a wrecking ball and oxyacetylene torches were used. The technique of the time closely resembles that used in developing countries as of 2020. Thos. W. Ward Ltd., one of the largest breakers in the United Kingdom in the 1930s, would recondition and sell all furniture and machinery. Many historical artifacts were sold at public auctions: the Cunarder RMS Mauretania, sold as scrap for £78,000, received high bids for her fittings worldwide. However, any weapons and military information, even if obsolete, were carefully removed by Navy personnel before turning over the ship for scrapping.

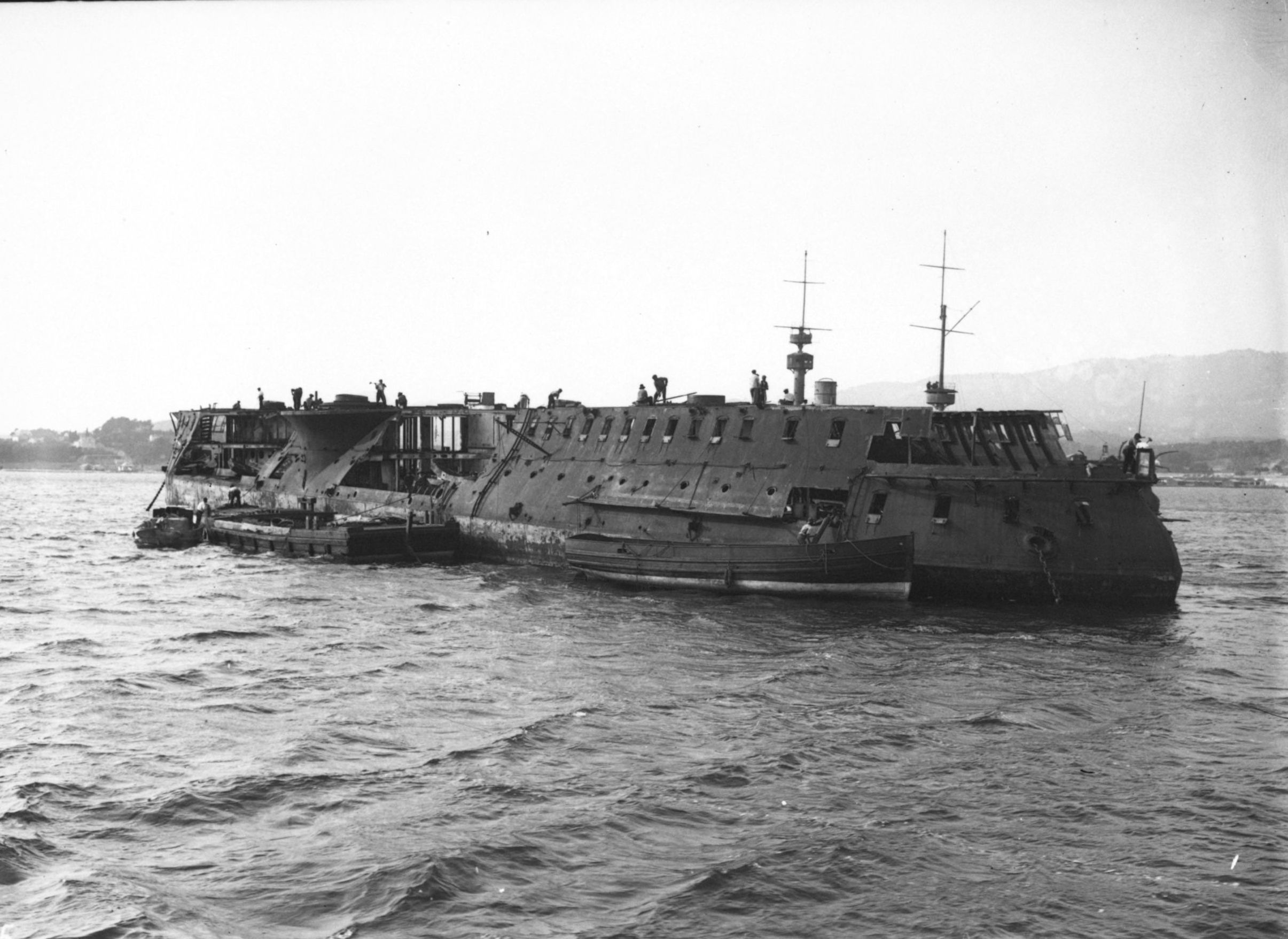
Dismantling of Redoutable in Toulon, 1912

In 2020, as the COVID-19 pandemic crippled the cruise ship trade, cruise vessels began to appear more frequently in shipbreaking facilities.

=== Location trends ===
Until the late 20th century, the majority of ship breaking activity took place in the port cities of industrialized countries such as the United Kingdom and the United States. As of 2020, those dismantlers that still remain in the United States work primarily on government-surplus vessels.

Starting in the mid-20th century, East Asian countries with lower labour costs began to dominate ship breaking. As labour costs rose, centres of the shipbreaking industry moved—initially from countries such as Japan and Hong Kong, to Korea and Taiwan and then to China. For example, the southern port city of Kaohsiung in Taiwan operated as the world's leading dismantling site in the late 1960s and 1970s, breaking up 220 ships, totalling 1.6 million tons in 1972 alone; in 1977, Taiwan continued to dominate the industry with more than half the market share, followed by Spain and Pakistan. At the time, Bangladesh had no capacity at all. However, the sector is volatile and fluctuates wildly, and Taiwan processed just two ships 13 years later as wages across East Asia rose. For comparison, depending on their profession, ship-breakers in Kaohsiung earned from NT$40 (day labourer) to NT$180 (torch operator) per day in 1973.

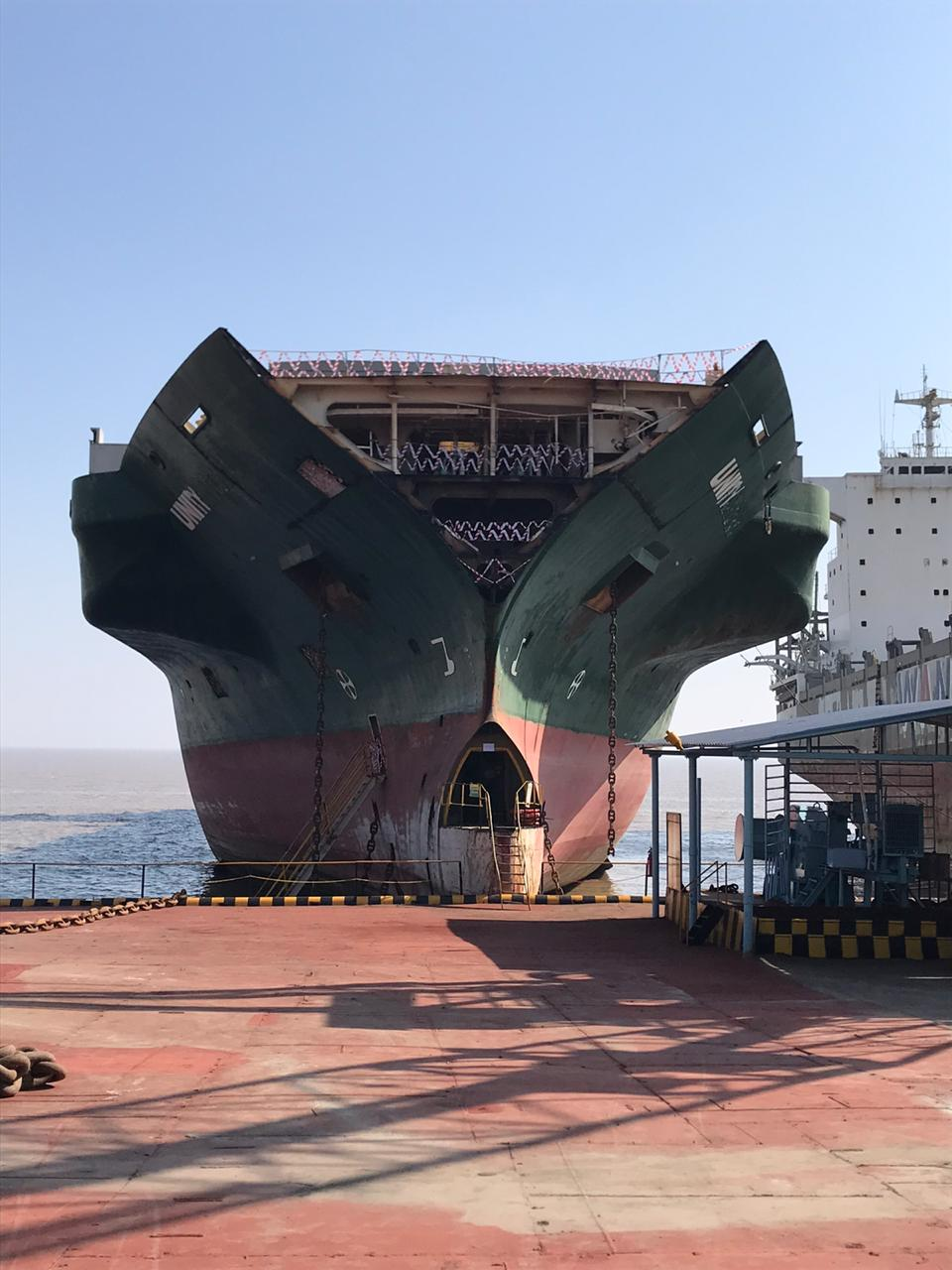
Ship recycled in beaching method

In 1960, after a severe cyclone, the Greek ship M D Alpine was stranded on the shores of Sitakunda, Chittagong (then part of East Pakistan). It could not be refloated and so remained there for several years. In 1965, the Chittagong Steel House bought the ship and had it scrapped. It took years to scrap the vessel, but the work gave birth to the industry in Bangladesh. Until 1980, the Gadani Ship Breaking Yard of Pakistan was the largest shipbreaking yard in the world.

Tightening environmental regulations resulted in increased hazardous waste disposal costs in industrialised countries in the 1980s, causing the export of retired ships to lower-income areas, chiefly in South Asia. This, in turn, created a far worse environmental problem, subsequently leading to the Basel Convention of 1989. In 2004, a Basel Convention decision officially classified old ships as "toxic waste", preventing them from leaving a country without the permission of the importing state. This has led to a resurgence of recycling in environmentally compliant locations in developed countries, especially in former shipbuilding yards.

On 31 December 2005, the French Navy's Clemenceau left Toulon to be dismantled at the Alang Ship Breaking Yard, India—despite protests over improper disposal capabilities and facilities for the toxic wastes. On 6 January 2006, the Supreme Court of India temporarily denied access to Alang, and the French Conseil d'État ordered Clemenceau to return to French waters. Able UK in Hartlepool received a new disassembly contract to use accepted practices in scrapping the ship. The dismantling started on 18 November 2009 and the breakup was completed by the end of 2010; the event was considered a turning point in the treatment of redundant vessels. Europe and the United States have had a resurgence in ship scrapping since the 1990s.

In 2009, the Bangladesh Environmental Lawyers Association won a legal case prohibiting all substandard ship breaking. For 14 months, the industry could not import ships and thousands of jobs were lost before the ban was annulled. That same year, the global recession and lower demand for goods led to an increase in the supply of ships for decommissioning. The rate of scrapping is inversely correlated to the freight price, which collapsed in 2009.

== Technique ==
The decommissioning process is entirely different in developed countries than it is in developing countries. In both cases, ship-breakers bid for the ship, and the highest bidder wins the contract. The ship-breaker then acquires the vessel from the international broker who deals in outdated ships. The price paid is approximately $400 per tonne; regions with more lax environmental legislation typically can offer higher prices. For the industry in Bangladesh, 69% of revenue is spent on purchasing vessels; only 2% is labour costs. The ship is taken to the decommissioning location either under its own power or with the use of tugs.

=== Developing countries ===
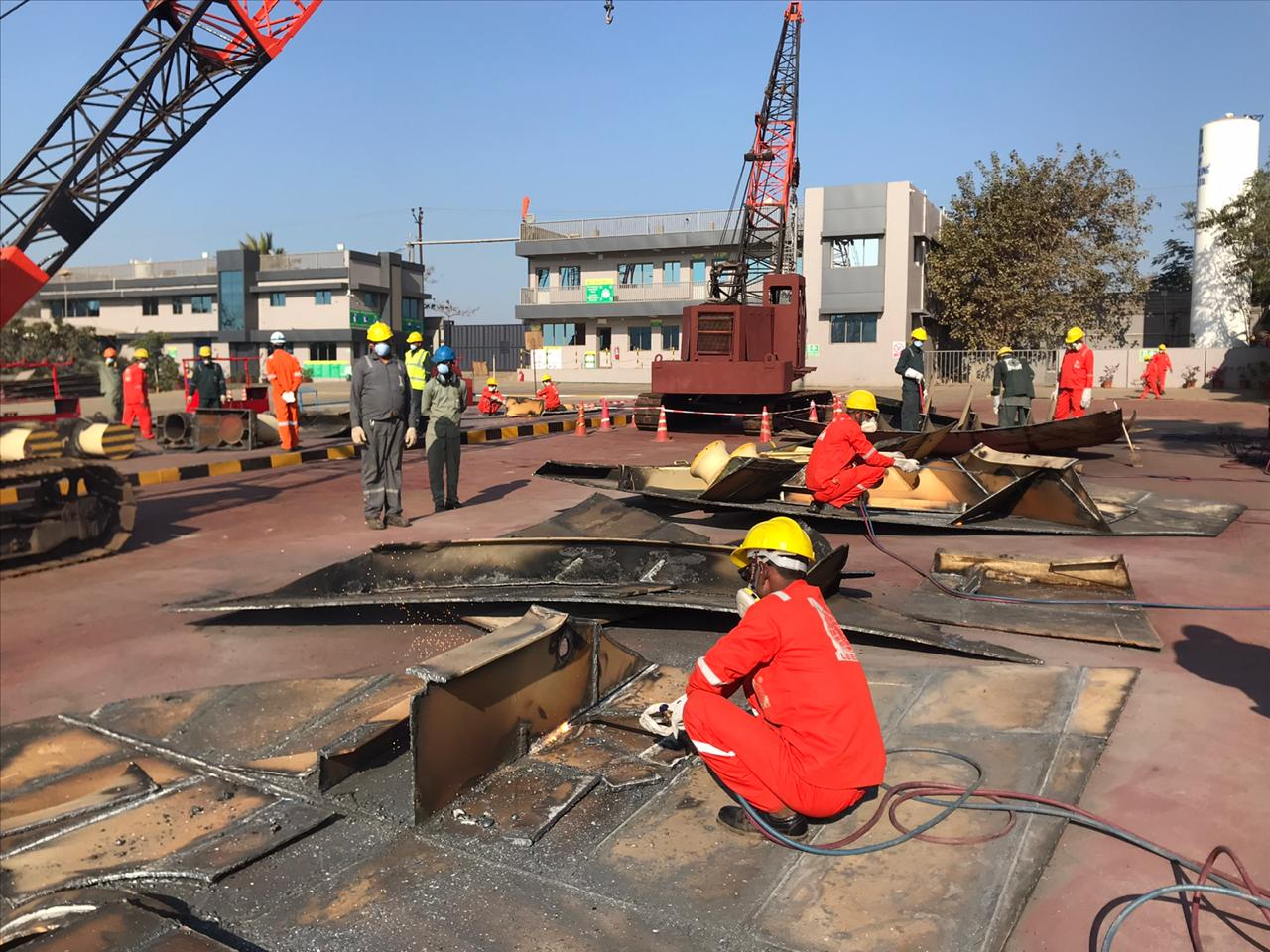
Steel plate cutting using gas cutter at Alang Ship Breaking Yard (India)

In developing countries, chiefly the Indian subcontinent, ships are run ashore on gently sloping sand tidal beaches at high tide so that they can be accessed for disassembly. In the beaching method, no external source of energy is used to pull the ship, as opposed to the dry dock method of ship recycling where a ship is floated into the dry dock using a substantial amount of energy. However, maneuvering a large ship onto a beach at high speed takes skill and daring even for a specialist captain, and is not always successful. Next, the anchor is dropped to steady the ship and the engine is shut down. It takes 50 labourers about three months to break down a normal-sized cargo vessel of about 40,000 tonnes.

Before the decommissioning begins, various clearances and permissions are obtained from regulatory, pollution and customs authorities after a thorough inspection is conducted by them. The ship recycling process then begins with the draining of fuel, hydraulic fluid, coolant, lubricating oils and firefighting liquid, which may be disposed of or sold to the trade. Any reusable fixtures are sold to the trade. Any kind of waste such as plastic, garbage, or oily sand is sent to waste treatment facilities, like the Common Hazardous Waste Treatment Storage Disposal Facility (CHW-TSDF) set up by the Gujarat Maritime Board in Alang. Any usable oil is sent to government-authorized refineries where used oil is chemically treated. The next steps entail recovering unused and partially spent materials, disposal of bilge water, recovering and obtaining reusable materials, and safe disposal of biohazardous materials like asbestos and glass wool. Each of these materials are inspected and sent to regulated waste treatment facilities or to buyers for further use and processing.

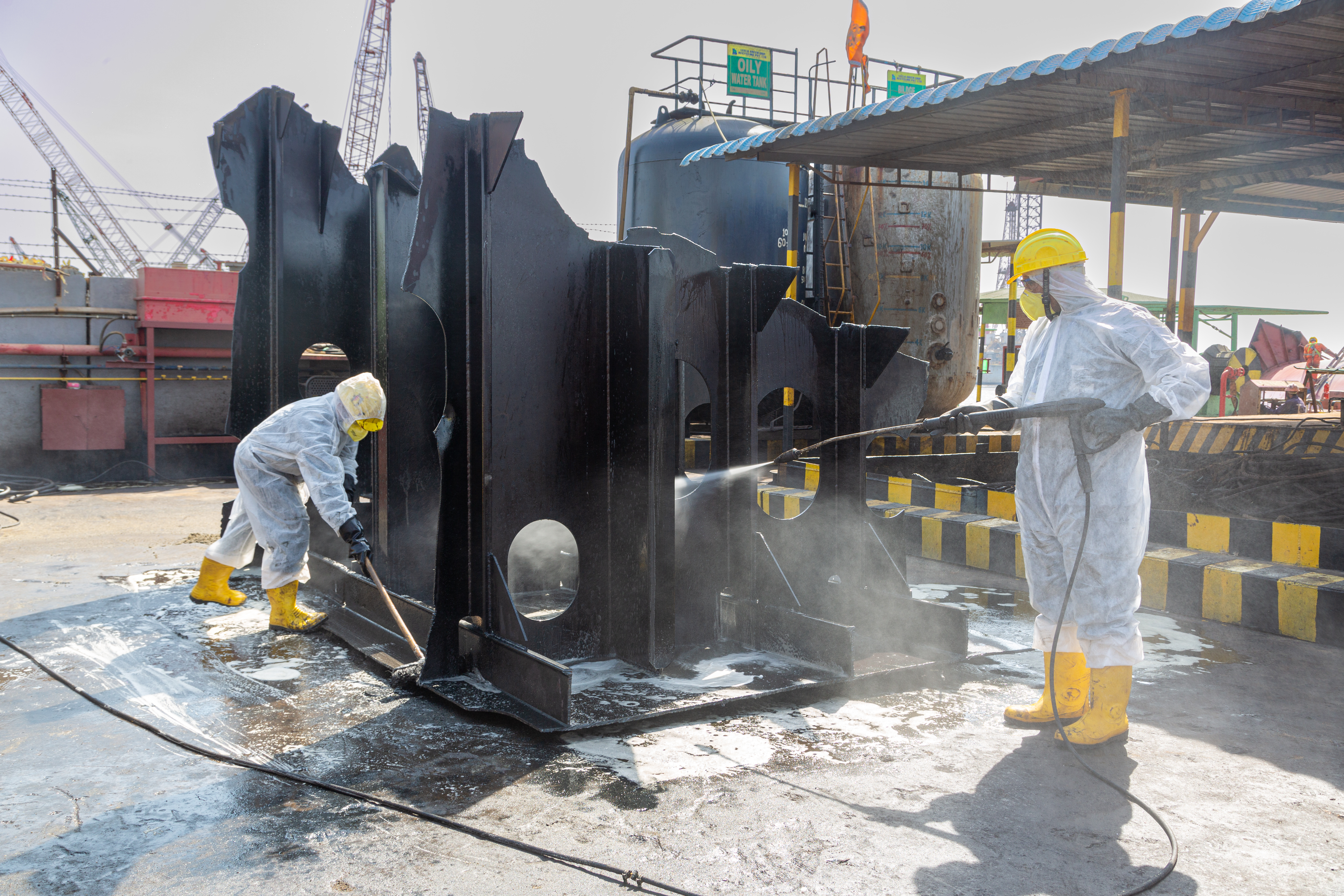
Cleaning of oil-stained sections of recycled ship on an impervious floor in Alang, India

In recycling yards in the Indian subcontinent, specifically in Alang, upgraded facilities such as 100% impervious floors with drainage systems, heavy-lift cranes, yard and vessel-specific training for workers, and the development and implementation of Ship Recycling Facility Plans and Ship Recycling Plans (as per IMO's guidelines in Resolutions MEPC.210(63) and MEPC.196(62)) have been implemented.

=== Developed countries ===
In developed countries, the dismantling process mirrors the technical guidelines for the environmentally sound management of the full and partial dismantling of ships, published by the Basel Convention in 2003. Recycling rates of 98% can be achieved in these facilities.

Prior to dismantling, an inventory of dangerous substances is compiled. All hazardous materials and liquids, such as bilge water, are removed before disassembly. Holes are bored for ventilation and all flammable vapours are extracted.

Vessels are initially taken to a dry dock or a pier, although a dry dock is considered more environmentally friendly because all spillage is contained and can easily be cleaned up. Floating is, however, cheaper than a dry dock. Stormwater discharge facilities will stop an overflow of toxic liquid into the waterways. The carrier is then secured to ensure its stability. Often, the propeller is removed beforehand to allow the watercraft to be moved into shallower water.

Anything of value, such as spare parts and electronic equipment, is sold for reuse, although labour costs mean that low-value items are not economical to sell. The Basel Convention demands that all yards separate hazardous and non-hazardous waste and have appropriate storage units, and this must be done before the hull is cut up. Asbestos, found in the engine room, is isolated and stored in custom-made plastic wrapping prior to being placed in secure steel containers, which are then landfilled.

Many hazardous wastes can be recycled into new products. Examples include lead–acid batteries or electronic circuit boards. Another commonly used treatment is cement-based solidification and stabilization. Cement kilns are used because they can treat a range of hazardous wastes by improving physical characteristics and decreasing the toxicity and transmission of contaminants. Hazardous waste may also be "destroyed" by incinerating it at a high temperature; flammable wastes can sometimes be burned as energy sources. Some hazardous waste types may be eliminated using pyrolysis in a high-temperature electrical arc, in inert conditions to avoid combustion. This treatment method may be preferable to high-temperature incineration in some circumstances such as in the destruction of concentrated organic waste types, including PCBs, pesticides, and other persistent organic pollutants. Dangerous chemicals can also be permanently stored in landfills as long as leaching is prevented.

Valuable metals, such as copper or aluminum in electric cable, that are mixed with other materials may be recovered by the use of shredders and separators in the same fashion as e-waste recycling. The shredders cut the electronics into metallic and non-metallic pieces. Metals are extracted using magnetic separators, air flotation separator columns, shaker tables, or eddy currents. Plastic almost always contains regulated hazardous waste (e.g., asbestos, PCBs, hydrocarbons) and cannot be melted down.

Large objects, such as engine parts, are extracted and sold as they become accessible. The hull is cut into 300-tonne sections, starting with the upper deck and working slowly downwards. While oxyacetylene gas torches are most commonly used, detonation charges can quickly remove large sections of the hull. These sections are transported to an electric arc furnace to be melted down into new ferrous products, though toxic paint must be stripped prior to heating.

=== Historical techniques ===
At Kaohsiung in the late 1960s and '70s, ships to be scrapped were tied up at berths in Dah Jen and Dah Lin Pu, at the southern end of Kaohsiung Harbor. There were a total of 24 breaking berths at Kaohsiung; each berth was rented by the scrapper from the Port Authority at a nominal rate of NT$7 per square foot per month, and up to 18,000 square feet (1,700 m^{2}) could be rented surrounding a 300-foot-long (91 m) berth at a time. A typical 5,000-ton ship could be broken up in 25 to 30 days.

The process began with "cleaning", a process in which subcontractors would come on board the ship to strip it of loose and flammable items, which were often resold in second-hand shops. After that, the cutting crews would start to dismantle the hull, stern first; large sections were cut off the ship and moved via cranes and rigging taken from previously scrapped ships. Because the scrapping at Kaohsiung was done at the docks, scrap metal was placed on trucks waiting to transport it to Kaohsiung's mills.

== Conventions and regulations ==
=== The Basel Convention ===
The Basel Convention on the Control of Trans-boundary Movements of Hazardous Wastes and Their Disposal of 1989 was the first convention to environmentally govern the shipbreaking industry. It has been ratified by 187 countries, including India and Bangladesh. It controls the international movement of hazardous wastes and for their environmentally sound management mainly through consent for the shipment between the authorities of the country exporting the hazardous wastes with the authorities of the importing country.

Though the Basel Convention has notably reduced illegal exports of hazardous wastes to countries that are unable to process and dispose of them in an environmentally sound manner, it has failed to define the minimum standards of recycling soundly. It also completely ignores important aspects such as workers' safety and falls short in overcoming bureaucratic barriers when it comes to communication between exporting and importing countries. Furthermore, the decision to scrap a ship is often made in international waters, where the convention has no jurisdiction.

The "Ban Amendment" to the Basel Convention was adopted in March 1994, prohibiting the export of hazardous wastes from OECD countries to non-OECD countries. The Amendment would enter into force 90 days after it has been ratified by at least three-quarters of the 87 countries that were Parties to the Convention at the time it was adopted. Croatia deposited the 66th ratification in September 2019, and the Ban Amendment entered into force 25 years after adoption on December 5, 2019. However, the European Union had already enacted the Ban Amendment unilaterally through the European Waste Shipment Regulation, which incorporated the Basel Convention and the Ban Amendment into European Union law in February 1993. The European Union replaced its previous regulation with the Waste Shipment Regulation (EC) No 1013/2006 (the WSR), which also unilaterally implemented the Ban Amendment, prohibiting the export of hazardous wastes from European Union member states to any developing countries (i.e. non-OECD) and regulating their export to OECD countries through the Basel Convention's prior informed consent mechanism.

When the European Commission attempted to apply the WSR to end-of-life ships, it encountered numerous obstacles and evasion. This is because, in enforcing the Ban Amendment, the European Waste WSR considers it illegal to recycle any ship that has started its last voyage from a European Union port in Bangladesh, China, India, or Pakistan, regardless of the flag the ship flies. These four non-OECD countries have consistently recycled around 95% of the world's tonnage. In fact, according to a study conducted by the European Commission in 2011, at least 91% of ships covered by the WSR disobeyed or circumvented its requirements. The European Commission admitted publicly that enforcing its own Waste Shipment Regulation to recycle ships had not been successful. The commission, unable to wait for the Hong Kong Convention (HKC) to take effect, began developing new legislation to regulate the recycling of European-flagged ships. This led the European Commission in 2012 to propose the development of a new European Regulation on Ship Recycling.

=== The Hong Kong Convention ===
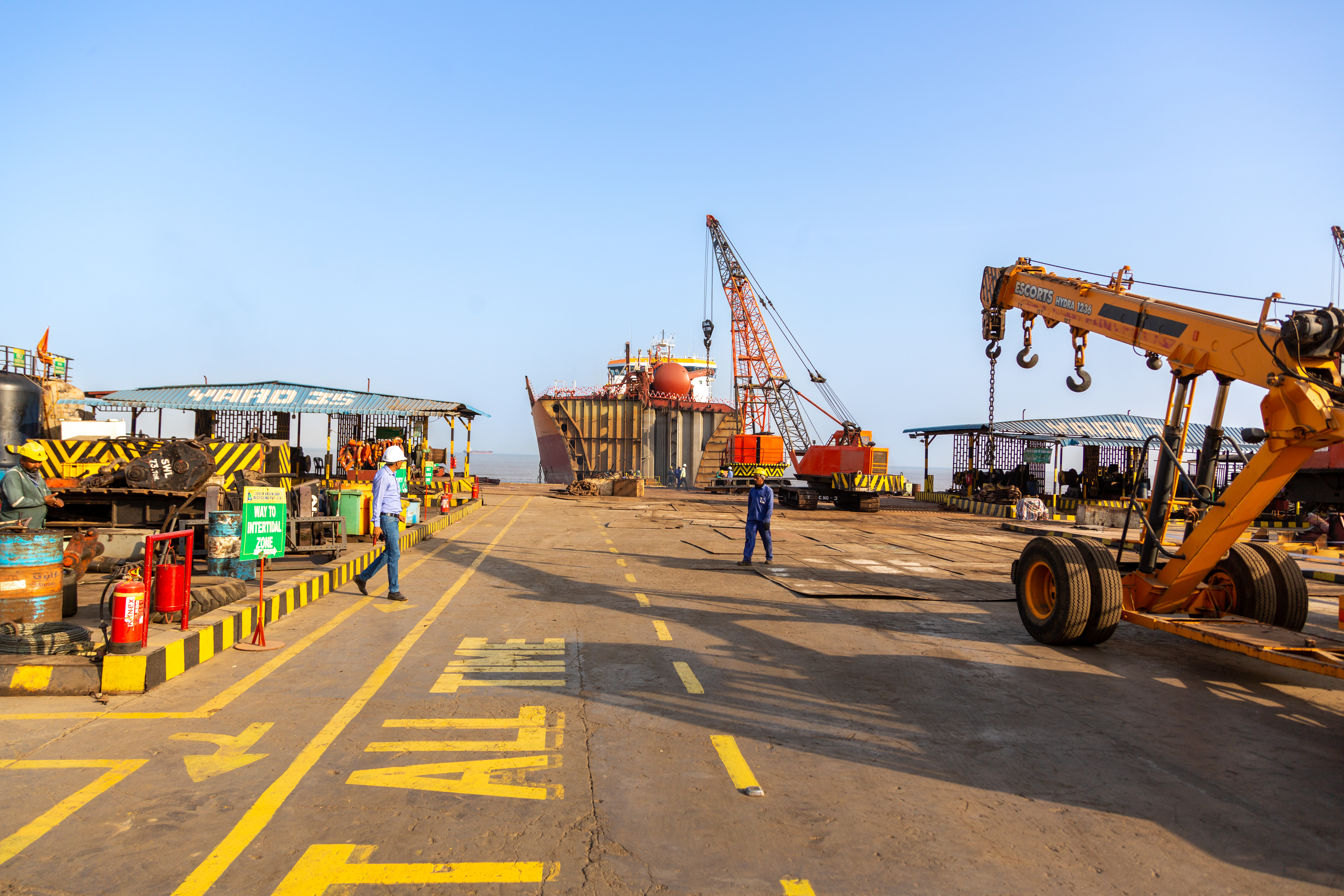
Hong Kong Convention–compliant yard in Alang, India

To overcome the difficulties of the Basel Convention in terms of the inordinate time and effort required in gaining the consent of all countries involved in its due time, and to highlight regulations that this convention left out, its governing body requested the International Maritime Organisation for a newer convention in 2004. Thus, the Hong Kong Convention came into existence. In essence, the Convention aims to ensure that ships, when being recycled after reaching the end of their operational lives, do not pose any unnecessary risks to human health, safety and the environment. The convention covers regulations including:

1. the design, construction, operation and preparation of ships to facilitate safe and environmentally sound recycling, without compromising the safety and operational efficiency of ships;
2. the operation of ship recycling facilities in a safe and environmentally sound manner; and
3. the establishment of an appropriate enforcement mechanism for ship recycling (certification/reporting requirements).

With much more sound standards of ship recycling, easier implementation and better supervision, the Hong Kong Convention was finally adopted in 2009. The conditions for its entry into force were fulfilled in 2023, and the Convention entered into force on 25 June 2025. These conditions required:

1. ratification or accession by 15 States,
2. the fleet of the States that have ratified or acceded to represent at least 40 percent of world merchant shipping by gross tonnage, and
3. the combined maximum annual ship recycling volume of the States during the preceding 10 years to constitute not less than 3 percent of the gross tonnage of the combined merchant shipping of the same States.

As of 2 April 2023, 20 countries have acceded to the HKC, making up 30.16% of the world's merchant shipping by gross tonnage, with a combined maximum annual ship recycling volume of the States at 2.6 % of the gross tonnage of the combined merchant shipping of the same States. Subsequent accessions increased both figures beyond the required thresholds, enabling the Convention to enter into force on 25 June 2025.

Nearly 110 of India's 120 operational ship recycling yards have achieved Statements of Compliance (SoC) with the Hong Kong Convention by various IACS class societies—including ClassNK, IRClass, Lloyd's Register and RINA. In Bangladesh, 17 ship recycling yards have now achieved Statements of Compliance with the Hong Kong Convention. Furthermore, to encourage the growth of India's vital ship recycling sector, in November 2019, the Government of India acceded to the Hong Kong Convention for Safe and Environmentally Sound Recycling of Ships, becoming the first South Asian country and a major ship recycling destination to take that step prior to the Convention’s entry into force on 25 June 2025.

=== The EU Ship Recycling Regulation (EUSRR) ===
The work on the EU's Ship Recycling Regulation (SRR) was started in 2013, after the adoption of the requirements from the Hong Kong International Convention for the safe and environmentally sound recycling of ships (HKC). However, it differs from the HKC in the way yards are authorised and in its list of inventories of hazardous materials, or IHM The argument for developing a specified regulation for ship recycling in the European Union was that the EU noticed how many EU ships ended up in unsustainable recycling facilities. Europeans own around 40% of the world fleet, around 15,000 ships. Among these, around 10,000 fly an EU Member State flag, but only 7% of the EU-flagged ships are dismantled in the EU territory, and the rest are mostly dismantled in South Asia.

After the financial crisis in the early 2010s, many shipowners ended up with an unexpected overcapacity of ships, and were selling off their vessels. The phasing out of single-hull oil tankers also provided a rush to change out one's fleet. The EU's new FuelEU maritime initiative is also incentivising decarbonization of the maritime sector, which requires ships to sail on new renewables or less polluting fuels. This implies that the EU fleet already has and will undergo major changes and renewals in the coming years, thus leading to many ships being outdated or phased out, many being concerned for the end-of-life handling of these older ships.

The SRR aims to address the environmental and health hazards associated with ship dismantling by setting high standards for EU-flagged vessels at the end of their operational lives. One of the key components developed by the EU is the European List of Approved Ship Recycling Facilities, identifying the approved ports for all EU-flagged ships to be recycled. For a ship recycling yard to be included in the list, the facilities must comply with strict environmental and worker safety standards, reducing toxic waste release and promoting safe dismantling practices. Member States report to the Commission on which facilities in their territory that comply to the requirements, and thereby are included on the list. Shipyards outside the EU can also be included on the European List but must apply to the Commission with proof of the yard's standards.

To be included on the European List, ship recycling facilities must adhere to specific requirements set by the EU and aligned with the Hong Kong Convention and other international guidelines. Facilities need authorization, robust structural and operational standards, environmental safety protocols, and measures for monitoring health and safety risks to workers and nearby populations. This includes handling hazardous materials on impermeable surfaces, training workers and provide them with protective equipment, implementing emergency plans, and recording incidents. Operators must also submit recycling plans and completion reports, ensuring full compliance and minimizing environmental and health impacts during ship recycling activities. As of November 2024, it contains 45 shipyards. Because the list works as a guarantee for a yard's safety and validity, shipyards can both be removed and added to the list if they cease to comply with the regulation.

Additionally, to the list of approved facilities, the SRR also mandates each ship to hold an Inventory of Hazardous Materials (IHM), listing hazardous substances used in each ship's construction. "Hazardous material" refers to any material or substance which is liable to create hazards to human health and/or the environment. New installation of material such as asbestos and ozone-depleting substances are prohibited, and the occurrence of materials containing lead, mercury and radioactive substances, to name a few, are to be reported and restricted. This inventory, which must be maintained throughout the ship's life, helps guide shipyards and recyclers on safe waste management and reduces accidental environmental contamination. The ships also report on the operationally generated waste, meaning wastewater and residues generated by the normal operation of ships. By EU standards, any EU ship going for dismantling, all new European ships, and third-country ships stopping in EU ports need to have an inventory of hazardous materials on board.

This list, as of 27 July 2023, contains 48 ship recycling facilities, including 38 yards in Europe (EU, Norway and UK), nine yards in Turkey and one yard in the USA. Several yards on the European List are also capable of recycling large vessels. The list excluded some of the most major ship recycling yards in India and Bangladesh, which have achieved SoCs with the HKC in various class societies. This exclusion has led to many shipowners changing the flag of their vessel before recycling or sell the ship to cash buyers, to evade the regulations. Excluded countries strive towards bringing the HKC into force as the universal regulation, arguing that it would be irrational if international shipping were regulated by multiple and competing standards.

==== Criticism and practical challenges of EUSRR ====
The EU Ship Recycling Regulation (EUSRR) faces practical issues that limit its global impact. Industry groups, including the European Community Shipowners' Associations (ECSA), have pointed out that several Indian ship recycling yards meet or exceed international standards but remain excluded from the European List. The European Union has audited some of these yards yet withheld approval for reasons outside the control of the yard operators. Examples include the absence of a trauma centre and downstream waste management facilities of EU standard within immediate proximity.The Gujarat Maritime Board has already allocated funding to build a trauma centre in Alang, but these investments have not changed the approval outcome.

The method of beaching ships is another area of concern. While the EUSRR does not explicitly prohibit beaching, the lack of approvals for yards using this method suggests an indirect disqualification. Technical assessments show that when managed with strict environmental and safety controls, beaching can achieve safe and environmentally sound recycling comparable to alternative methods.

Economic data further illustrates the challenge. Unskilled labour wages in South Asia range from 4 to 6 US dollars per day. In Turkey, wages are about 16 to 17 US dollars per day. For a 10,000 light displacement tonnage (LDT) vessel requiring four months of recycling and about 100 workers, the wage difference adds about 144,000 US dollars or roughly 15 US dollars per LDT. Hazardous waste disposal is also less costly in India. Disposal of asbestos costs about 300 US dollars per ton in India compared to 800 US dollars per ton in Turkey. Paint chip disposal costs about 200 US dollars per ton in India compared to 500 US dollars per ton in Turkey. A typical recycling project can save about 150,000 US dollars in environmental and waste management costs when performed in India instead of Turkey.

The market value of recycled steel compounds the disparity. Turkey and other EU-approved yards send most recovered ferrous material for melting, which generates lower domestic value compared to the direct reuse of steel plates common in South Asia. This reduces the price per LDT that EU-approved yards can offer. Turkey often pays 90 to 160 US dollars less per LDT than South Asian yards, and some EU-listed yards pay 200 to 300 US dollars less.

Evidence also shows that higher costs do not always equate to better environmental results. A 2012 study reported heavy metal contamination at levels above prescribed limits in the Aliağa ship recycling zone in Turkey. This raises questions about whether EUSRR requirements guarantee superior environmental outcomes.

Experts recommend that the EU consider a bilateral agreement with India to address these issues and to reflect actual safety and environmental performance in its yard approvals. Such an approach could strengthen global compliance and create a more balanced economic framework for ship recycling.

== Dangers ==
=== Health risks ===
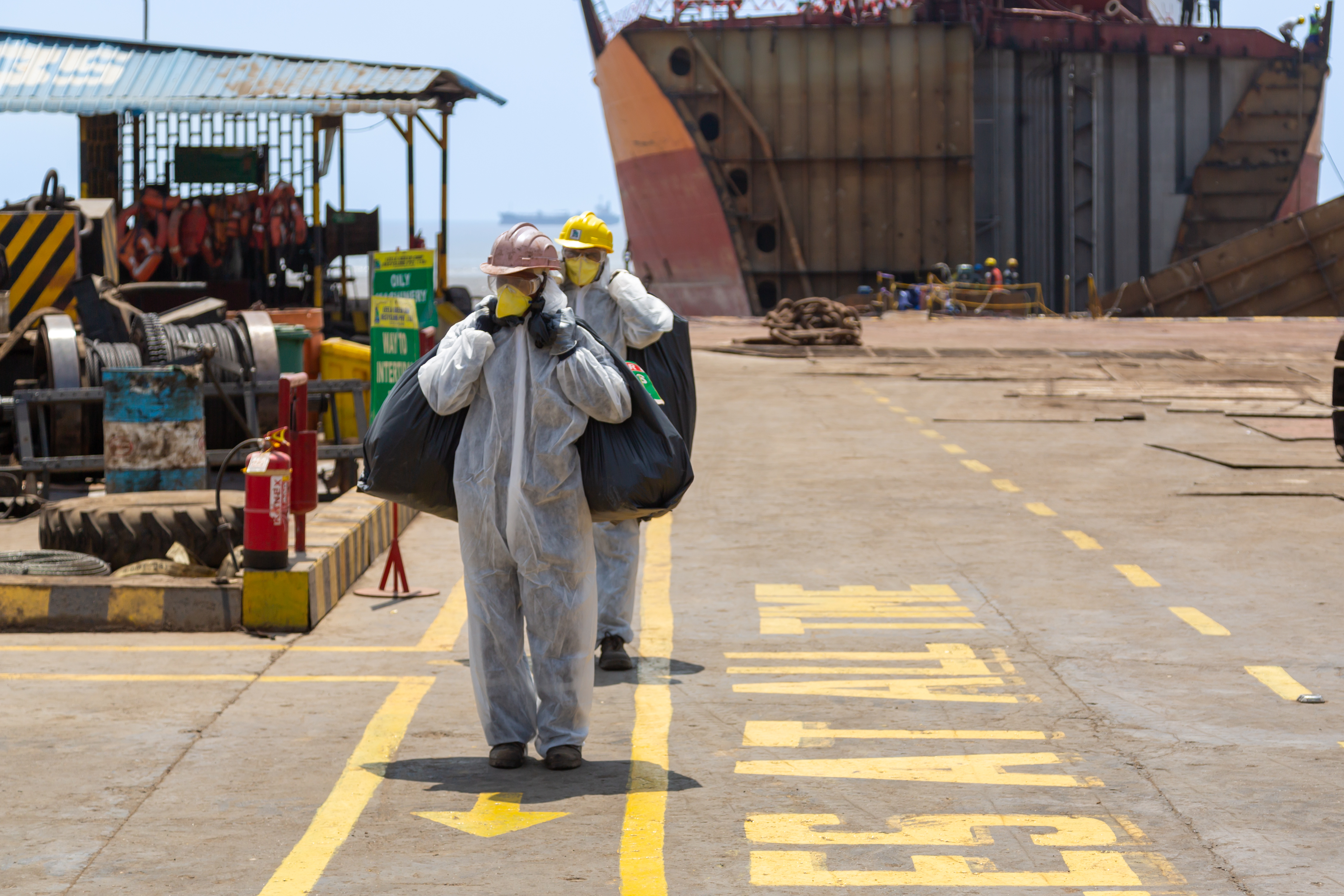
Safe removal of hazardous materials from recycled ships in Alang, India

Seventy percent of ships are simply run ashore in developing countries for disassembly, where (particularly in older vessels) potentially toxic materials such as asbestos, lead, polychlorinated biphenyls and heavy metals along with lax industrial safety standards pose a danger for the workers. Burns from explosions and fire, suffocation, mutilation from falling metal, cancer and disease from toxins are regular occurrences in the industry. Asbestos was used heavily in ship construction until it was finally banned in most of the developed world in the mid-1980s. Currently, the costs associated with removing asbestos, along with the potentially expensive insurance and health risks, have meant that shipbreaking in most developed countries is no longer economically viable. Dangerous vapours and fumes from burning materials can be inhaled, and dusty asbestos-laden areas are commonplace.

Removing the metal for scrap can potentially cost more than the value of the scrap metal itself. In the developing world, however, shipyards can operate without the risk of personal injury lawsuits or workers' health claims, meaning many of these shipyards may operate with high health risks. Protective equipment is sometimes absent or inadequate. The sandy beaches cannot sufficiently support the heavy equipment, which is thus prone to collapse. Many are injured from explosions when flammable gas is not removed from fuel tanks. In Bangladesh, a local watchdog group claims that, on average, one worker dies per week and one is injured per day.

The problem is caused by negligence from national governments, shipyard operators and former ship owners disregarding the Basel Convention. According to the Institute for Global Labour and Human Rights, workers who attempt to unionize are fired and then blacklisted. The employees have no formal contract or any rights, and sleep in overcrowded hostels. The authorities produce no comprehensive injury statistics, so the problem is underestimated. Child labour is also widespread: 20% of Bangladesh's ship breaking workforce are below 15 years of age, mainly involved in cutting with gas torches.

There is, however, an active ship-breaker's union in Mumbai, India (Mumbai Port Trust Dock and General Employees' Union) since 2003 with 15,000 members, which strikes to ensure fatality compensation. It has set up a sister branch in Alang, gaining paid holidays and safety equipment for workers since 2005. They hope to expand all along the South Asian coastline.

Even poor occupational safety record at Alang, the world's largest ship recycling destination, underlines the risks of the shipbreaking industry. Poor worker safety has led to a number of accidents and dozens of workers' deaths at the Alang yards over the years. According the IndustriALL Global Union affiliate, Alang Sosiya Ship Recycling and General Workers' Association (ASSRGWA), between January 2009 and October 2012, at least 54 workers had died in work-related accidents at the Alang shipbreaking yards. Besides worker unions, such frequent accidents due to poor safety standards at Alang have also attracted EU scrutiny.

In Alang, safety awareness drives with hoardings, posters, films as well as training programmes for different categories of workers under the Safety Training and Labour Welfare Institute, safety evaluation by external teams, personal protective equipment (PPEs) including gloves, gumboot, goggles and masks are provided to workers to mitigate the hazards of their work. In addition to this, GMB has also included regular medical examinations of workers exposed to biohazardous materials, provision of medical facilities at the Red Cross Hospital in Alang, mobile medical vans and health awareness programmes.

Several United Nations committees are increasing their coverage of ship-breakers' human rights. In 2006, the International Maritime Organisation developed legally binding global legislation which concerns vessel design, vessel recycling and the enforcement of regulation thereof and a 'Green Passport' scheme. Watercraft must have an inventory of hazardous material before they are scrapped, and the facilities must meet health and safety requirements. The International Labour Organization created a voluntary set of guidelines for occupational safety in 2003. Nevertheless, Greenpeace found that even pre-existing mandatory regulation has had little noticeable effect for labourers, due to government corruption, yard owner secrecy and a lack of interest from countries who prioritise economic growth. There are also guards who look out for any reporters. To safeguard worker health, the report recommends that developed countries create a fund to support their families, certify carriers as 'gas-free' (i.e. safe for cutting) and to remove toxic materials in appropriate facilities before export. To supplement the international treaties, organisations such as the NGO Shipbreaking Platform, the Institute for Global Labour and Human Rights and ToxicsWatch Alliance are lobbying for improvements in the industry.

=== Environmental risks ===
Ship recycling was once a major environmental and occupational health concern. Many yards lacked strict controls and allowed hazardous materials to contaminate air, soil and water, creating risks for workers and local communities. Since then, large recycling nations have upgraded their facilities to comply with the Hong Kong International Convention for the Safe and Environmentally Sound Recycling of Ships (HKC), which entered into force on 25 June 2025, bringing mandatory global standards for hazardous materials management, worker safety and environmental protection. Environmental and worker safety groups such as Greenpeace and International Labour Organization (ILO) continue to monitor compliance. Earlier assessments highlighted risks to mangroves, biodiversity and coastal stability. Recent studies and international oversight indicate that certified yards in Bangladesh and India now operate under improved waste management and coastal protection measures in line with HKC requirements.

The Hong Kong International Convention for the Safe and Environmentally Sound Recycling of Ships, adopted in 2009 and entered into force on 25 June 2025, was designed to address these concerns on a global scale. The Convention sets legally binding requirements for the design, construction, operation and preparation of ships so they can be recycled without endangering human health or the environment. It also requires ship recycling facilities to meet strict standards for hazardous waste handling, worker safety and environmental protection, and to obtain certification and provide detailed reporting.

The Basel Convention on the Control of Transboundary Movements of Hazardous Wastes and Their Disposal of 1989 has been ratified by 166 countries, including India and Bangladesh, and in 2004, end-of-life ships were subjected to its regulations. It aims to stop the transportation of dangerous substances to less-developed countries and mandate the use of regulated facilities. The decision to scrap a ship is often made in international waters, beyond the Basel Convention's scope.

The European Union Ship Recycling Regulation, fully applicable since 2018 and under regular review, requires EU-flagged vessels to be dismantled in facilities listed on the European List of approved yards. Under these rules, if a vessel has a European flag, it must be disposed of in a shipyard on an EU "green list". The facilities would have to show that they are compliant, and it would be regulated internationally in order to bypass corrupt local authorities. However, there is evidence of shipowners changing their vessel's flag to evade the regulations. China's scrap industry has vehemently protested against the proposed European regulations. Although Chinese recycling businesses are less damaging than their South Asian counterparts, European and American ship-breakers comply with far more stringent legislation.

That being said, ship recycling yard owners have made investments into upgrading their recycling facilities and safety infrastructure in the recent past, including 100% impervious floors with drainage systems, setting up of hazardous waste processing facilities like the Common Hazardous Wastes Treatment, Storage and Disposal Facility (CHW-TSDF) in Alang, and adherence to various internationally recognised conventions. The ship recycling industry also produces about 4.5 million tons of re-rollable steel per year. That comes up to nearly 2% of total steel produced in India, coming from a process that does not exploit natural resources and thereby saves nonrenewable natural resources and energy. Recycling of one ton of scrap saves 1.1 tons of iron ore, 0.6–0.7 tons of coking coal and around 0.2–0.3 tons of fluxes. Specific energy consumption for production of steel through BF-BOF (primary) and EAF& IF (secondary routes) is 14 MJ/kg and 11.7 MJ/kg, respectively. Thus, it leads to savings in energy by 16–17%. It also reduces the water consumption and GHG emission by 40% and 58%, respectively.

== List of ship-breaking yards ==
The following are some of the world's largest ship breaking yards:

=== Bangladesh ===
- Chittagong Ship Breaking Yard at Chittagong

=== Belgium ===
- Galloo, Ghent, formerly Van Heyghen Recycling

=== China ===
- Changjiang Ship Breaking Yard, located in Jiangyin, China

=== India ===
As of 2025, India remains one of the world's largest ship recycling centres, handling about 30 percent of global ship breaking by volume. India ratified the Hong Kong International Convention for the Safe and Environmentally Sound Recycling of Ships in 2019 through its Recycling of Ships Act, 2019, and the Convention entered into force on 25 June 2025.

Nearly all active yards in Alang and other centres now operate with Statements of Compliance issued by internationally recognised classification societies, meeting Hong Kong Convention standards for worker safety, hazardous-waste management and environmental protection.

These measures have positioned India to receive a growing share of end-of-life vessels from Europe, Japan, and other Hong Kong Convention Parties, supporting continued expansion of the country’s recycling revenue and capacity.

- Alang Ship Breaking Yard
- Steel Industrials Kerala Limited

=== Pakistan ===
- Gadani Ship Breaking Yard

=== Turkey ===
- Aliağa Ship Breaking Yard, at Aliağa

=== United Kingdom ===
- Able UK, Graythorpe Dock, Teesside

=== United States ===
- SA Recycling, Brownsville, Texas
- International Shipbreaking, Brownsville, Texas
- Mare Island Dry Docks, Vallejo, California

== Gallery ==
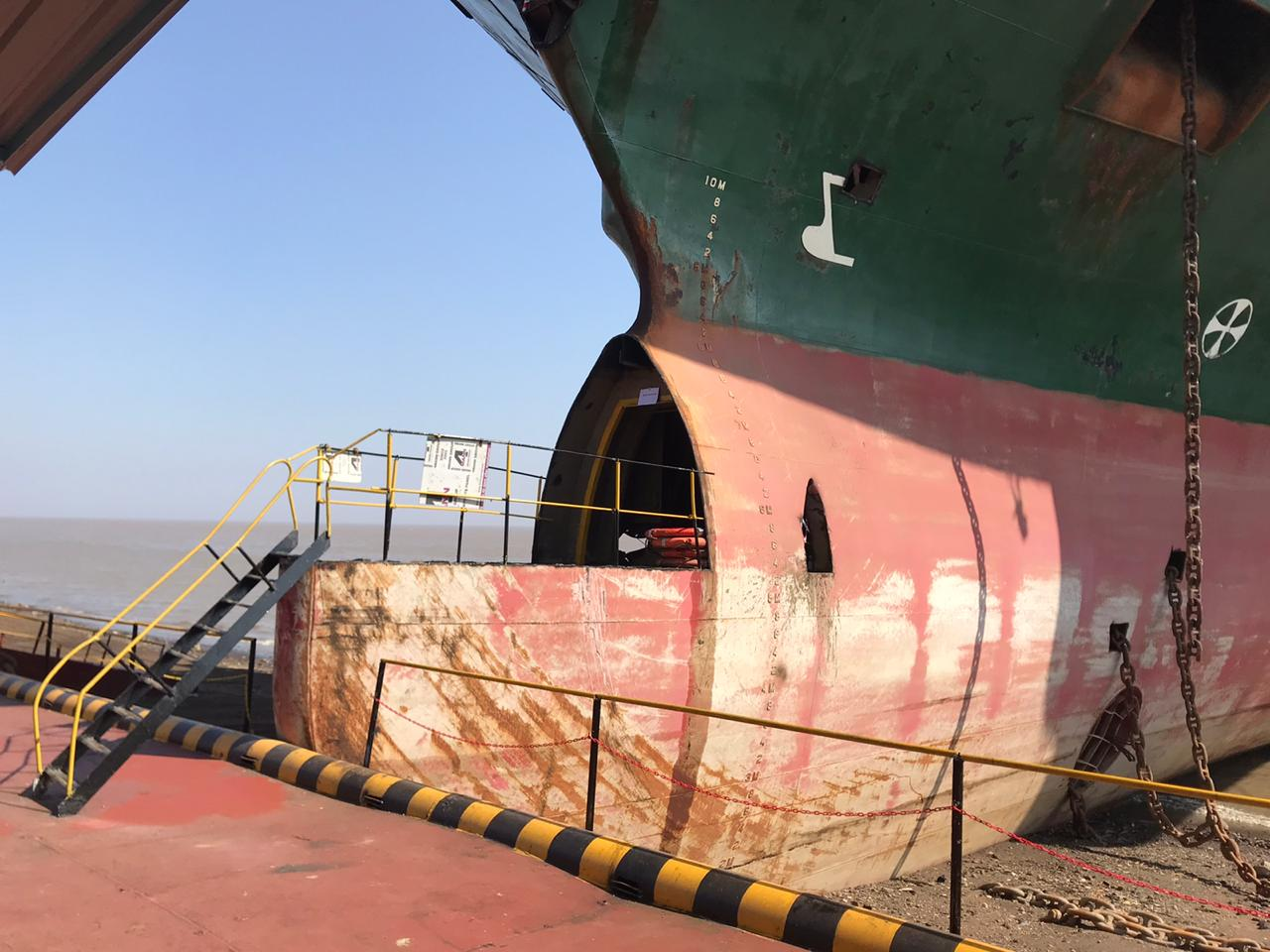
Safe accesses to the ships during recycling

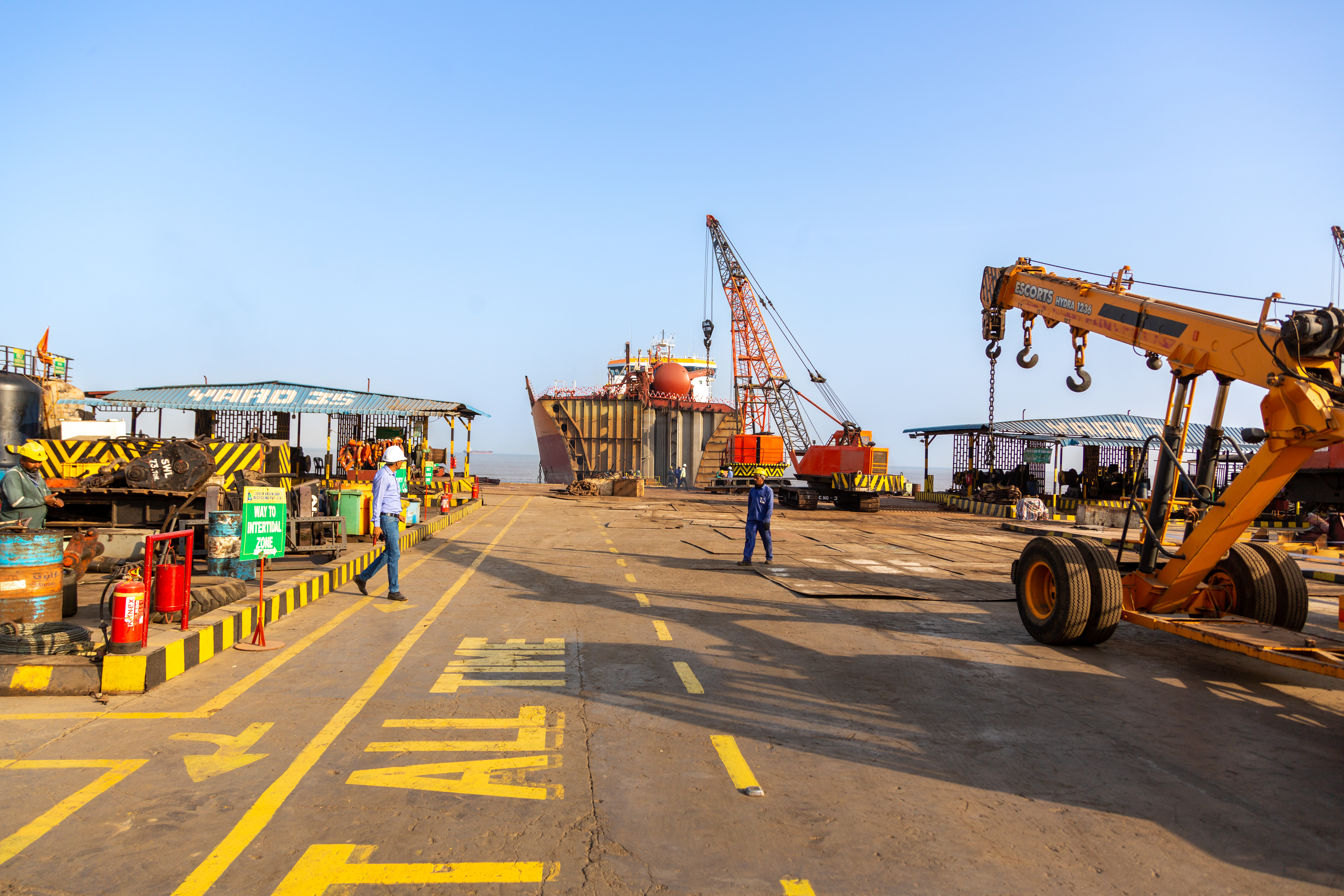
Ground view of Hong Kong Convention–compliant ship recycling yard in Alang, india

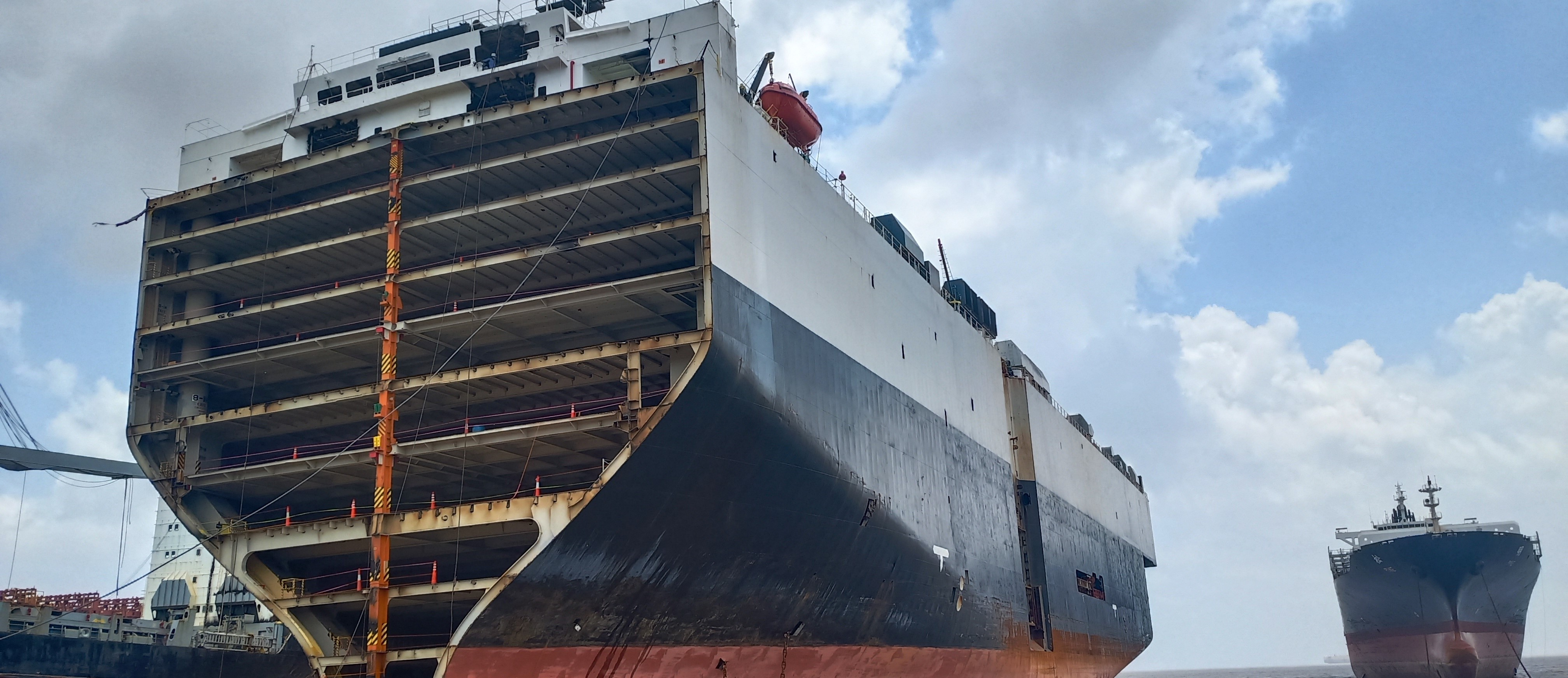
Ship recycling in Alang

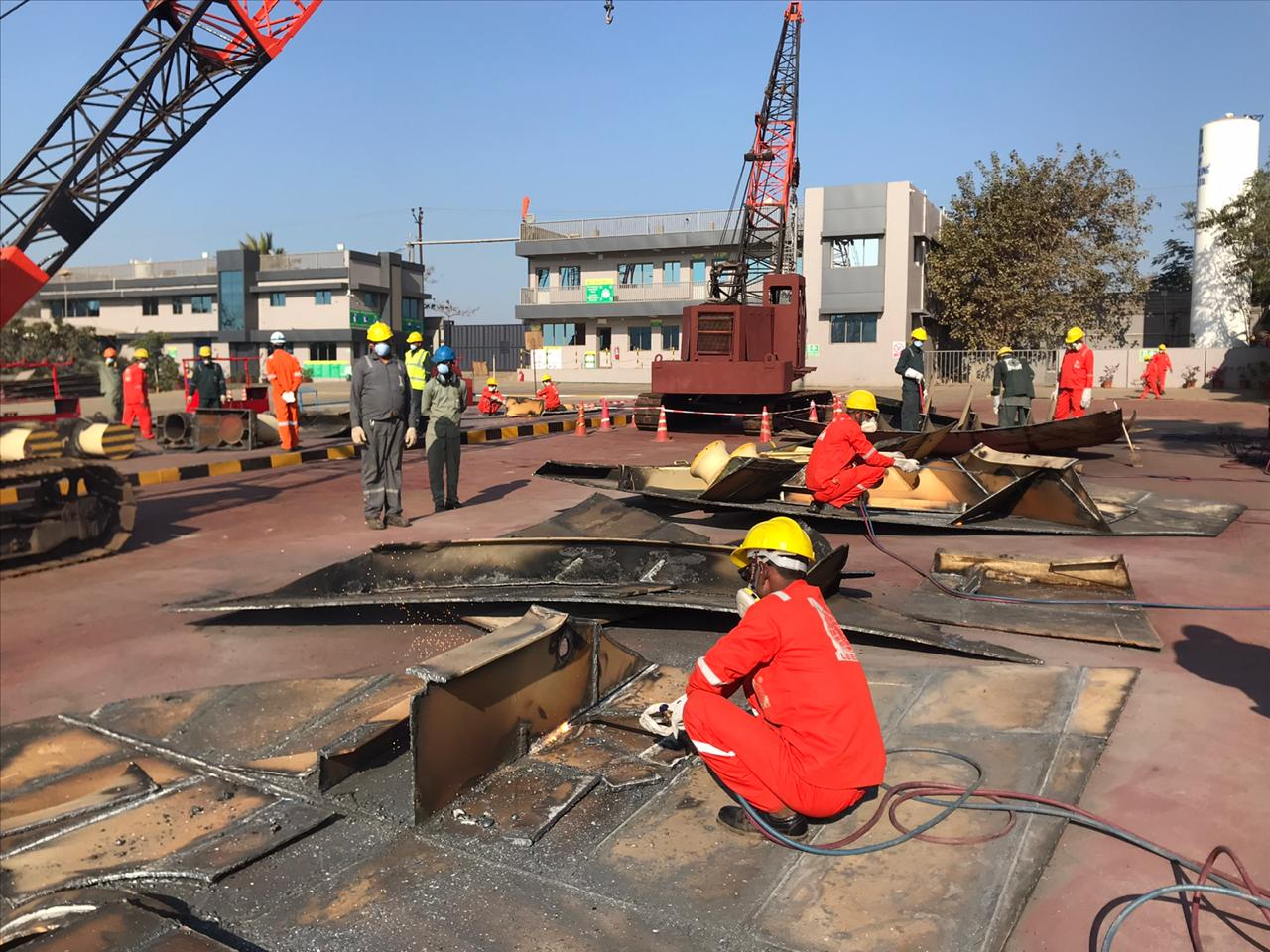
Cutterman in ship recycling yard

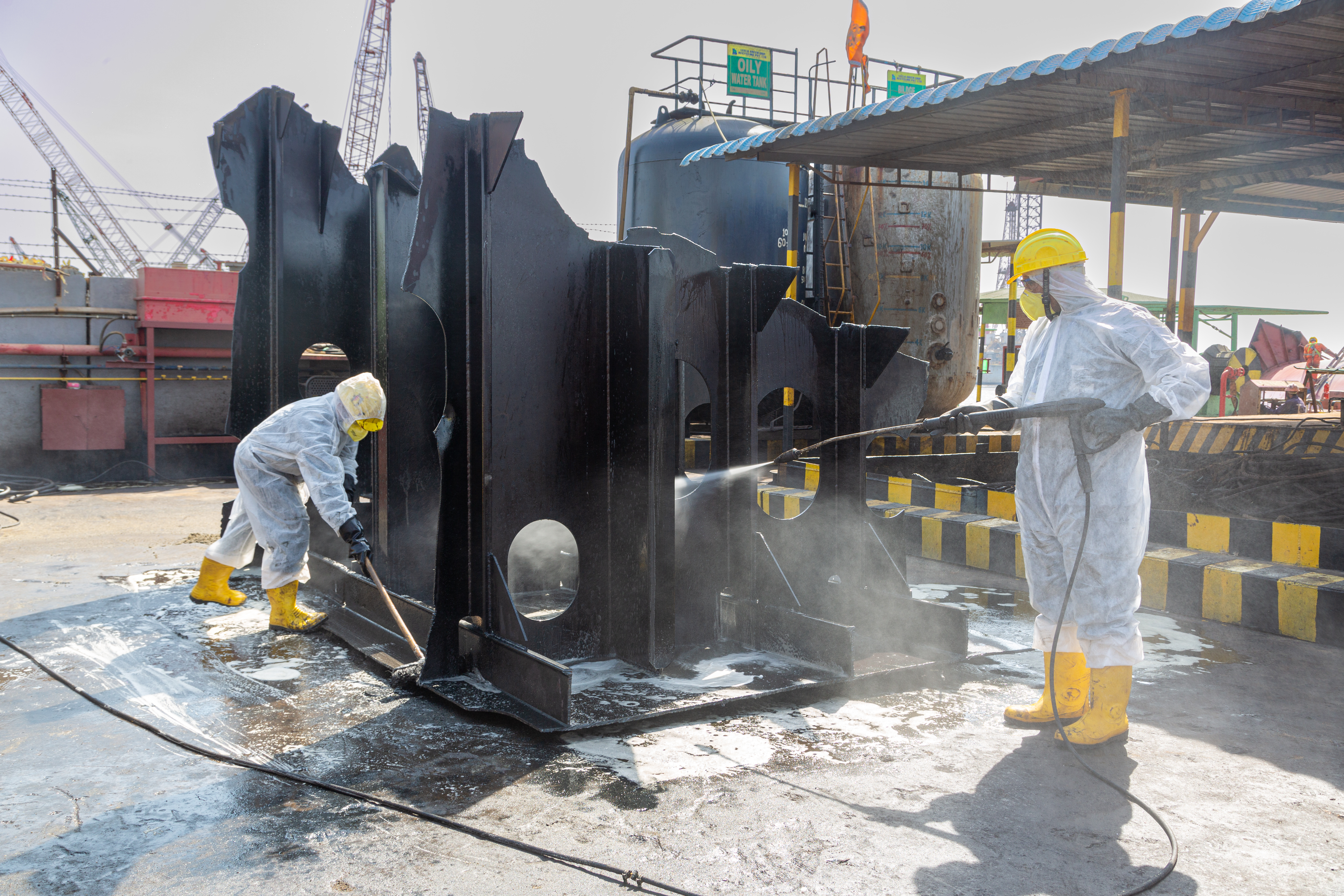
Cleaning of oil-stained sections at Hong Kong Convention–compliant ship recycling yard in Alang, India

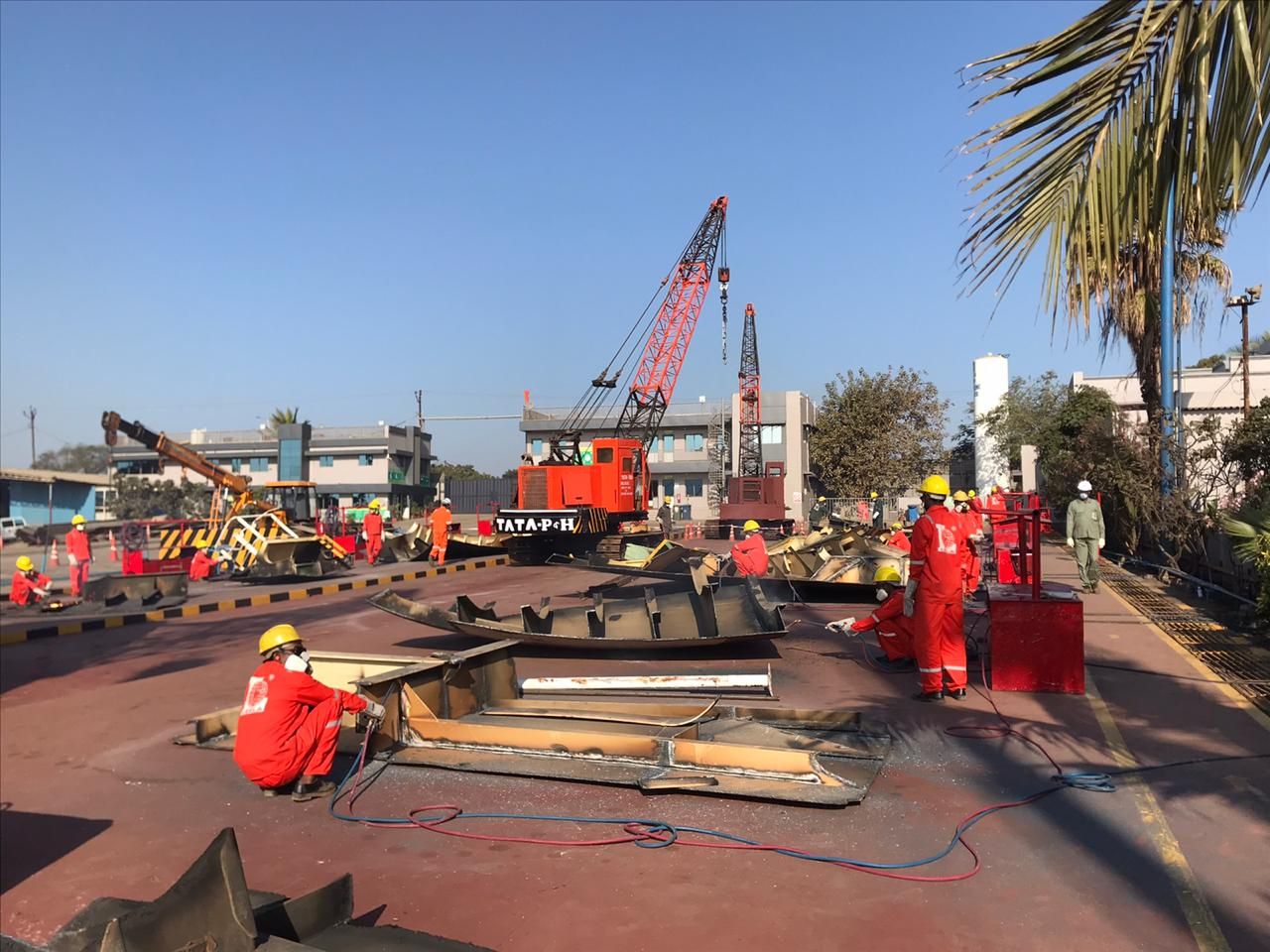
Impermeable floor in ship recycling yard

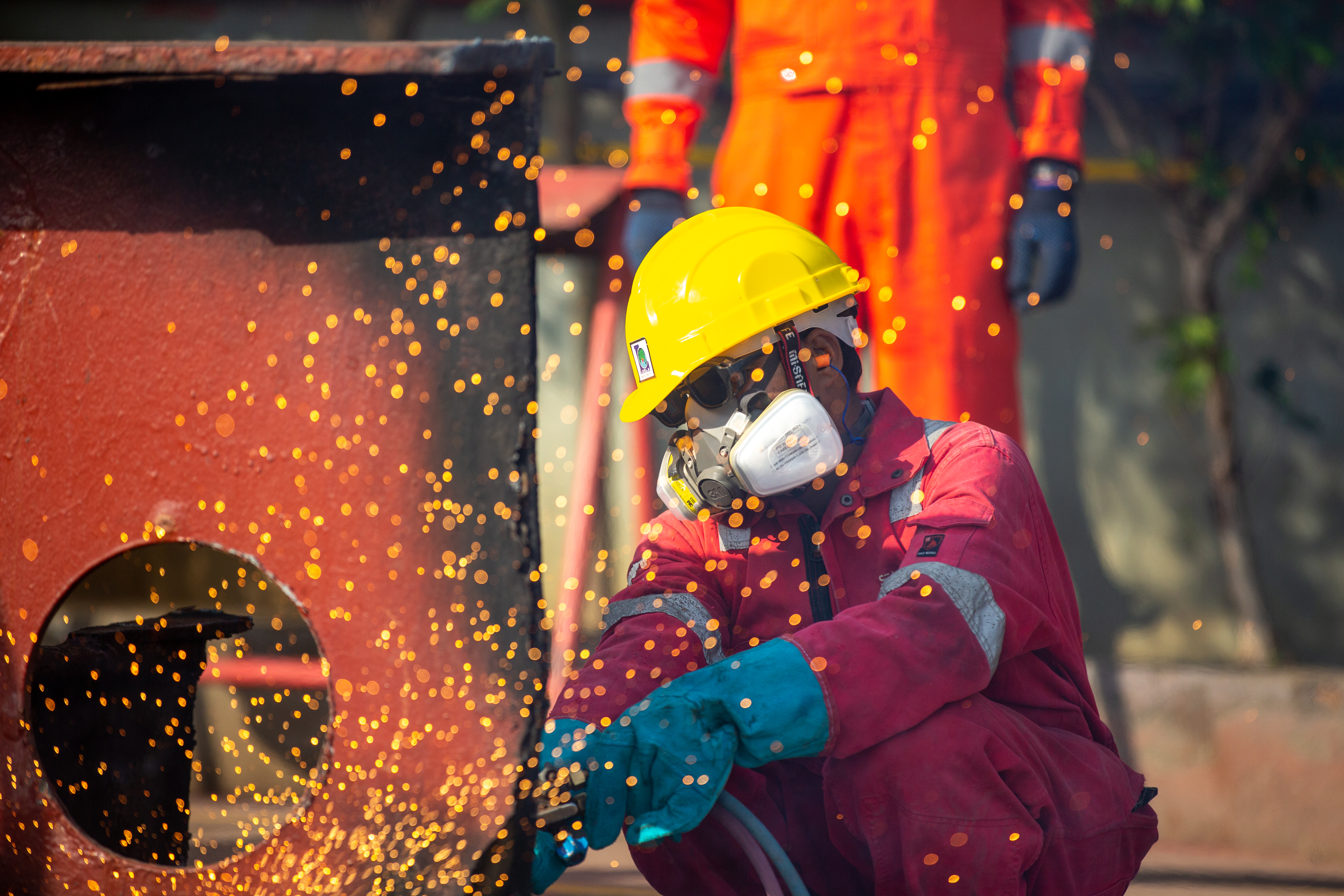
Slicing of recycled vessel's hull using gas cutter in Hong Kong Convention–compliant yard in India

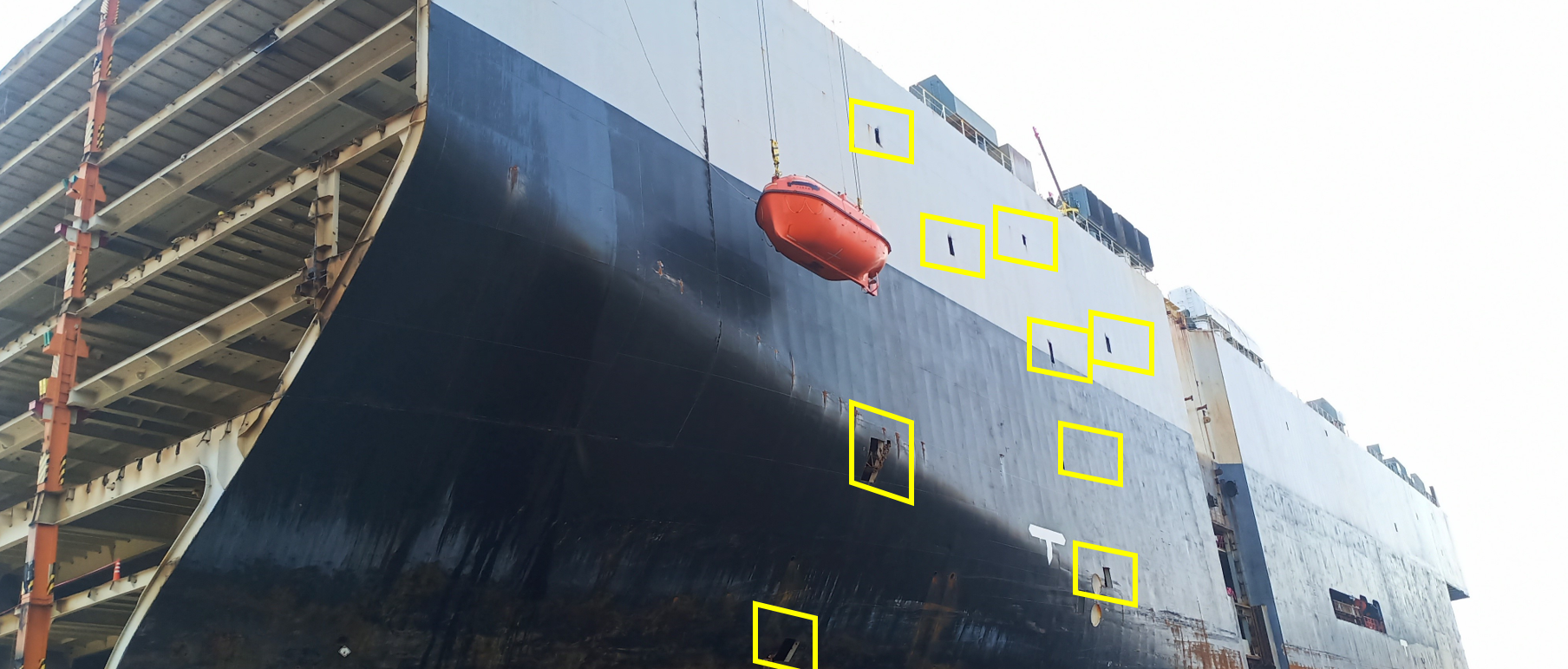
Window cut for ventilation and illumination during ship recycling

Aerial view of a ship recycling yard in Chattogram (Chittagong), Bangladesh, showing an end-of-life vessel positioned alongside the recycling facility and associated yard infrastructure.

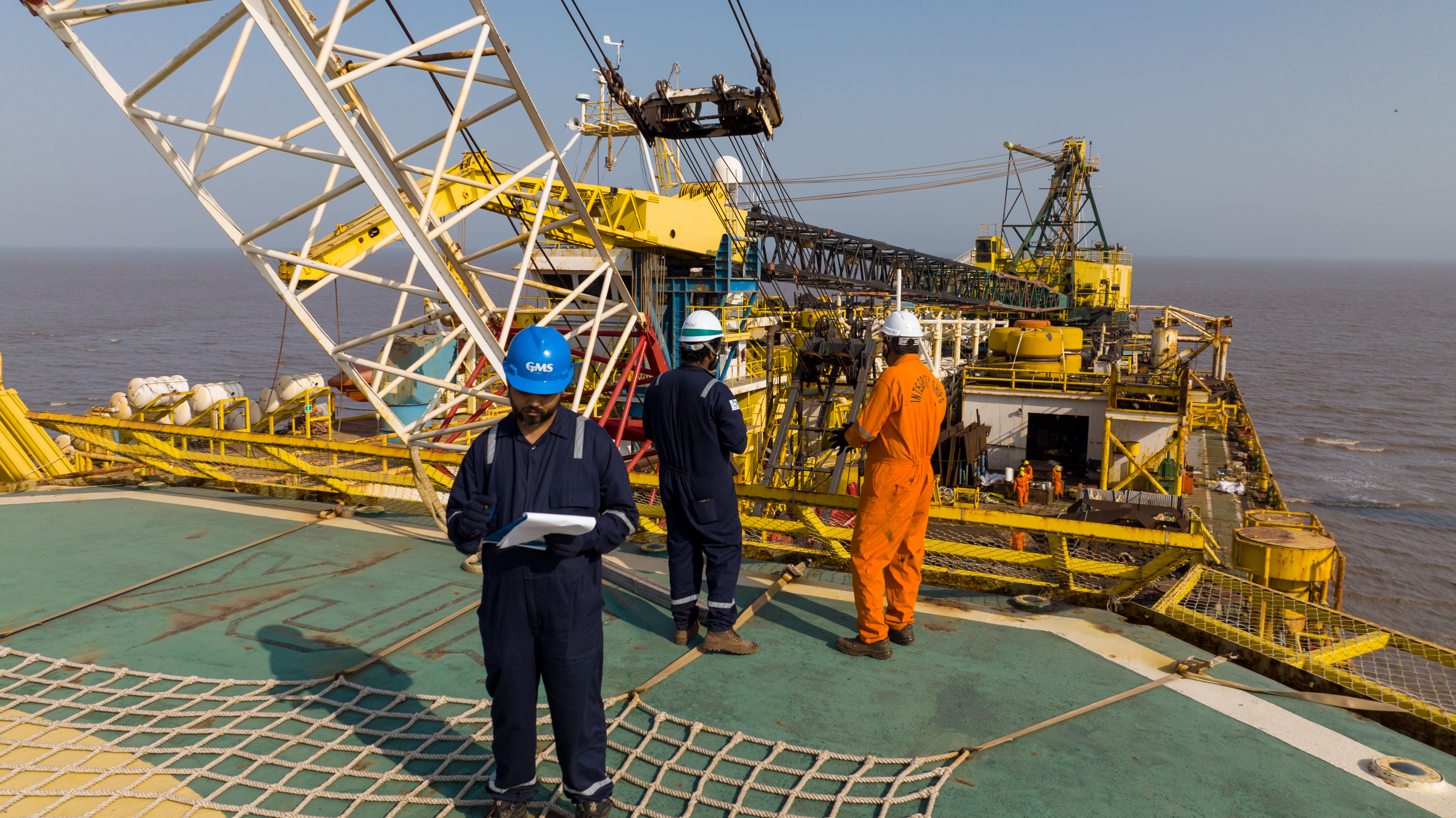
Sustainable Ship and Offshore Recycling Program team conducting safety inspections as part of safe recycling of offshore assets in Hong Kong Convention–complaint yards in India

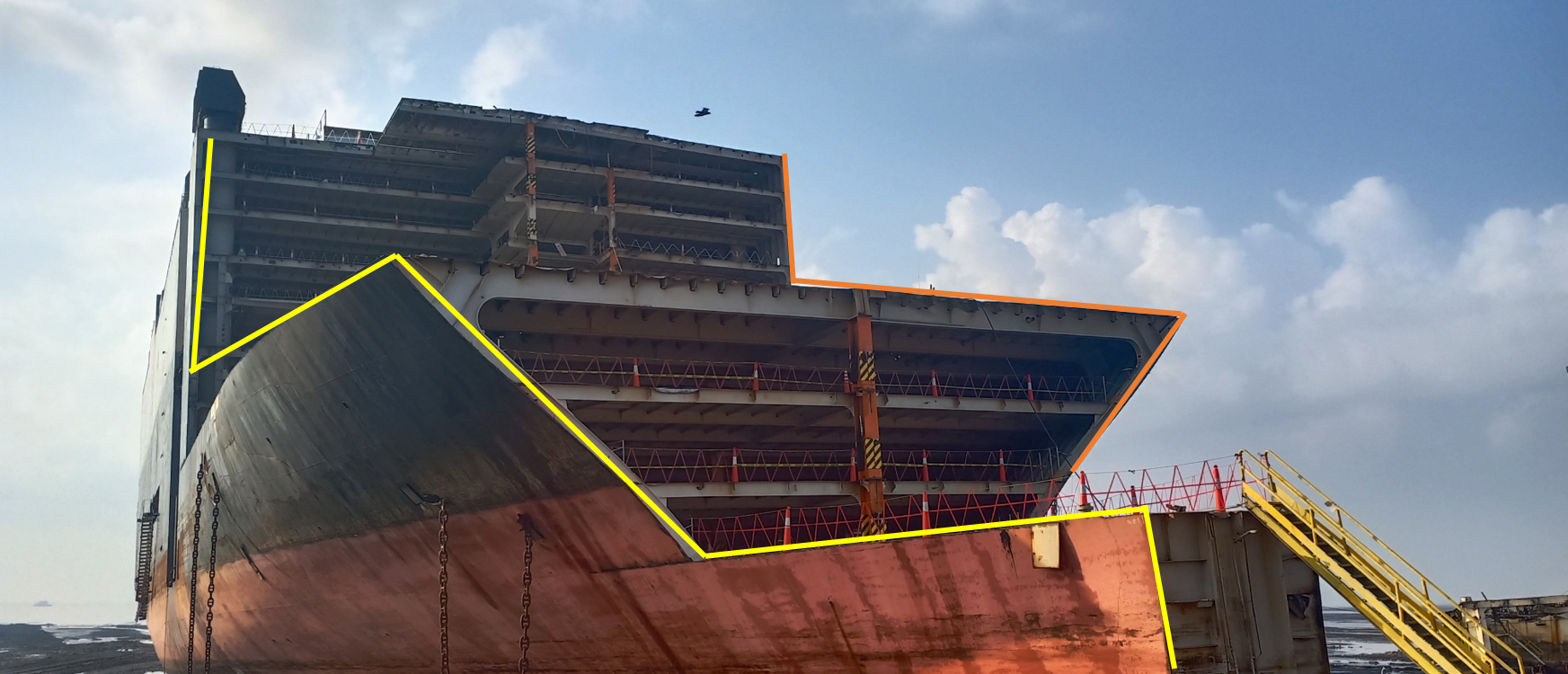
Beached end-of-the-life vessel cut in zig-zag for stability during ship recycling

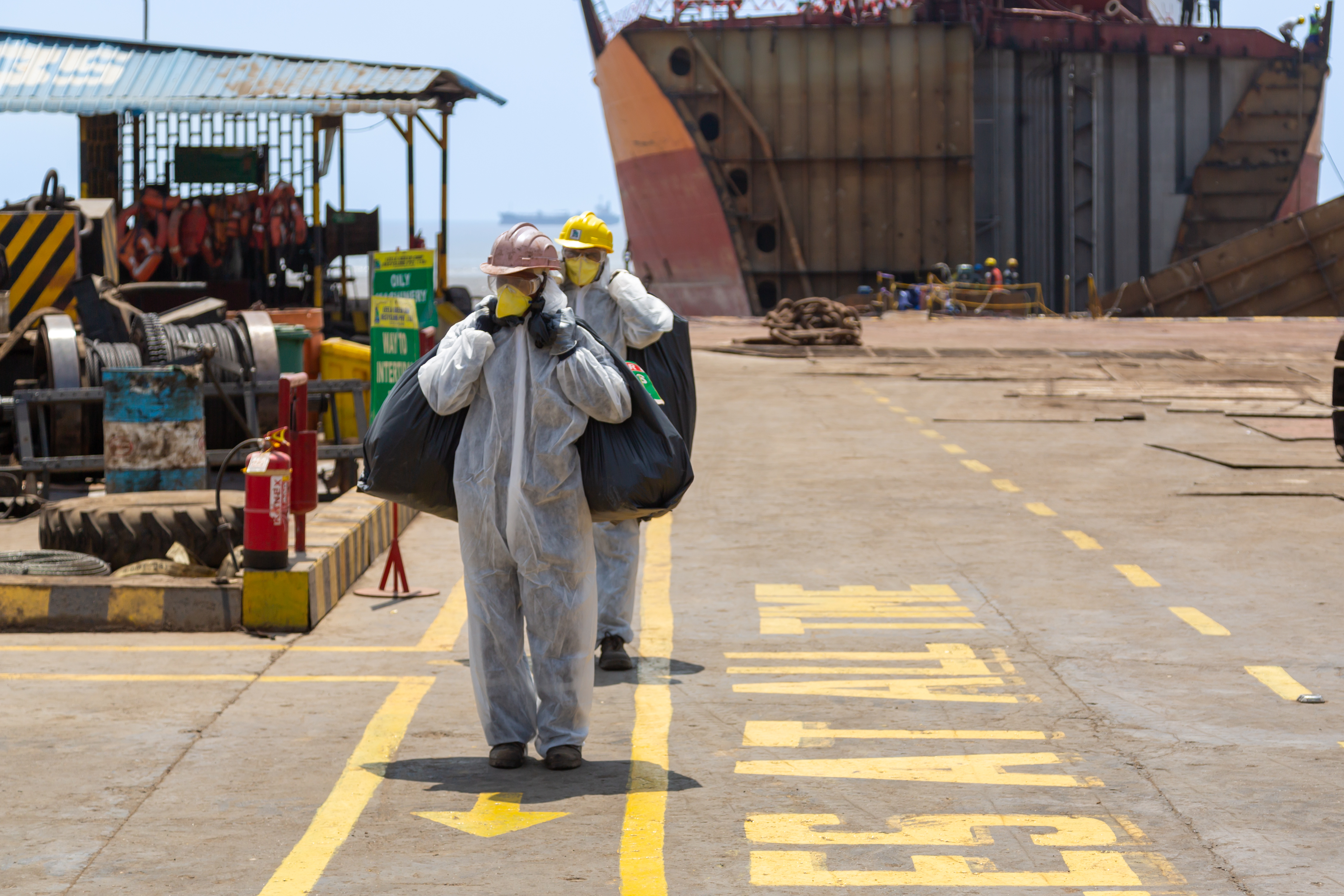
Safe removal of Hazardous material in Ship Recycling yard in India

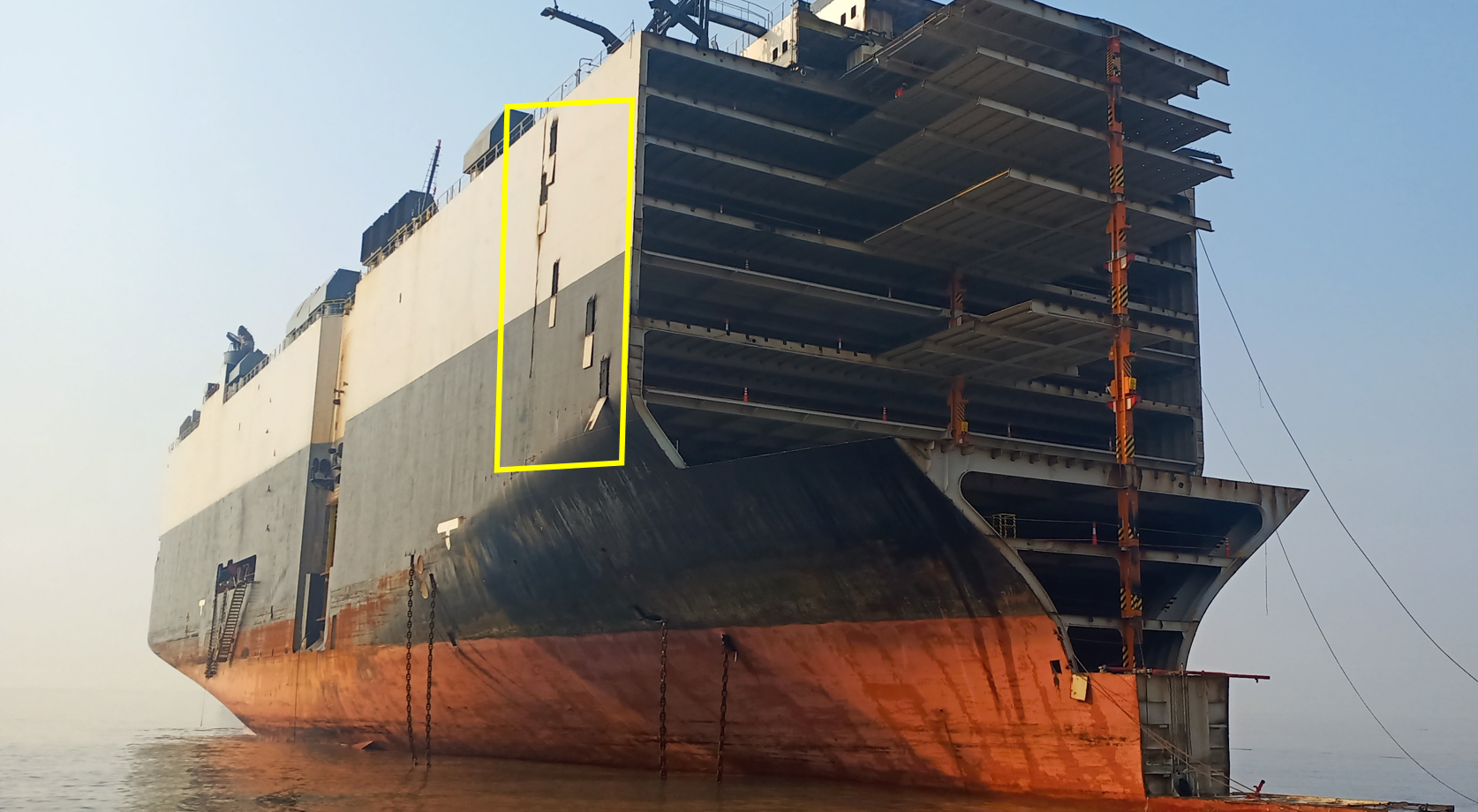
Window cut for ventilation and illumination of hull during ship recycling

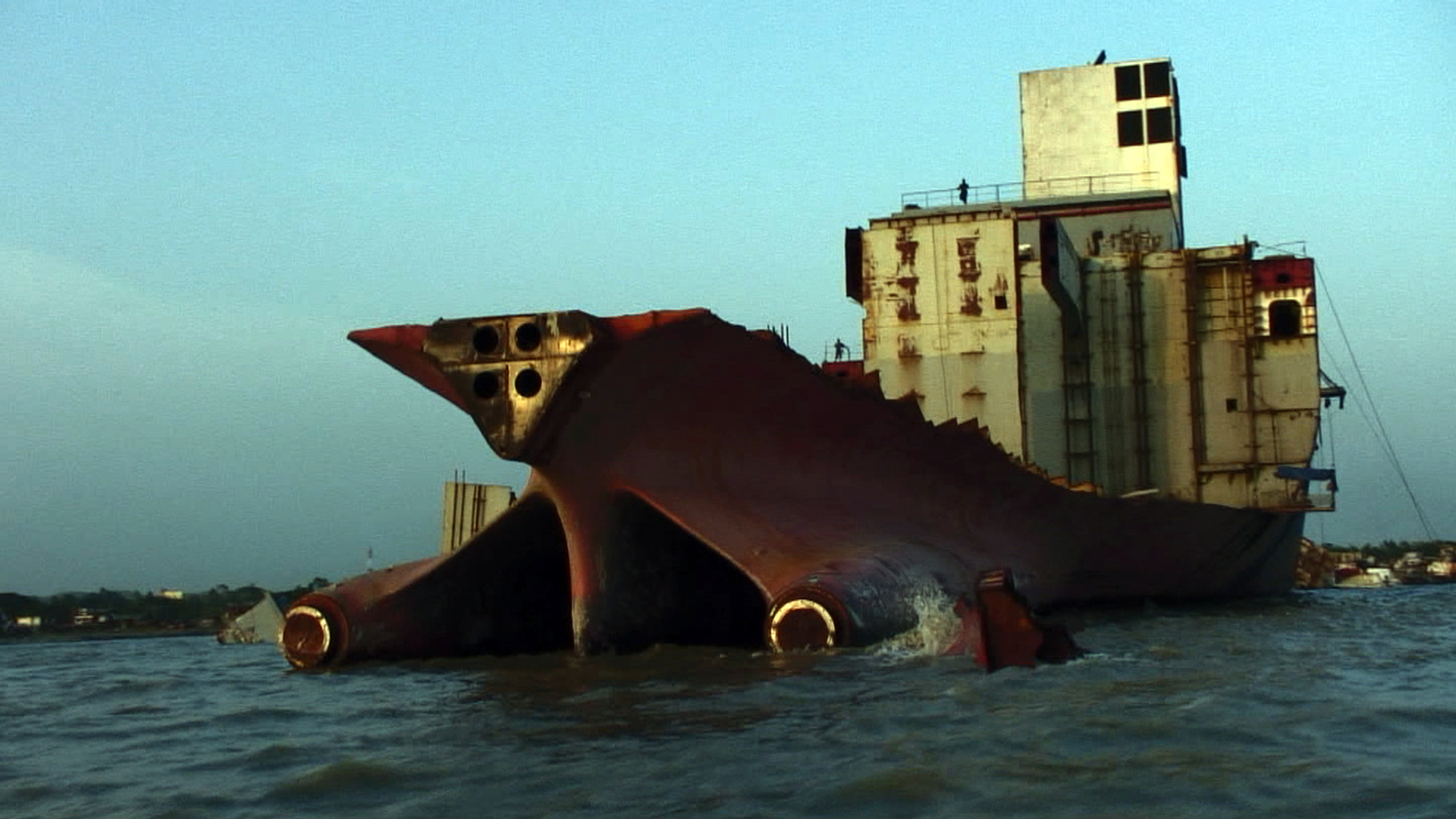
Jafrabad Chittagong ship breaking

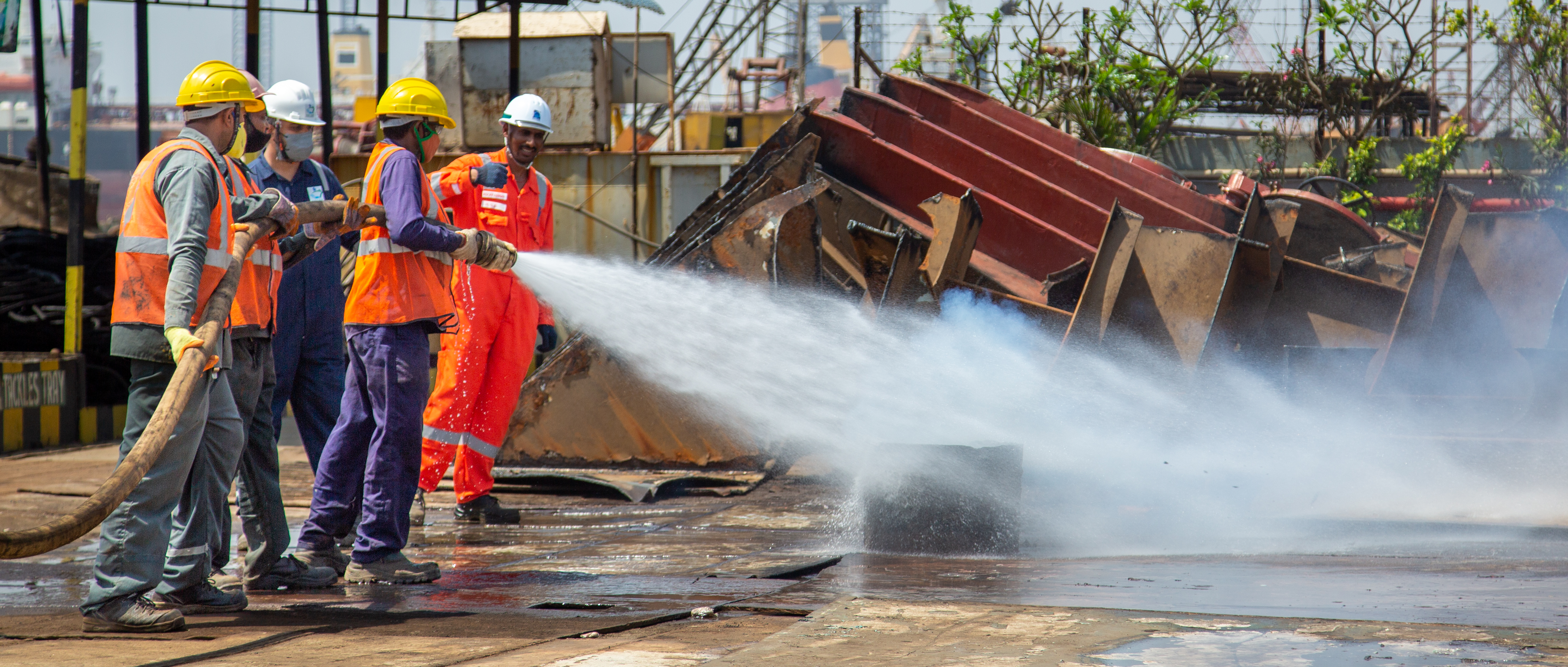
Firefighting mock drill at ship recycling yard in Alang, India

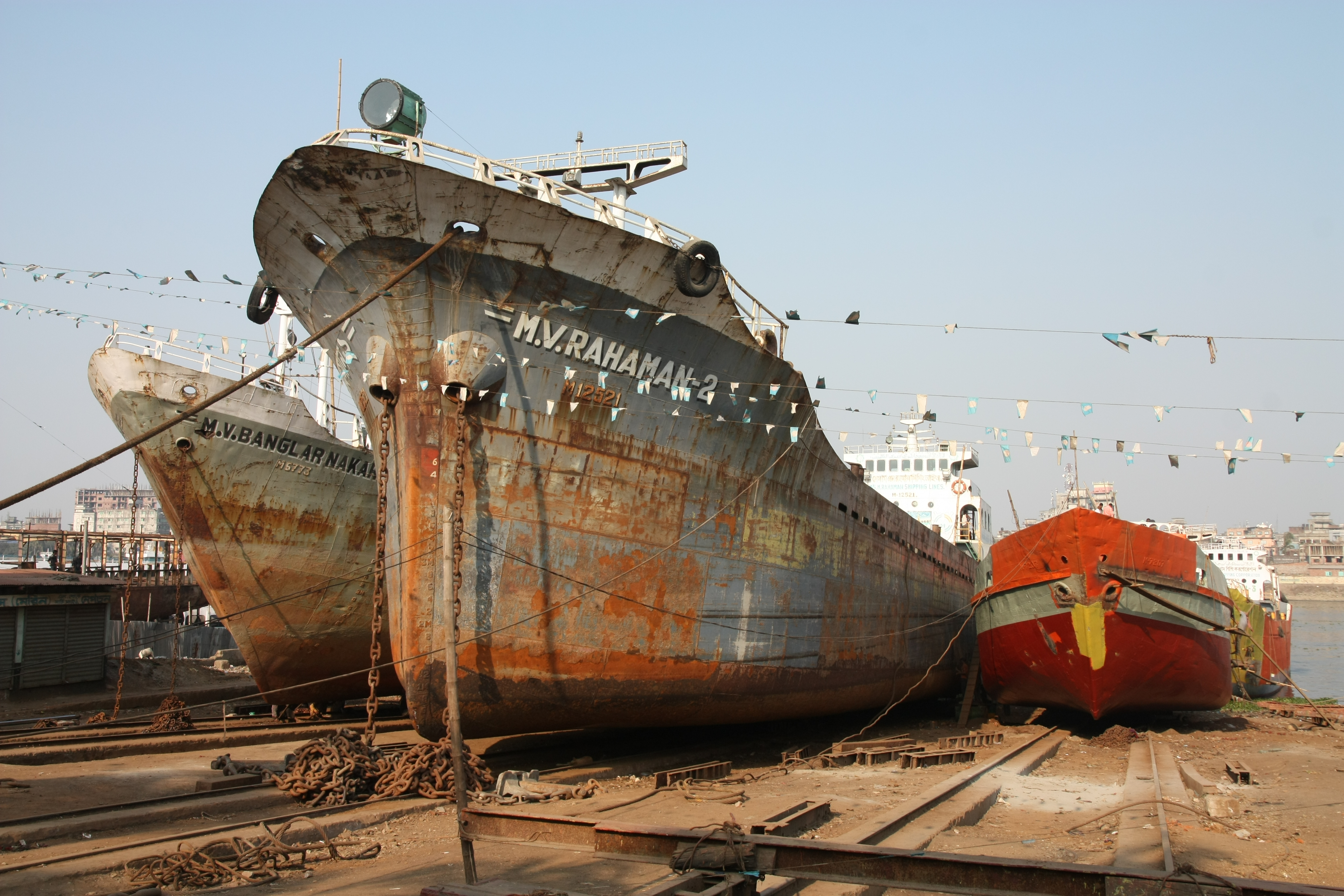
Dhaka shipyard on Buriganga River

End-of-life chemical tanker being dismantled during ship recycling operations at a modern ship recycling yard in Alang, Gujarat, India.

Aerial view of a Hong Kong Convention-compliant ship recycling yard in Chattogram (Chittagong), Bangladesh, showing vessels, recycling infrastructure and designated working areas.

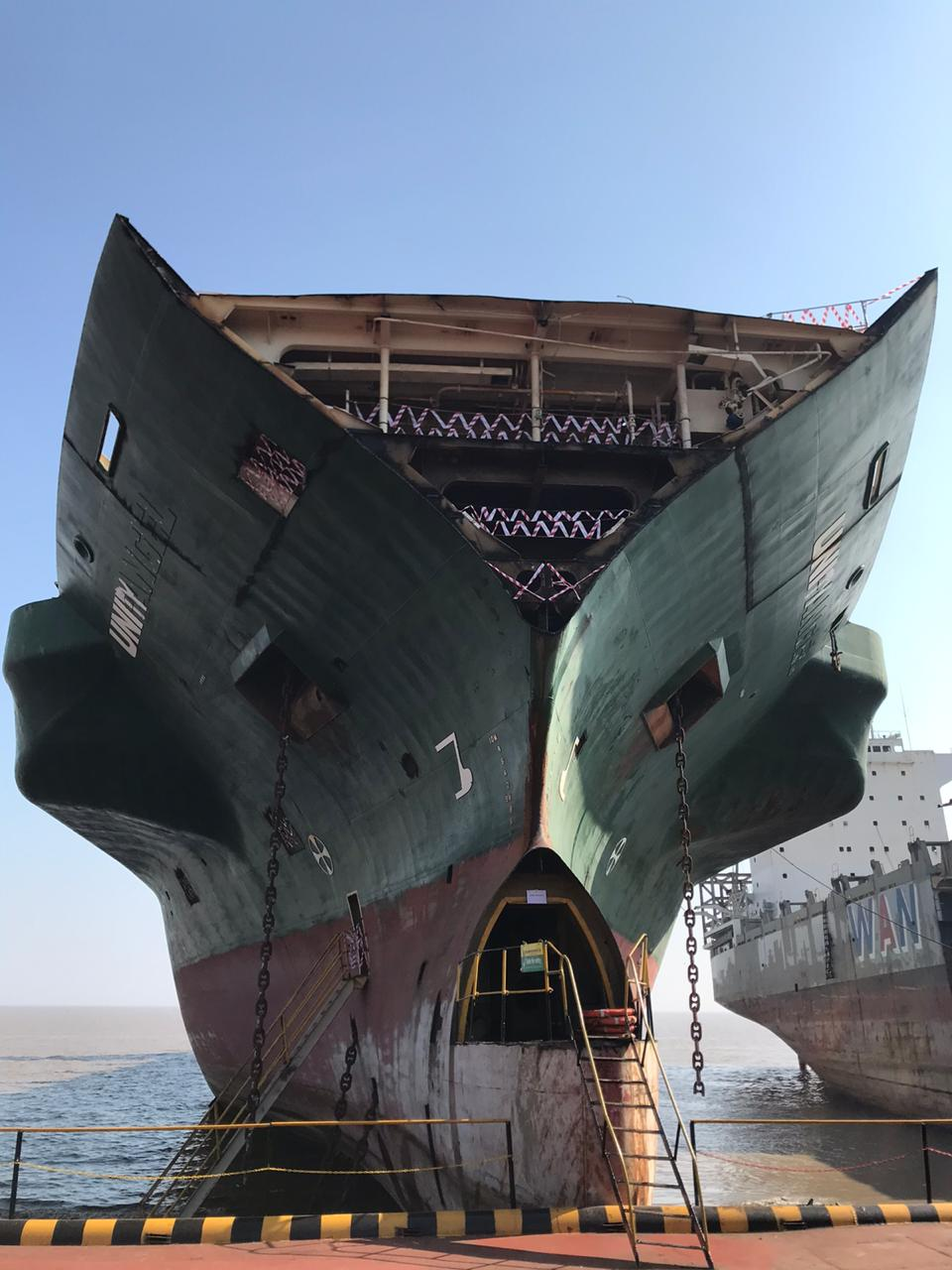
Safe access to beached vessel in Alang

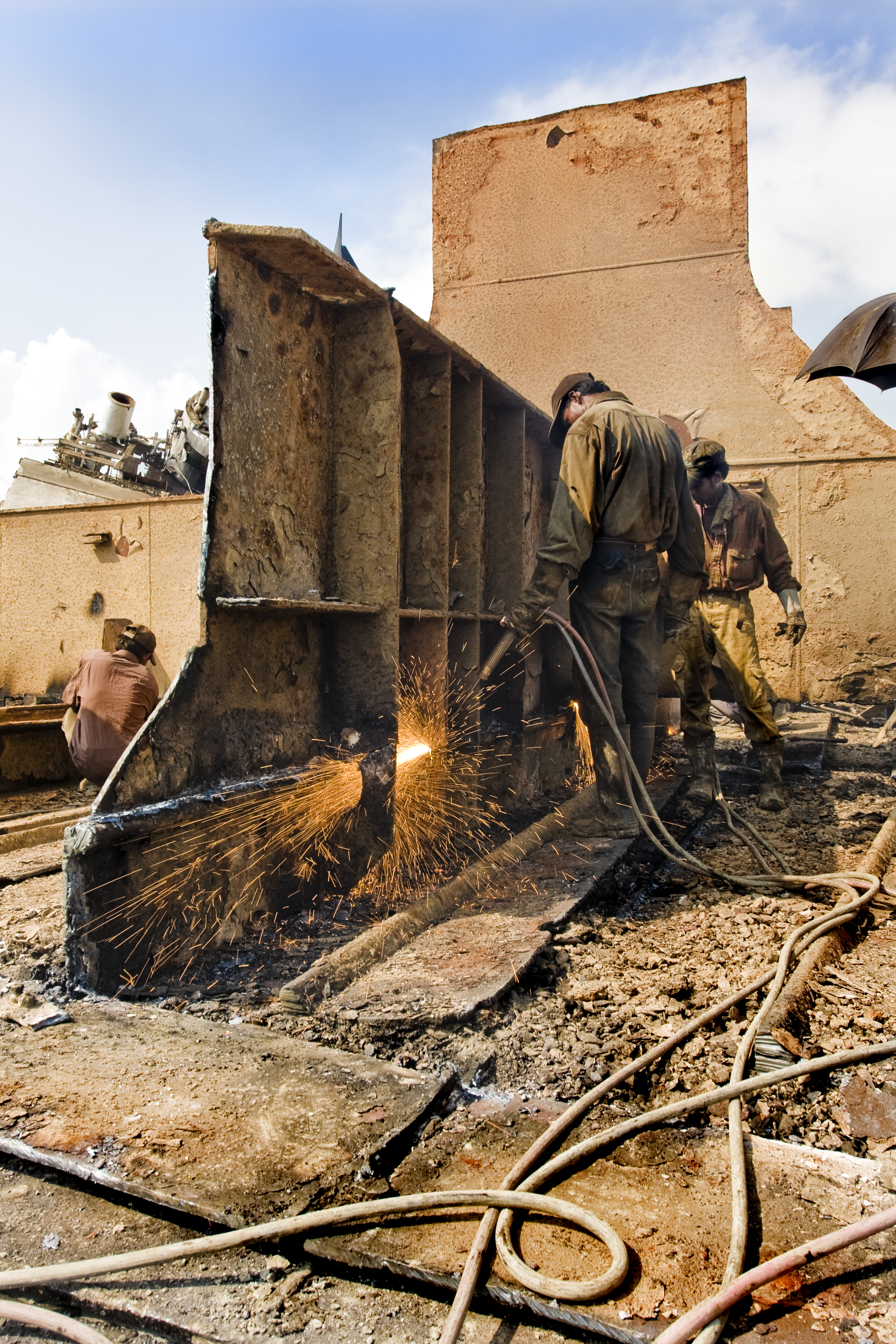
Chittagong Ship Breaking Yard

Bulk carrier undergoing dismantling and recycling at a ship recycling yard in Chattogram (Chittagong), Bangladesh.

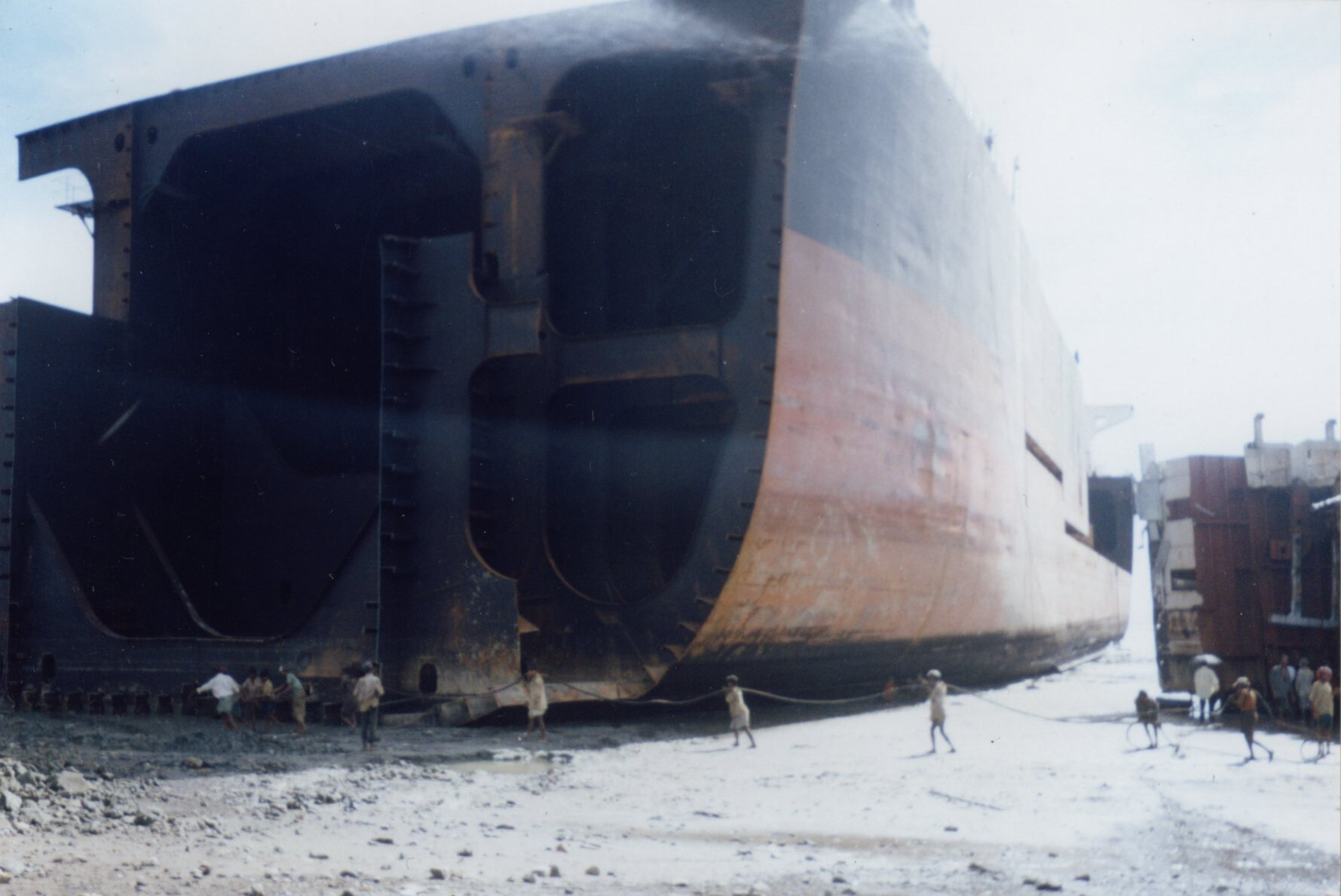
Ship-breaking in Sitakunda

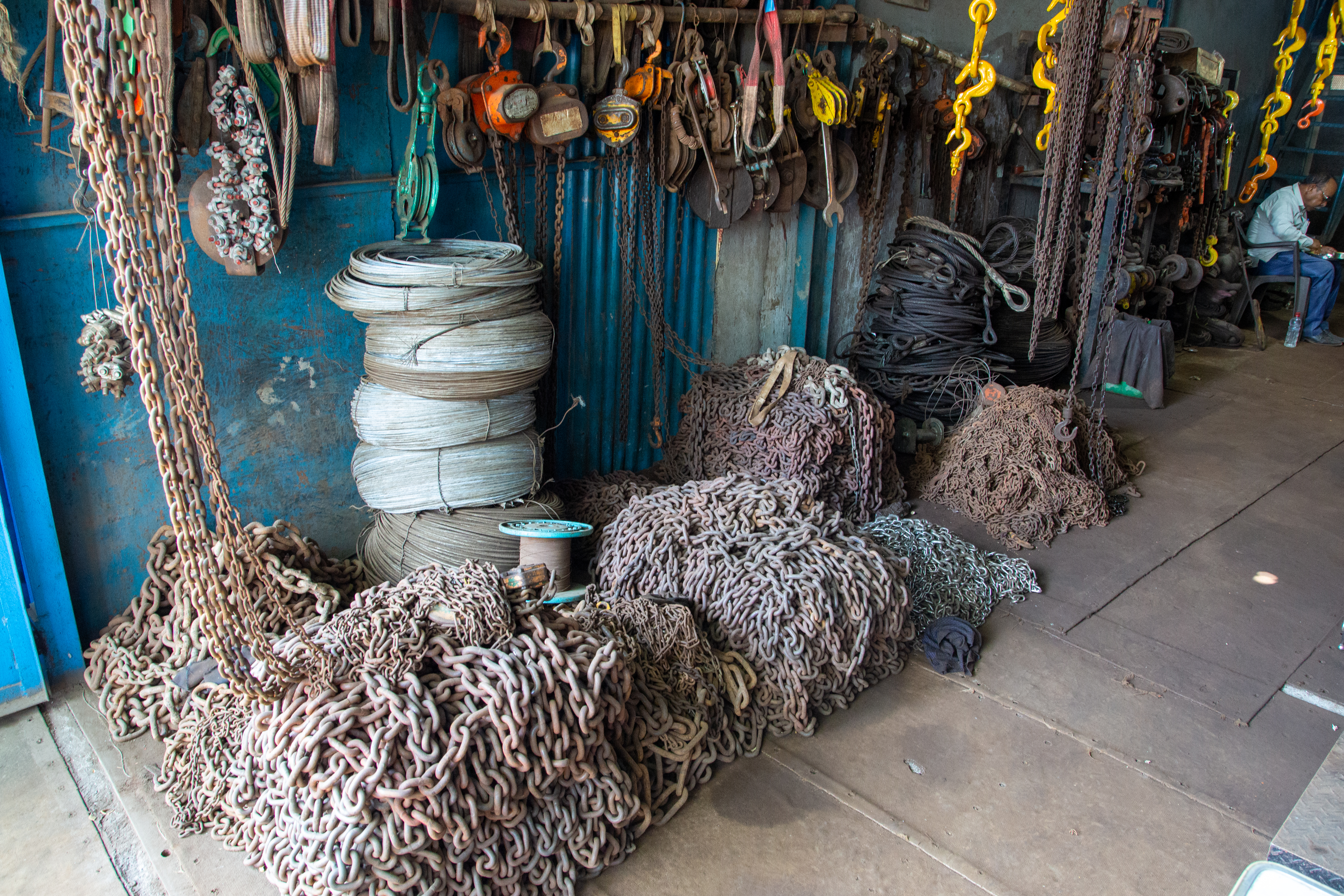
Indian second-hand shop selling used spare parts recovered during ship recycling

== See also ==
- Bo'ness
- Clemenceau disposal controversy
- Flotsam, jetsam, lagan and derelict
- Marine debris
- Marine pollution
- Shipbreakers (film), by the National Film Board of Canada
- Ship decommissioning
- Ship Breaker, a young-adult novel by Paolo Bacigalupi
- Scrap
- Wrecking (shipwreck)
- List of dry docks
- List of the largest shipbuilding companies
- List of shipbuilders and shipyards
- Hardspace: Shipbreaker, a video game based on the ship breaking profession set in space
- Israel Shipyards
