= Colbeck =

Colbeck may refer to:

== People with the surname ==
- Craig Turnbull, Lord Colbeck, Scottish judge
- James Colbeck (1801–1852), English stonemason who worked on the Ross Bridge, Tasmania
- Joe Colbeck (born 1986), English athlete in football
- Julian Colbeck (born 1952), English musician and businessman
- Patrick Colbeck (born 1965), American politician
- Richard Colbeck (born 1958), Australian politician
- Toby Colbeck (Leonard George ("Toby") Colbeck; 1884–1918), English first-class cricketer
- William Colbeck (gangster) (1890–1943), US politician and organized crime figure
- William Colbeck (seaman) (1871–1930), British seaman who distinguished himself on 2 Antarctic expeditions
- William Henry Colbeck (1823–1901), New Zealand politician

== Places or other uses ==
- Cape Colbeck in Antarctica
- Colbeck, Ontario
- Colbeck Archipelago in Antarctica
- Colbeck Basin in Antarctica
- Colbeck Bay in Antarctica

== See also ==
- John Macleod of Colbecks
