= USS Compass Island =

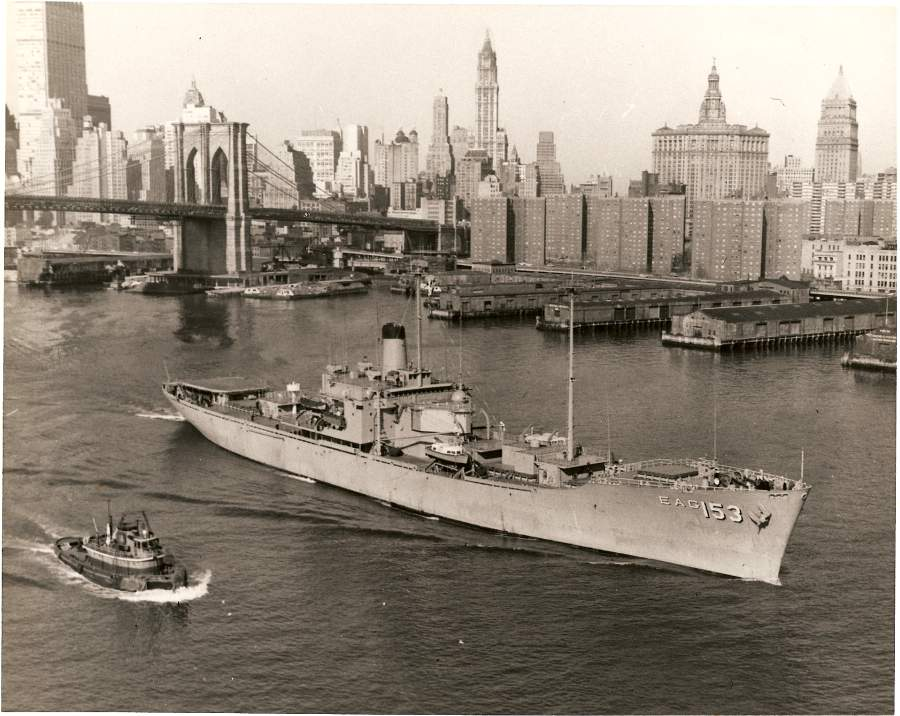

History

United States
- Name: USS Compass Island (AG-153)
- Namesake: An island in Penobscot Bay off the coast of Maine
- Builder: New York Shipbuilding Corporation
- Launched: 24 October 1953 as Garden Mariner
- Acquired: 29 March 1956
- Commissioned: 3 December 1956
- Decommissioned: 1 May 1980
- Stricken: 31 March 1986
- Identification: IMO number: 8628339
- Fate: Maritime Administration 9 April 1993
- Status: National Defense Reserve Fleet

General characteristics
- Class & type: Compass Island
- Displacement: 18,000 tons (full)
- Length: 563 ft (172 m)
- Beam: 76 ft (23 m)
- Draft: 26 ft (7.9 m)
- Speed: 20 knots
- Complement: 214

USS Compass Island (AG-153) circa 1972

Compass Island (EAG-153) was launched 24 October 1953 as Garden Mariner by the New York Shipbuilding Corporation, Camden, New Jersey and sponsored by Mrs. H. A. Smith. Acquired by the Navy 29 March 1956 and commissioned 3 December 1956.

Compass Island was one of two ships, the other being USS Observation Island (E-AG-154), converted and classified as navigational research test vessels under the Polaris Missile system budget. Compass Island's conversion was at an estimated cost of $19,600,000. The ship's mission was to assist in the development and evaluation of a navigation system independent of shore-based and celestial aids, a necessary adjunct of the ballistic missile program. She operated along the eastern seaboard testing equipment and training personnel until 13 March 1958 when she sailed from New York for experiments in the Mediterranean, returning to New York 17 April to resume her east coast operations. A dramatic example of her work was provided when USS Nautilus (SSN-571), using the Shipboard Inertial Navigation System (SINS) first tested by Compass Island in 1957, made a submerged cruise beneath the Arctic ice pack, touching exactly at the North Pole on 3 August 1958. The INS hardware was the N6A-1 built by North American Aviation, a naval modification of the N6A designed for the Navaho cruise missile. It had also been installed on the USS Skate (SSN-578), along with the Nautilus, following successful sea trials on the Compass Island. USS Skate reached the North Pole the week after Nautilus, and in the following year became the first vessel to surface at the North Pole.

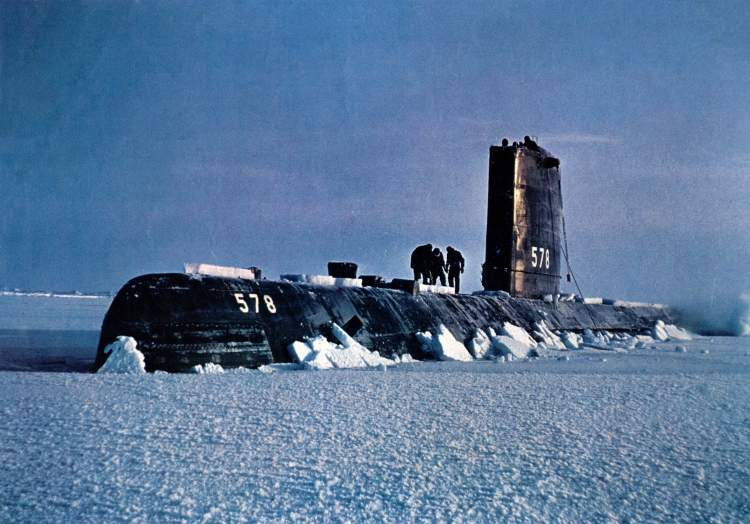
North Pole navigation succeeded after initial INS testing on the Compass Island.

On 10 September 1958, Compass Island entered New York Naval Shipyard for overhaul and installation of additional navigational equipment to be tested. With this new equipment, she continued her east coast and Caribbean cruising through 1960.

In 2003, Compass Island and three other decommissioned US Navy ships, USS Caloosahatchee (AO-98), USS Canopus (AS-34), and USS Canisteo (AO-99), were towed to a dry dock site at Graythorp near the port city of Hartlepool in the United Kingdom to be scrapped, but UK environmentalists protested their arrival at Able UK, the salvage company.

Work to dismantle a controversial fleet of former US warships was slated to begin in the summer of 2008, five years after the company originally won the scrapping contract.

== Sources ==
- http://www.hartlepoolmail.co.uk/news/Dry-dock-for-ghost-ships.4352232.jp
- 'Ghost Ships' Haunt a Fading Port
- Foreign Relations of the United States, 1961–1963, Volume VIII, National Security Policy – Office of the Historian
