= Haggitt Pillar =

Sea stack in the South Pacific Ocean

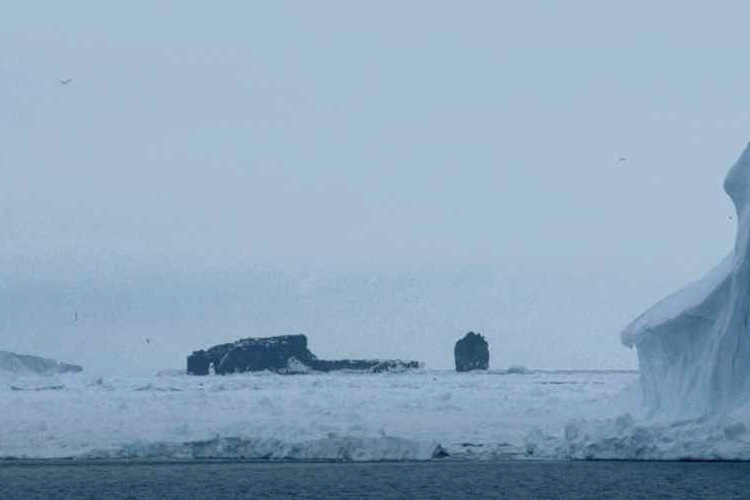
- Scott Island and Haggitt Pillar

- Location within Antarctica

Geography
- Location: Antarctica
- Coordinates: 67°24′S 179°55′W
- Area: 0.2 ha (0.49 acres)
- Length: 165 ft (50.3 m)
- Width: 165 ft (50.3 m)

Administration
- Administered under the Antarctic Treaty System

Demographics
- Population: 0

Haggitt Pillar is a stack 54 metres (177 ft) high in the South Pacific Ocean at the northwestern edge of the Ross Sea, lying 250 metres (820 ft) west of Scott Island. The pair of islands are 583 kilometres (362 mi) north-northeast of Cape Adare, Victoria Land, Antarctica. It measures 50 metres (55 yd) in diameter, yielding an area of less than 0.2 hectares (0.5 acres).

It was discovered on 25 December 1902 by Captain William Colbeck, Royal Navy Reserve, commander of the SY Morning, relief ship to the British National Antarctic Expedition (BrNAE), 1901–1904, under Robert Falcon Scott. The name was used on official charts of the BrNAE drawn by Lieutenant George F.A. Mulock.

== See also ==
- Composite Antarctic Gazetteer
- List of Antarctic islands south of 60° S
- Scientific Committee on Antarctic Research
- Scott Island
- Territorial claims in Antarctica
