= Hamilton Glacier =

Hamilton Glacier is the name of two glaciers in the Ross Dependency:

- Hamilton Glacier (Shackleton Coast)
- Hamilton Glacier (Edward VII Peninsula)
