= Incheon (disambiguation) =

Incheon or Inchon may refer to:

- Incheon, a metropolitan city in South Korea
- Incheon International Airport, the largest airport in South Korea
- Inchon (film), a 1981 film directed by Terence Young
- Battle of Inchon, an invasion and battle during the Korean War
- USS Inchon (LPH-12), an amphibious assault ship of the US Navy.
- Incheon-class frigate, a coastal defense class of frigates of the Republic of Korea Navy
- Kim Seong-su, South Korean educator, activist and Vice President (1951-52) also known by the art name Inchon

== See also ==
- Revised Romanization of Korean, for explanation of the two spellings
