= USS Canisteo =

Oiler of the United States Navy

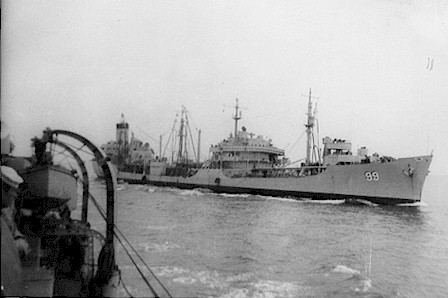
- USS Canisteo (AO-99) in the Mediterranean, 1951

History

United States
- Name: USS Canisteo
- Namesake: The Canisteo River in New York
- Ordered: as T3-S2-A1 tanker hull, MC hull 2561
- Laid down: 11 November 1944
- Launched: 6 July 1945
- Commissioned: 3 December 1945
- Decommissioned: 2 October 1989
- Stricken: 31 August 1992
- Identification: IMO number: 8628327
- Fate: Sold for scrap to Able UK and towed to Hartlepool UK, 2003. Scrapping complete, August 2010.

General characteristics
- Class & type: Cimarron-class oiler
- Displacement: 7,470 t.(lt) 25,450 t.(fl) as built; 16,500 t. (lt) 36,500 t.(fl) Jumboized
- Length: 553 ft (169 m) as built; 664 ft (202 m) Jumboized
- Beam: 75 ft (23 m)
- Draught: 32 ft (9.8 m)
- Propulsion: steam turbines, four boilers, two shafts, 13,500 shp (10,100 kW) , twin screws, 30,400 hp (22,700 kW)
- Speed: 18 knots (33 km/h)
- Capacity: 146,000 barrels (23,200 m^{3})
- Complement: 22 officers, 362 enlisted
- Armament: As built; 1 × 1 5-inch/38 DP; 4 × 1 3-inch/50 DP; 4 × 2 40 mm Bofors AA; 4 × 2 20 mm AA; As decommissioned; 2 × 1 3-inch/50 DP

USS Canisteo (AO-99) was a Cimarron-class fleet oiler constructed for the United States Navy in the closing days of World War II. Commissioned too late for service in that conflict, she had a lengthy career in the Cold War that followed. She was the only U.S. Navy ship to bear the name Canisteo, after the Canisteo River in New York.

Canisteo (AO-99) was launched 6 July 1945 by Bethlehem Steel-Sparrows Point Shipyard, Inc., Sparrows Point, Maryland, under a United States Maritime Commission contract; sponsored by Mrs. J. N. Chambers; and commissioned 3 December 1945.

== Service history ==
=== Post-World War II operations ===
Canisteo cleared Norfolk 4 February 1946 for Melville, Rhode Island, where she loaded diesel oil for naval units taking part in the occupation of Germany. Returning from Bremerhaven and Farge, Germany, she carried out training operations in the Caribbean, and then sailed to Iceland and Greenland, returning to New York City 27 May.

=== Participating in Antarctic exercises ===
The tanker sailed south from Norfolk 27 November 1946 as a unit of Operation Highjump, the largest Antarctic expedition to that time. Steaming through the Panama Canal to the Antarctic, Canisteo reached Scott and Peter Islands and provided critical logistic support for this historic exploratory and scientific project, carrying on the Navy's traditional role in expanding man's frontiers. Canisteo returned to Norfolk 23 April 1947 after calling at Rio de Janeiro and Caribbean ports.

=== North Atlantic operations ===
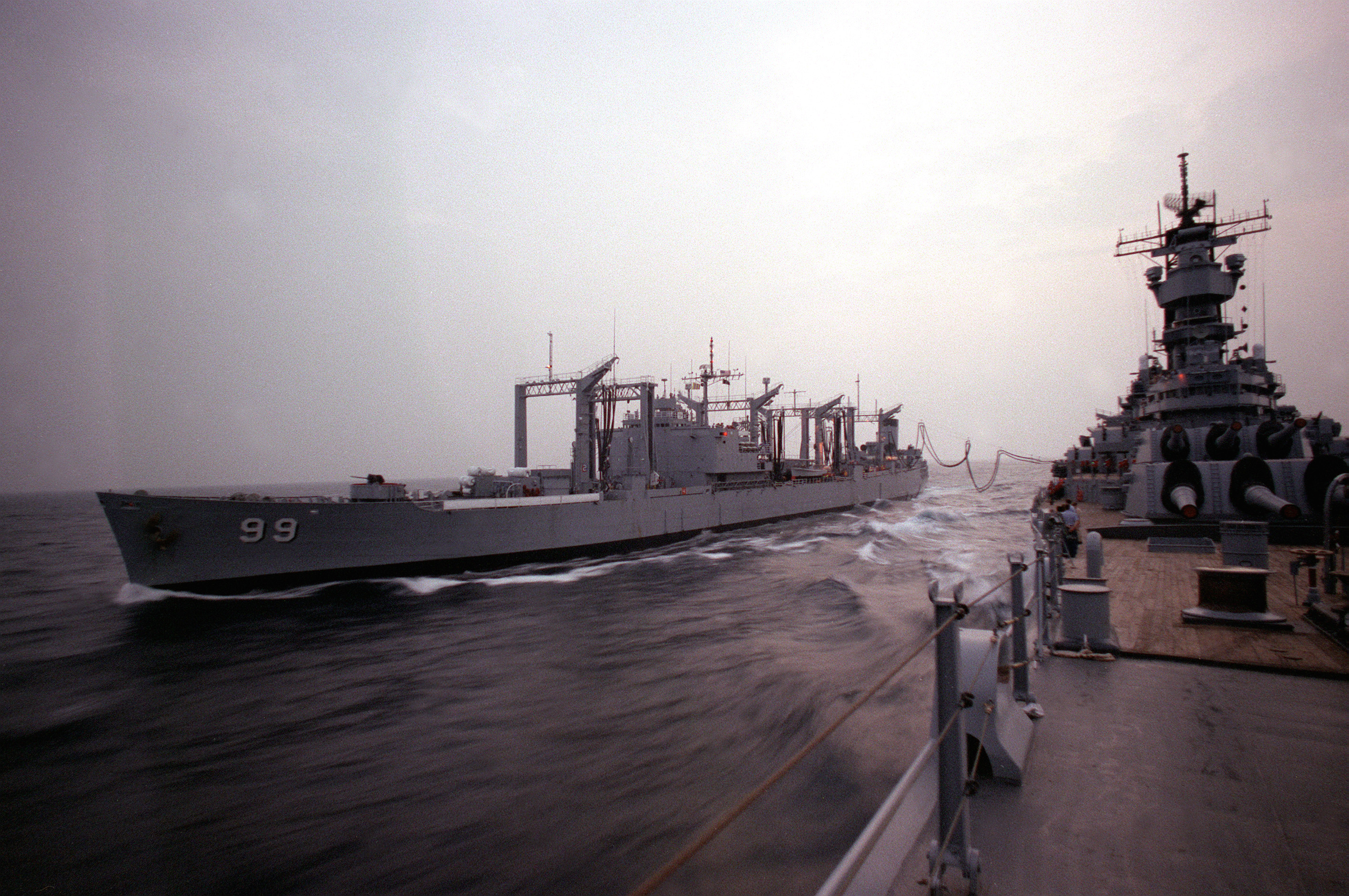
Canisteo's appearance after her jumboization in the 1960s.

Between 4 June 1947 and 23 October 1948, Canisteo served four tours of duty supporting the United States Sixth Fleet by carrying oil from Bahrain to the Mediterranean. The winter and spring of 1948–1949 found Canisteo operating on fueling duty from Norfolk, Virginia, to Caribbean ports; Argentia, Newfoundland; and Grønnedal, Greenland. A pattern of alternating exercises in the Caribbean with overhauls and tours of duty in the Mediterranean in the following years was highlighted by her fueling in support of many fleet exercises.

She played a part in augmenting the growing strength of the North Atlantic Treaty Organization through Operation Mainbrace (26 August-11 October 1952) and in combined operations with Canadian forces (16–20 September 1956). The first shipboard test of the Ships Inertial Navigation System (SINS) was conducted aboard Canisteo during a 15-day Mediterranean cruise. Active with the Fleet, Canisteo continued to operate out of Norfolk through 1960, participating in fleet and NATO exercises.

Between 1966 and 1968 Canisteo, along with her sister ships Ashtabula and Caloosahatchee, underwent "jumboization". A 400-foot (120 m) midsection, built entirely new from the keel up, was inserted and welded between her original bow and stern. This replaced the old 310-foot (94 m) midsection and increased the vessel's liquid cargo capacity by over one-third. Her new configuration closely resembled that of a more modern type of ship, the replenishment oiler.

Morale on the ship was poor in the late 1970s. Recruiters for the early all-volunteer US Navy were fairly desperate for inductees, and this showed nowhere more clearly than in the crew of Canisteo. In 1979 she returned from a tour of duty in the Mediterranean to Norfolk, Virginia (her home port). So many men went AWOL that she could not return to sea on schedule, the first time that had happened to a US Navy ship since the Revolutionary War. The afore mentioned claim is disputed by Capt. T. E. Shanahan, Commanding Officer 1978–1980, in a YouTube video "https://www.youtube.com/watch?v=CHlowLNuBjI" Published on 31 May 2012, wherein he says defense spending cuts were to blame for the ship not deploying on time in 1979, but there was more to the story than he is telling.

In the late summer early fall of 1978 the Canisteo was on deployment in the Caribbean and morale on the ship was so poor that 3 men jumped overboard at sea within 2 days. All 3 were recovered. The ship was immediately returned to port in Norfolk, Virginia and just days out from port a Naval investigating team was helicoptered onboard to investigate the incidents. The ship’s captain and about half of the crew were replaced and the Canisteo was deployed on the unscheduled Mediterranean cruise of 1978–1979.

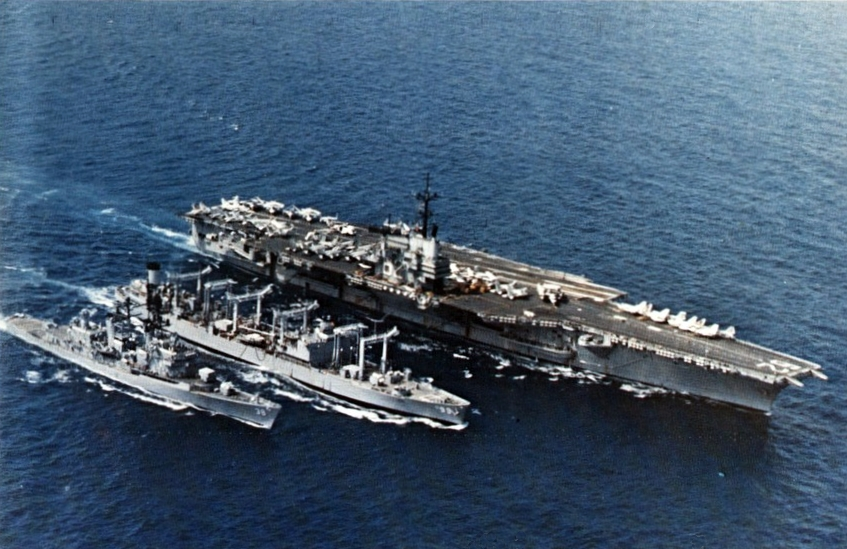
Canisteo refueling USS Independence and USS Luce, 1981

Canisteo recovered from this notoriety in the 1980s by participating in Caribbean operations from January 1982 through January 1983, North Atlantic and NATO operations from January through April 1983, and in law enforcement operations in support of the War on Drugs in the Caribbean, August 1985 through January 1986. At the end of the law enforcement operations, Canisteo participated in wreckage recovery operations off the coast of Florida for the Space Shuttle Challenger disaster.

== Decommissioning and disposal ==
Canisteo decommissioned 2 October 1989 and was struck from the Naval Vessel Register, 31 August 1992. She was transferred to the Maritime Administration for lay up in the National Defense Reserve Fleet, James River, Fort Eustis, Virginia. Canisteo was sold for scrapping to Able UK, Hartlepool, Teesside, England, and removed from the Reserve Fleet under tow, arriving in the United Kingdom on 13 November 2003.

Canisteo and three other decommissioned US Navy ships, Caloosahatchee,Canopus and Compass Island all arrived at Able UK under the same contract and came to be known as the "Hartlepool Four". Local protests and legal challenges, alleging unacceptable amounts of toxic substances contained on and in the vessels, delayed scrapping until Able UK secured the appropriate waste management licensing in August 2008.

Scrapping of Canisteo finally commenced in March 2010 and was completed by August 2010.

== Military honors and awards ==
Canisteo's crew were authorized the following medals:

- Navy Battle "E" Ribbon
- American Campaign Medal
- European–African–Middle Eastern Campaign Medal
- World War II Victory Medal
- Navy Occupation Service Medal (with Europe clasp)
- National Defense Service Medal (2)
- Antarctic Service Medal
- Armed Forces Expeditionary Medal (1-Cuba, 1-Dominican Republic)
- Coast Guard Meritorious Unit Commendation (2)
