= Hamilton Glacier (Edward VII Peninsula) =

Glacier in Antarctica

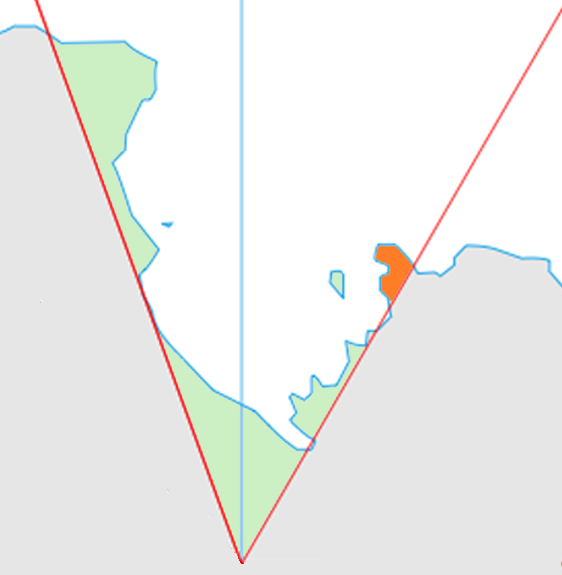
- Location of King Edward VII Land (marked in orange) within the Ross Dependency

- Location within Antarctica
- Location: King Edward VII Land
- Coordinates: 77°33′S 157°25′W
- Length: 5 nmi (9 km; 6 mi)
- Thickness: unknown
- Terminus: Cape Colbeck
- Status: unknown

Hamilton Glacier is a glacier about 5 nautical miles (9 km) long draining northwest from Edward VII Peninsula south of Cape Colbeck, Antarctica. It was named by the Advisory Committee on Antarctic Names after Gordon S. Hamilton of the faculty, University of Maine, who was a theoretical and field researcher of ice motion in the West Antarctic ice stream area from the 1980s.

== See also ==
- List of glaciers in the Antarctic
- Glaciology
