= Able UK =

British industrial services company

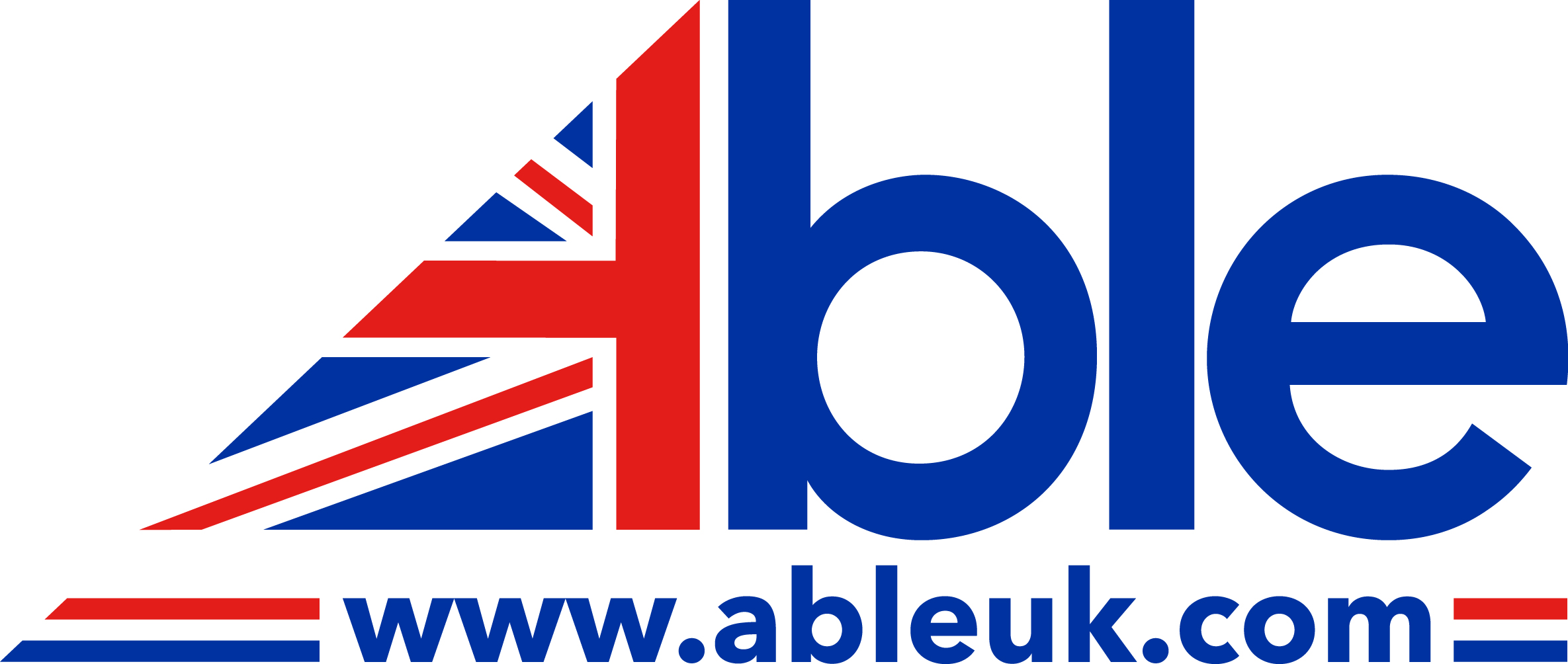

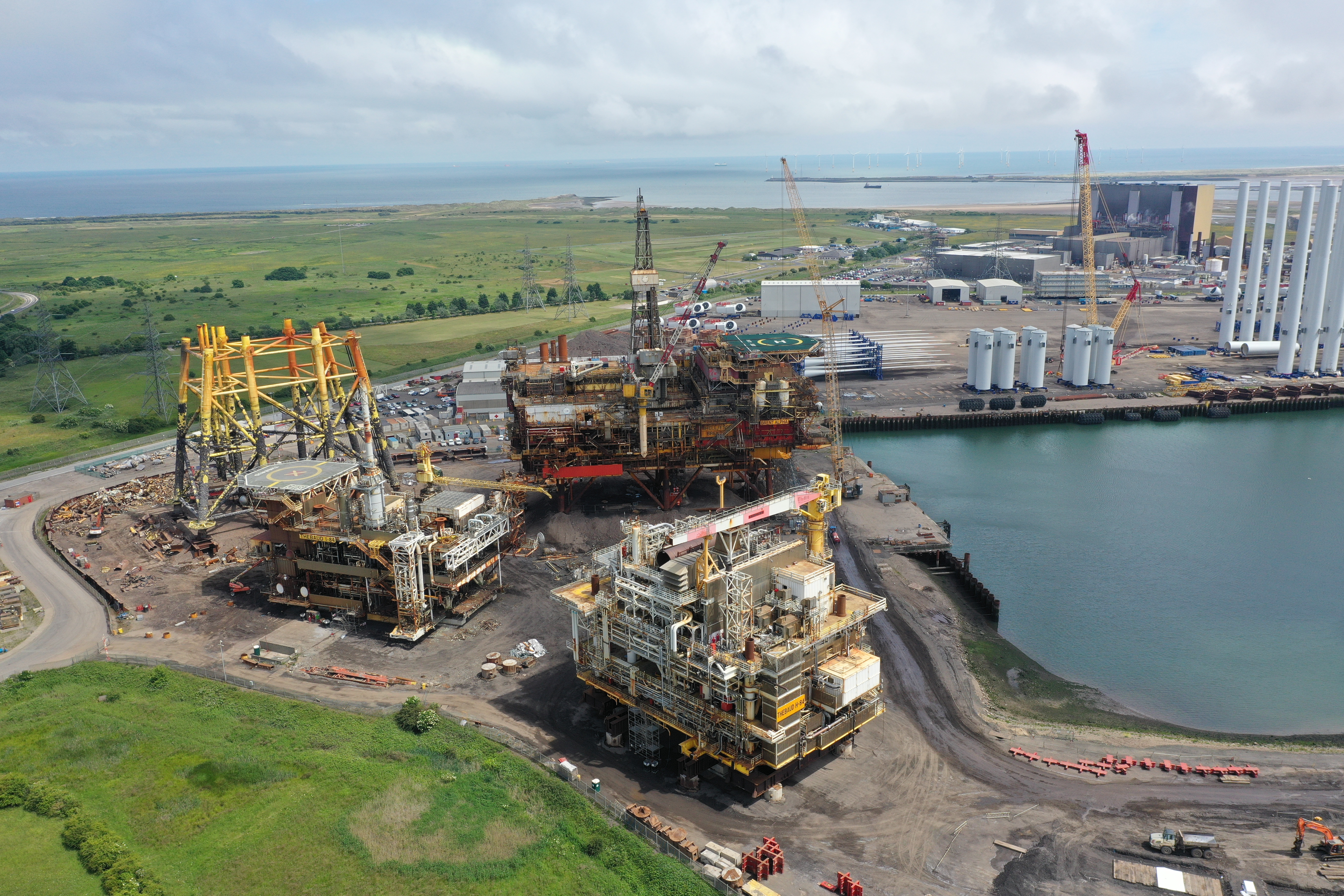
- Industry: Wind farm project ports, land developer, industrial services, ship recycling, port operations
- Founded: 1966
- Founder: Peter Stephenson
- Website: ableuk.com

Able UK is a British industrial services company specialising in decommissioning of ships and offshore installations.

== Overview ==
Able UK is a British industrial services company, operating primarily in the marine decommissioning and recycling business. As of 2014 the company has a specialised dry dock with associated decommissioning facilities including landfill at Seaton (TERRC, Teesside Environmental Reclamation & Recycling Centre) (Note: Associate company ALAB Environmental Services Ltd. operates the nearby Seaton Meadows Landfill site.) with a 120 metres (390 ft) entrance width capable of handling offshore oil equipment including steel jackets of fixed platforms, heavy-lift ships, and other large ships including aircraft carrier sized vessels. The company also undertakes general demolition work.

In addition to the dock facility at Seaton, (Note: 54.63370°N 1.19191°W, ABLE Seaton Port) Able UK also has (as of 2014) sites with port facilities at or near Billingham (Billingham Reach, (Note: Site of the former North Tees Power Station.) quay and industrial estate); (Note: 54.58738°N 1.26121°W, ABLE Billingham Reach) Port Clarence (Clarence Port, River Tees bankside development land); (Note: 54.58430°N 1.21560°W, ABLE Clarence Port) and at Middlesbrough (Middlesbrough Port, River Tees quayside north with fabrication facilities; (Note: 54.58175°N 1.22036°W, ABLE Middlesbrough Port) also at the former South Tees Recycling Centre. (Note: 54.58022°N 1.19860°W, ABLE South Tees)).

The company has non-port sites at or near (as of 2014): Barnby Dun (the former Thorpe Marsh Power Station); (Note: 53.57923°N 1.08700°W, Thorpe Marsh power station site) and at Seaton (Seaton Meadows landfill site). (Note: 54.64269°N 1.19163°W, Seaton Meadows landfill)

As of 2014 Able UK is also promoting and planning two sites in the north of Lincolnshire, near the banks of the Humber Estuary. The "ABLE Humber Port" consists of "ABLE Logistics Park" is a logistic park of nearly 500 hectares (1,200 acres), (Note: 53.67855°N 0.26185°W, ABLE Logistics ParkABLE Logistics Park) with an adjacent port development "ABLE Marine Energy Park" of over 360 hectares (890 acres) with nearly 1,400 metres (4,600 ft) of quay on the banks of the Humber Estuary. (Note: 53.65418°N 0.22886°W, ABLE Marine Energy Park) ABLE Logistics Park received planning permission in 2013. ABLE Marine Energy Park received local planning permission in 2013, and sought a Development Consent Order in 2014; a planning decision was delayed due to objections from ABP, which were judicially rejected in 2015.

== History ==
Able UK was founded in 1966 by Peter Stephenson.

In 1995 Able acquired the land of the closed Thorpe Marsh Power Station. In 1996 Able acquired the dock at Graythorp, renaming it the TERRC (Teesside Environmental Reclamation and Recycling Centre) together with the nearby Seaton Meadows landfill site.

In 2000 Able acquired a fabrication facility in Middlesbrough (formerly Davy Offshore Modules, later SLP Engineering, and Odebrecht.) renaming it Able Middlesbrough Port.

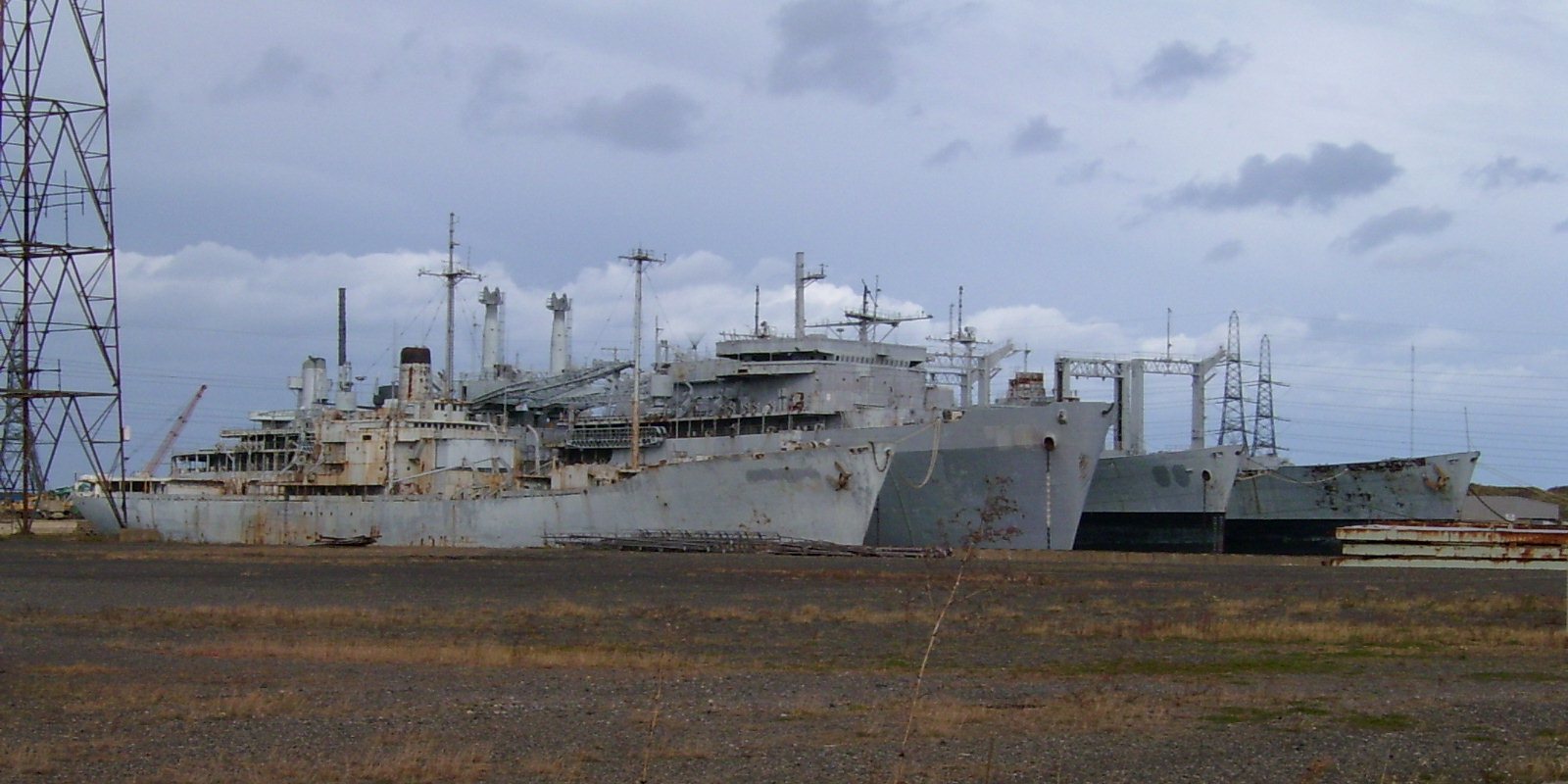
Ghost ships at Able's recycling dry dock (2004)

In 2003 the TERRC facility became the subject of controversy when Able obtained a £11 million contract from the United States Maritime Administration to dismantle 13 former US navy ships (known as the Ghost Ships). Due to the presence of asbestos and polychlorinated biphenyls in the ships the action was opposed by some Hartlepool residents and environmental groups.

Able acquired a license to carry out the work from the Environment Agency in 2008. The delays caused by the objections to the process caused Able to lose the US contract for 9 of the 13 ships. (Note: After the loss of the contract for 9 of the 13 ships, the 4 remaining ships to be processed were : USS Canopus (AS-34), USS Compass Island (AG-153), USS Canisteo (AO-99), and USS Caloosahatchee (AO-98).) In 2007 Able was fined £20,000 for failing to follow proper procedures when disposing of asbestos. By 2009 the four US ships that had been received at the site, together with the former French aircraft carrier Clemenceau, were sealed inside the dry dock, which was drained, and the ships scrapped. Other constructions decommissioned at the same time included the former jacket of an installation from the North West Hutton Oilfield. Dismantling work was completed in 2011.

The TERRC site was again the subject of a planning conflict in 2012 when Hartlepool Borough Council rejected a planning submission (to extend the height Seaton Meadows landfill) made in an attempt to prevent spontaneous combustion of refuse which had been occurring.

During 2009/2010 Able published plans for a site on the south Humber Estuary bank to provide a large logistics facility and facilities for wind farm equipment manufacture and installation; The Able Logistics Park received planning permission in 2013, The £450 million estuary side port development Able Marine Energy Park (AMEP) received planning consent in December 2013, after having been delayed due to concerns over wildlife impact. (Note: Part of the site, 111 hectares (270 acres) had already been developed by Able as a vehicle storage area in 2000.)

In 2014 proceedings for a Development Consent Order (Note: A Development Consent Order was required by the UK government for any "Nationally Significant Infrastructure Project" (NSIP), and once given, allowed compulsory purchase of land.) for the AMEP plan were begun. Associated British Ports (ABP) submitted two petitions: an objection and an alternative petition for amendment, both based on objections to compulsory purchase of land it had recently announced the intention to develop for a hydrocarbon importation facility, the Immingham Western Deepwater Jetty (IWDJ). ABP was subsequently accused of filing wrecking amendments at the initial hearings. ABP sought a modification of the plans, shortening the AMEP quay by 515 metres (1,690 ft). At hearings in April 2014 ABP's petitions of objections were found to be valid, requiring the development case to be heard by a committee of MPs. By July 2014 other issues with the plan had been withdrawn, with the ABP petitions to be heard at an inquiry in October. In August 2014 work began on a £60 million environmental remediation scheme for AMEP to create an alternative wading bird habitats on the banks of the Humber, enabling works began for the AMEP development in the same month, with £15 million funding coming from a government grant. In October 2014 the parliamentary committee rejected ABP's petitions, and in February 2015 ABP ended its legal opposition to the plans following rejection of a judicial review of the planning decision.

In mid-2015 DONG Energy agreed to a MOU with Able over the construction of an offshore wind operations base at the planned Able Marine Energy Park; however, in mid-2016 DONG withdrew from plans to use the site as an operations hub, following an internal review that concluded the site would not be in operation in time for its UK east coast wind farm plans.
