= Gordon Hamilton (scientist) =

Gordon Hamilton (c. 1966 – 22 October 2016) was a Scottish climate scientist who studied glaciers. He died on a trip to Antarctica in 2016 when his snowmobile fell into a crevasse. He was 50 at the time of his death.

== Career ==
Native to Scotland, Hamilton received a doctorate from the University of Cambridge in geophysics. He was a professor of the University of Maine. He studied ice sheet mass balance as well as the role of ice sheets in modulating global sea levels.

A 2010 article in The New York Times documented the danger involved in Hamilton's field work, noting that climate scientists including Hamilton and others were willing to take risks in order to retrieve temperature data that is essential to their work.

== Hamilton Glacier ==
The Hamilton Glacier on the Antarctic Edward VII Peninsula was named after him in 2003.
