= Colbeck Basin =

Colbeck Basin (77°0′S 159°30′W) is a deep undersea basin of the central Ross Ice Shelf named in association with Cape Colbeck. The name was approved by the Advisory Committee for Undersea Features in June 1988.
