= Scott Island =

Island in Antarctica

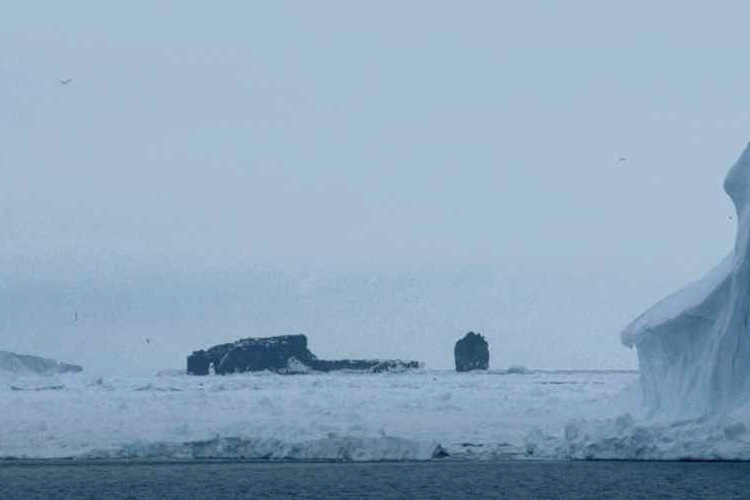
- Scott Island and Haggitt Pillar

- Location within Antarctica

Geography
- Location: Antarctica
- Coordinates: 67°22.7′S 179°54.7′W
- Area: 4 ha (9.9 acres)
- Length: 0.565 km (0.3511 mi)
- Highest elevation: 54 m (177 ft)

Administration
- Antarctica
- Administered under the Antarctic Treaty System

Demographics
- Population: Uninhabited

Scott Island is a small uninhabited island of volcanic origin in the Ross Sea, Southern Ocean, 505 kilometres (310 mi) northeast of Cape Adare, the northeastern extremity of Victoria Land, Antarctica. It is 565 metres (618 yd) long north–south, and between 130 metres (140 yd) and 340 metres (370 yd) wide, reaching a height of 54 metres (177 ft) and covering an area of 4 hectares (9.9 acres). Haggitt Pillar, a stack reaching 62 metres (203 ft) in height and measuring 50 metres (55 yd) in diameter, yielding an area of less than 0.2 hectares (0.5 acres), is located 250 metres (270 yd) west of the island. The island has two small coves with beaches, the rest of the island being surrounded by high cliffs. One of the coves is on the northeastern coast and the other opposite Haggitt Pillar on the western coast of the island.

The island was discovered and landed upon on 25 December 1902 by captain William Colbeck, commander of the SY Morning, the relief ship for Robert Scott's expedition. Colbeck originally planned to name the island Markham Island, after Sir Clements Markham, but later decided to name it after Scott. Haggitt Pillar is named after Colbeck's mother's family name (or possibly his brother's Christian name). In 2006, a mapping expedition to the Ross Sea found the islands 2.3 kilometres (1.4 mi) north of their previously determined position.

Scott Island is part of the Ross Dependency, claimed by New Zealand (see Territorial claims of Antarctica).

There was an automatic weather station on the island from December 1987 to March 1999. The records show an average temperature of a few °C (°F) below 0 °C (32 °F) in summer, and down to −40 °C (−40 °F) in winter.

On 12 February 2009 Andrew Perry and Molly Kendall, crew members of the Sea Shepherd Conservation Society's ship MY Steve Irwin, were married on the island by captain Paul Watson.

== See also ==
- Composite Antarctic Gazetteer
- SCAR
- Territorial claims in Antarctica
- List of Antarctic islands south of 60° S
- List of islands
- Desert island
