= USS Caloosahatchee =

Oiler of the United States Navy

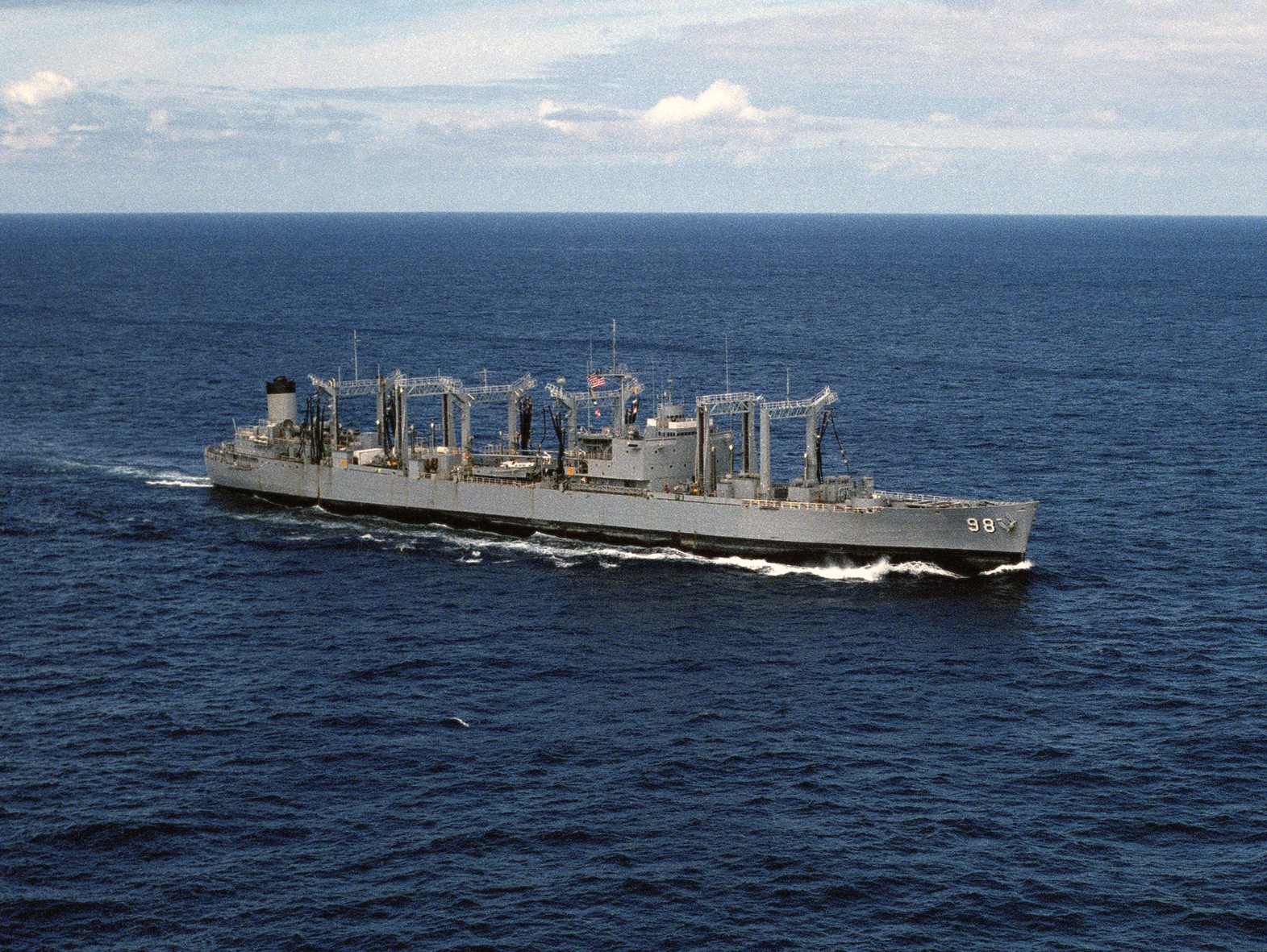
- Caloosahatchee in 1988

History

United States
- Name: USS Caloosahatchee
- Namesake: The Caloosahatchee River in southwest Florida
- Ordered: as T3-S2-A3 tanker hull; MC hull 2560
- Laid down: 30 November 1944
- Launched: 2 June 1945
- Commissioned: 10 October 1945
- Decommissioned: 28 February 1990
- Stricken: 18 July 1994
- Home port: Newport, Rhode Island and Norfolk, Virginia
- Identification: IMO number: 8628315
- Fate: Transferred to the Maritime Administration, 18 December 1998. Sold for scrap to Able UK and towed to Hartlepool UK, 2003. Scrapping complete, April 2010.

General characteristics
- Class & type: Cimarron-class oiler
- Type: Oiler
- Displacement: 7,470 t.(lt) 25,450 t.(fl) as built 16,500 t. (lt) 36,500 t.(fl) Jumboized
- Length: 553 ft (169 m) as built 664 ft (202 m) Jumboized
- Beam: 75 ft (23 m)
- Draught: 32 ft (9.8 m)
- Propulsion: steam turbines, four boilers, two shafts, 13,500 shp (10,100 kW) , twin screws, 30,400 hp (22,700 kW).
- Speed: 18 knots
- Capacity: Liquid 8,000,000 gallons, Ordnance cargo cap. 400 tons, Provision cargo cap. 525 tons (Support for 3,000 men for 30 days)
- Complement: 22 officers, 335 enlisted
- Crew: 12 officers, ~300 enlisted
- Armament: one single 5 in (130 mm)/38 dual-purpose gun mount; four single 3 in (76 mm)/50 dual-purpose gun mounts; four twin 40 mm AA gun mounts; four twin 20 mm AA gun mounts

USS Caloosahatchee (AO-98) was a Cimarron-class fleet oiler constructed for the United States Navy for use in World War II but commissioned too late for service in that conflict. However, she had a lengthy career during the Cold War that followed. She was the only U.S. Navy ship to bear the name Caloosahatchee, after the Caloosahatchee River in southwest Florida.

Caloosahatchee (AO-98) was launched 2 June 1945 by Bethlehem Steel-Sparrows Point Shipyard, Inc., Sparrows Point, Maryland, under a United States Maritime Commission contract; sponsored by Mrs. C. L. Andrews; acquired by the Navy 10 October 1945; commissioned the same day and reported to Commander, Service Force, Atlantic Fleet.

== Cold War operations ==
Caloosahatchee cruised off the East Coast of the United States, transporting oil and fueling ships at sea, and made a voyage to Iceland from Norfolk, Virginia, during her first two years of operations. On 14 August 1947, she sailed for her first tour of duty with the United States Sixth Fleet in the Mediterranean, a deployment that marked almost every year of her operations from that time into 1960.

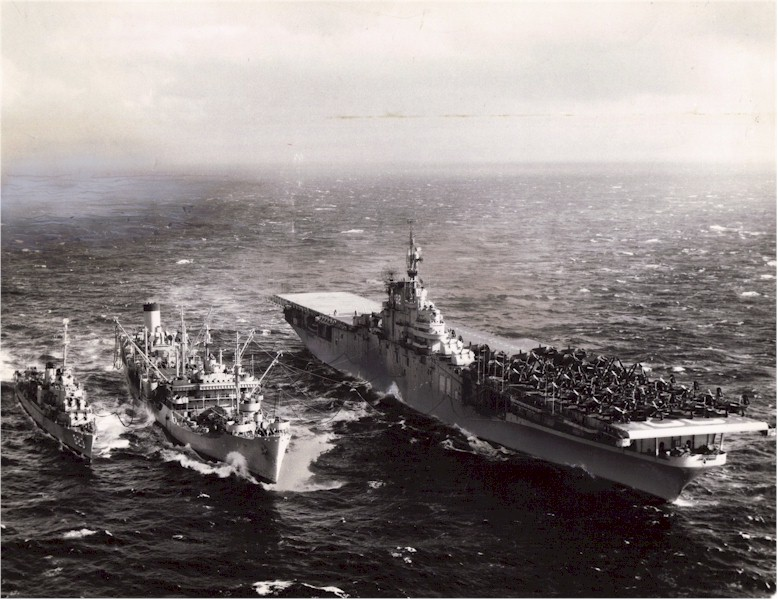
Caloosahatchee fueling Leyte and Samuel B. Roberts in 1948.

During this period, Caloosahatchee conducted at-sea replenishment operations that supported the mobility, flexibility and efficiency of the United States Sixth Fleet.

Among other widespread operations, Caloosahatchee participated in NATO Operation Mariner off Greenock, Scotland, from 16 September to 20 October 1953, and provided summer training for future naval officers in midshipman cruises to Le Havre, France, in 1954, and to Copenhagen, Denmark, in 1956. In fall 1957 and again in summer 1958, the oiler sailed with forces calling at ports in England, Scotland, France, and Portugal.

Caloosahatchee's constant readiness for emergency deployments or other challenges to her operational capability was developed and maintained through training operations along the east coast, and participation in such large-scale Atlantic Fleet exercises as Operation Springboard held in the Caribbean, which operations continued through 1960.

Between 1966 and 1968 Caloosahatchee, along with her sister ships Ashtabula and Canisteo, underwent "jumboization". A 27 m (400-foot) midsection, built entirely new from the keel up, was inserted and welded between her original bow and stern. This replaced the old 310-foot midsection and increased the vessel's liquid cargo capacity by over one-third. Her new configuration closely resembled that of a more modern type of ship, the replenishment oiler. Caloosahatchee was recommissioned on 27 September 1969 and assigned to Service Squadron 2 (SERVRON 2), homeported in Newport, Rhode Island (USA).

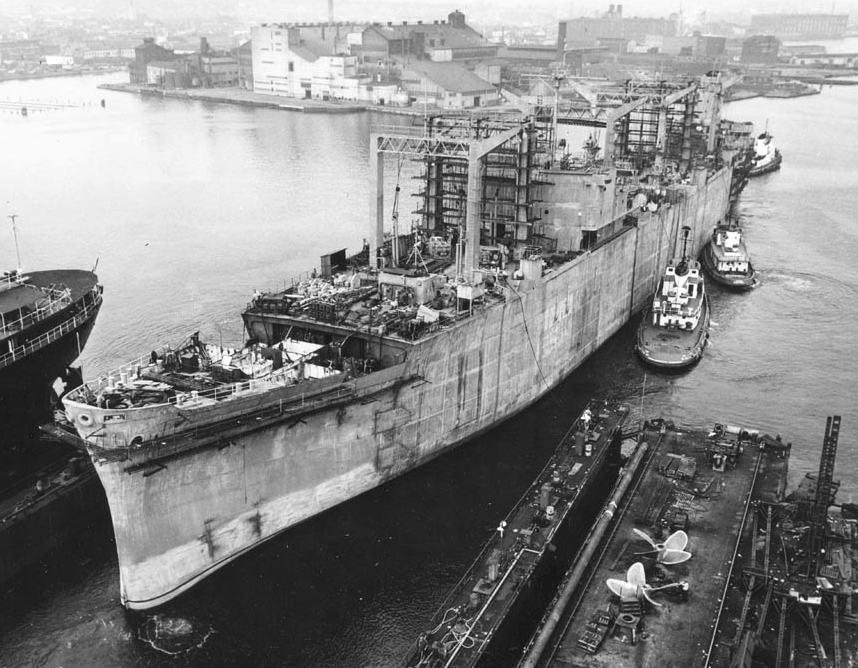
Caloosahatchee being undocked after her lengthening, 1968.

During September 1970, Caloosahatchee participated in the naval blockade off the coast of Lebanon during the Black September in Jordan. The conflict was fought between the two major components of the Jordanian population, the Palestinians represented by the Palestine Liberation Organisation (PLO) under the leadership of Yasser Arafat and the native Jordanians represented by the Jordanian Armed Forces under the leadership of Hussein of Jordan.

In 1974 Caloosahatchee was transferred to the Bethlehem shipyard for a seven-month overhaul. While approaching dock facilities, the ship struck a dockside chock and bent the starboard shaft. The ship spent seven months effecting repairs to the starboard shaft. In addition, twin screws were transported by truck to replace the existing worn out screws.

By February 1975, Caloosahatchee changed homeport to Norfolk, Virginia, and was transferred to Service Squadron 4. She deployed to the Mediterranean Sea via the North Atlantic, North Sea, and Baltic Sea. On the way Caloosahatchee was temporarily assigned to 2nd Fleet for operations off the coast of Norway, eventually transiting the Arctic Circle. During the Mediterranean cruise, Caloosahatchee visited, Palma, Majorca, Rota, Spain, Brest, France, Liverpool, Loch Striven and Loch Ewe, United Kingdom and eventually Naples, Italy for approximately one and one half months.

While in the Mediterranean in 1975, Caloosahatchee was involved in a collision with USS Inchon to port and USS Hermitage to starboard. The ship suffered a gash to the port side along with the loss of the port anchor. A shoring party effected repairs. Caloosahatchee proceeded to Genoa, Italy, to effect repairs to ensure seaworthiness. Due to Navy stand down orders, Caloosahatchee proceeded to Naples, Italy, to finish repairs. The ship spent approximately one and one half months in Naples for repairs.

In 1977, Caloosahatchee collided after a refueling with USS Rich (DD-820) off Puerto Rico due to a steering casualty onboard Rich. Rich was eventually determined to be damaged beyond economical repair and scrapped.

Later in 1977 Caloosahatchee again deployed to the Mediterranean Sea, visiting Marseille, France, and Palermo, Sicily.

In 1978, Caloosahatchee underwent an eight-month major extended regular overhaul in Brooklyn, New York City. Following overhaul and after refresher training in August 1979, Caloosahatchee departed a month later with Commander United States Second Fleet for Northern Europe and NATO exercises to be conducted in the North Atlantic, North Sea, and the Baltic Sea where the oiler replenished 116 ships. In 1980, Caloosahatchee participated in various exercises, which involved two deployments to Guantanamo Bay, Cuba and a five-month deployment to the Mediterranean Sea. Over 170 replenishments were completed in 1980, a new record for the ship. In the following year, the oiler deployed to the Caribbean and for six months to the Mediterranean Sea.

During 1988, Caloosahatchee made her last deployment to the Mediterranean Sea, where she recorded 191 underway replenishments. In 1989, she participated in exercise UNITAS XXX and crossed the equator.

== Decommissioning and disposal ==
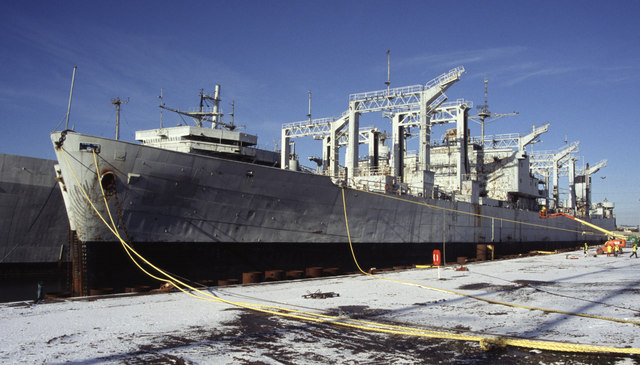
Caloosahatchee at Hartlepool, in 2004.

Caloosahatchee was decommissioned on 28 February 1990, and was struck from the Naval Vessel Register on 18 July 1994. She was transferred to the Maritime Administration on 18 December 1998 for lay up in the National Defense Reserve Fleet, James River, Fort Eustis, Virginia. Caloosahatchee was sold for scrapping to Able UK, Hartlepool, Teesside, UK, and removed from the Reserve Fleet under tow, arriving in the United Kingdom on 12 November 2003.

Caloosahatchee and three other decommissioned Navy ships, Canisteo, Canopus and Compass Island all arrived at Able UK under the same contract and came to be known as the "Hartlepool Four". Local protests and legal challenges, alleging unacceptable amounts of toxic substances contained on and in the vessels, delayed scrapping until Able UK secured the appropriate waste management licensing in August 2008. Scrapping of Caloosahatchee commenced in November 2009 and was complete by April 2010.

== Military awards and honors ==
Caloosahatchee's crew were authorized the following medals:

- SecNav Letter of Commendation (1)
- Navy Unit Commendation
- American Campaign Medal
- World War II Victory Medal
- National Defense Service Medal with star (2 awards)
- Armed Forces Expeditionary Medal with 2 stars (1-Cuba, 1-Dominican Republic, 1-Grenada)
