= Toby Colbeck =

English cricketer

Leonard George ("Toby") Colbeck (1 January 1884 – 3 January 1918) was an English first-class cricketer active from 1905 to 1914, playing for Middlesex. He was born in South Harrow. He died off the Cape of Good Hope in HMS Ormonde during World War I, in which he had been awarded the Military Cross.
