= USS Inchon =

Former amphibious assault ship of the United States Navy

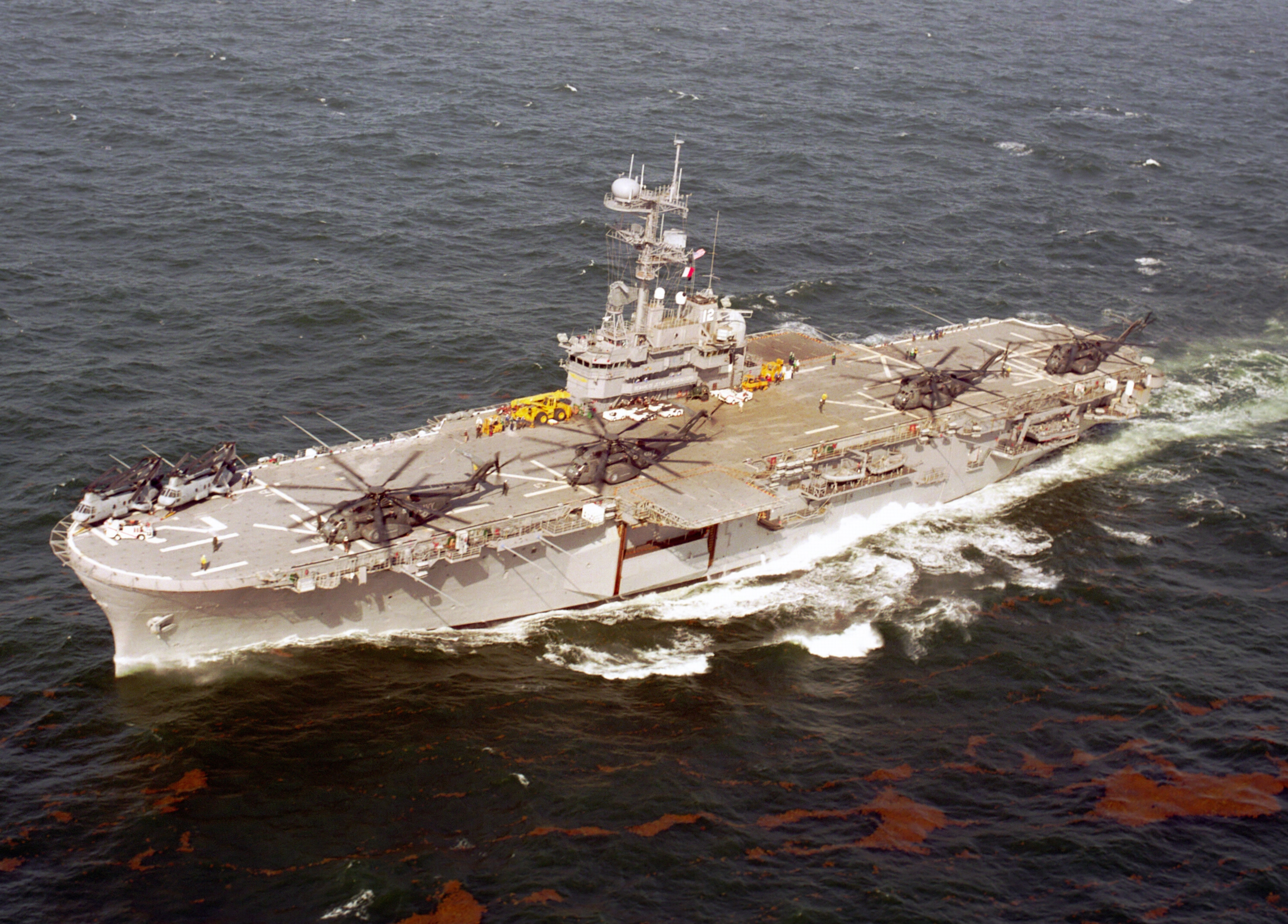
- USS Inchon in the Gulf of Mexico, 2001

History

United States
- Name: Inchon
- Namesake: Battle of Inchon
- Ordered: 16 June 1966
- Builder: Ingalls Shipbuilding
- Laid down: 8 April 1968
- Launched: 24 May 1969
- Commissioned: 20 June 1970
- Decommissioned: 20 June 2002
- Reclassified: MCS-12
- Stricken: 24 May 2004
- Identification: Callsign: NOUD; Hull number: LPH-12
- Motto: Never More Brightly
- Fate: Sunk as target, 5 December 2004

General characteristics
- Class & type: Iwo Jima-class amphibious assault ship
- Displacement: 19,500 tons
- Length: 603.65 ft (183.99 m)
- Beam: 104 ft (32 m)
- Draft: 25.9 ft (7.9 m)
- Installed power: 2 × 600 psi (4.1 MPa) boilers; 22,000 shp (16,000 kW)
- Propulsion: One geared steam turbine, one shaft,
- Speed: 21 knots (39 km/h; 24 mph)
- Complement: 1,443 (122 officer, 1,321 enlisted)
- Armament: Initially: 2 × 2 3-inch (76 mm) / 50 caliber DP guns, 8 cell Sea Sparrow BPDMS launchers, Later: 2 × Phalanx CIWS; 4 × .50 cal (12.7 mm) lightweight guns; Stinger missiles
- Aircraft carried: (MCS-12 configuration) 8 × Sikorsky MH-53E Sea Dragon, 2 × UH-46D Sea Knight

USS Inchon (LPH/MCS-12) was an Iwo Jima-class amphibious assault ship of the United States Navy in service from 1970 to 2002. Following a major fire, she was laid up and sunk as a target in 2004.

Like other Iwo Jima-class ships, she was named after a major battle involving the US Marine Corps, specifically the Battle of Inchon.

== History ==
Inchon was laid down on 8 April 1968 by Ingalls Shipbuilding, in Pascagoula, Mississippi, US with the hull classification number LPH-12. She was named for the Battle of Inchon, a turning point of the Korean War. The ship was launched on 24 May 1969 and commissioned on 20 June 1970.

=== Service history ===
==== Vietnam War ====
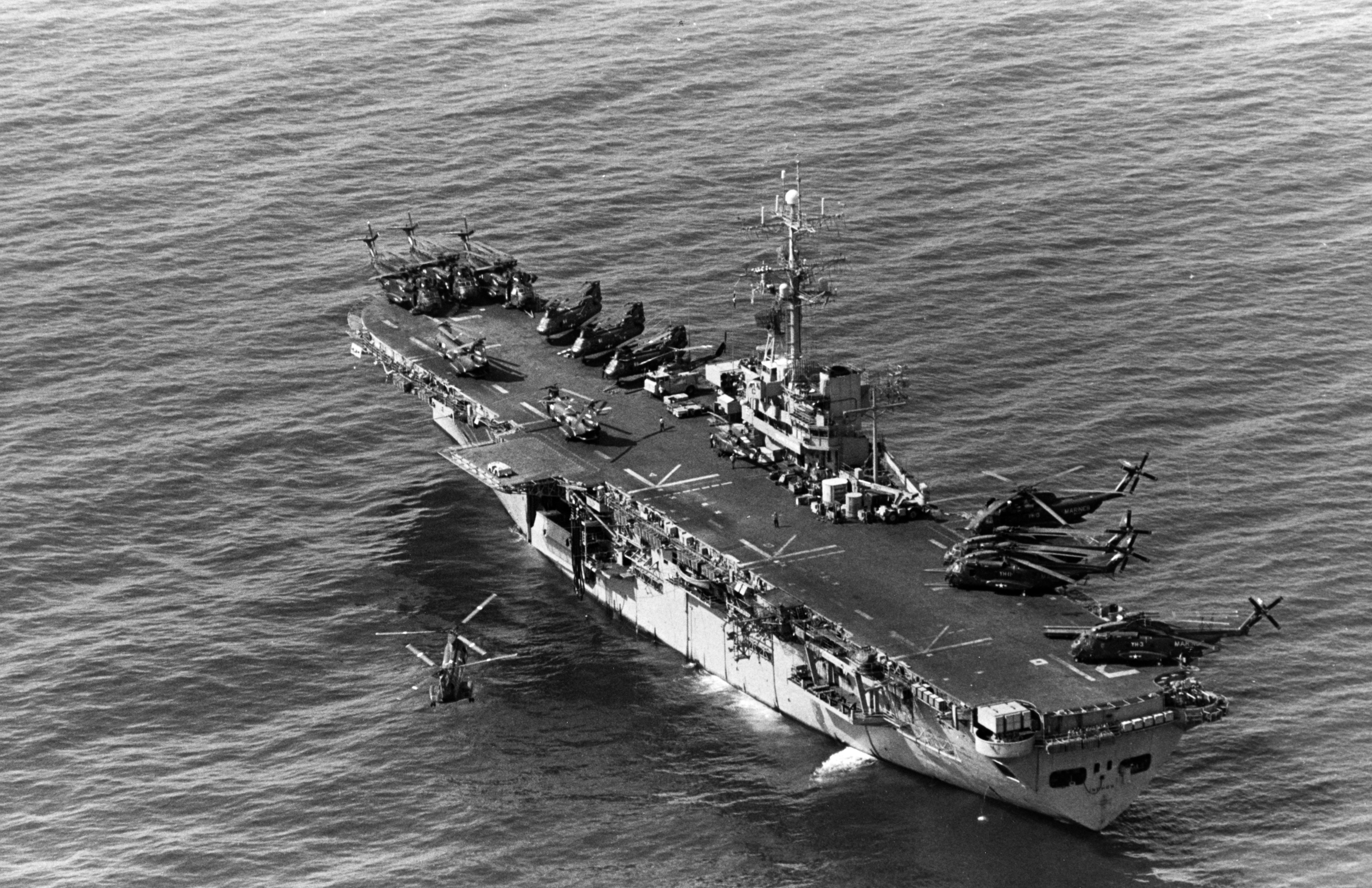
Inchon off North Vietnam in 1973.

In 1972–1973, Inchon circumnavigated the globe and returned to Naval Station Norfolk, Virginia. In February 1973, Inchon was attached to Task Force 78 for Operation End Sweep, the U.S. Navy's effort to clear U.S. mines from North Vietnamese waters after the signing of the Paris Peace Accords. Those operations were suspended from 17 April through 17 June. They resumed 18 June and End Sweep was completed on 18 July.

On 9 July 1975, more than 100 sailors and marines from Inchon and amphibious transport dock USS Shreveport fought a fire on board a Spanish merchant vessel at Palma de Mallorca, Spain. On 16 December, Inchon and oiler USS Caloosahatchee were in a minor collision during refueling in rough seas west of Italy.

On 5 February 1980, while involved in an underway refueling with USS Spiegel Grove in the Atlantic, the two vessels collided, with Inchon's helicopter elevator ripping through a Marine berthing space on Spiegel Grove and destroying one of that ship's 50-ton cranes. There were no injuries, however.

On 29 September 1981 LCDR Kenneth Wessel, Inchon's Aircraft Handling Officer, was killed when the UH-1 Huey he was flying crashed off the coast of Virginia Beach. Three other crew members on the helicopter were rescued.

On 7 October 1981, Inchon suffered a boiler explosion while preparing to get underway from Naval Station Norfolk.

==== Multinational Force – Beirut, Lebanon ====
From 29 October 1982 to 15 February 1983 Inchon earned the Navy Unit Commendation and the Navy Expeditionary Medal serving as the flagship of Amphibious Squadron 6, on station at Beirut, Lebanon. The Citation for the Navy Unit Commendation reads:

For exceptionally meritorious service from 29 October 1982 to 15 February 1983 in a mission of great national and international importance while serving as the United States Forces Ashore Lebanon and supporting forces of the Multinational Force peace initiatives in Lebanon. on 29 October 1982, Mediterranean Amphibious Ready Group 3-82 and Marine Amphibious Unit 24 conducted a combined surface and helo landing across Black Beach and the International Airport of Beirut, Lebanon and immediately commenced coordinated motorized and foot patrols with other Multinational Force contingents throughout the City of Beirut. Simultaneously with operations ashore, Amphibious Task Force helicopters provided special support to the U.S. Ambassador to Lebanon and special Presidential envoys, and provided major logistics lifts from Air Support Head at Larnaca, Cyprus, to Beirut. Their superior performance and tireless devotion contributed significantly to the national objectives of world peace and Middle East stability. By their resolute determination, unrelenting perseverance, and steadfast dedication to duty, the officers and enlisted personnel of Mediterranean Amphibious Ready Group 3-82 and Marine Amphibious Unit 24 reflected great credit upon themselves and upheld the highest traditions of the Marine Corps and the United States Naval Service.

On 13 August 1986, Inchon suffered a casualty to the ship's evaporators while underway to Morehead City, North Carolina, causing the ship to return to Norfolk for two days of repairs. In November 1989 a fire in the hangar deck of Inchon injured 31 people while the ship was docked for maintenance in Norfolk.

Inchon played a key role in Operation Sharp Edge in 1990, performing evacuation operations during Liberia's civil war. Shortly afterwards, Inchon patrolled the southern Mediterranean in preparation for emergency evacuations in support of Operation Desert Shield and Operation Desert Storm.

In 1994, Inchon deployed to the Mediterranean Sea and Indian Ocean to conduct Operation Continue Hope off the coast of Somalia and Operation Deny Flight off the coast of Bosnia. Following a six-month deployment, Inchon remained in home port for only two weeks, before she was called upon to assist in Operation Uphold Democracy off the coast of Haiti.

==== Mine countermeasures ship ====
On 1 March 1995, Inchon was re-classed as a mine countermeasures ship MCS-12 and commenced a 15-month conversion/overhaul by Ingalls Shipbuilding. In July 1996, Inchon changed homeports to Ingleside, Texas, home of the U.S. Navy's Mine Warfare Center of Excellence. Sustaining extended mine countermeasures operations at forward deployed locations required extensive command and control and logistics capabilities. Inchon provided both a landing platform for Sikorsky MH-53E Sea Dragon mine-sweeping helicopters and repair and re-supply facility for Avenger-class mine countermeasures ships and Osprey-class coastal minehunters. Inchon was assigned to the Active Naval Reserve Force, 30 September 1996. From March to July 1997, Inchon made her first deployment in her new capacity. Inchon once again deployed in 1999, from April through August, and the crew provided critical heavy lift support to Operation Shining Hope, the humanitarian relief effort for Kosovar refugees in the Balkans.

Inchon's final deployment began in April 2001. On 19 October 2001, Inchon suffered an oil fire in the main boiler room while conducting inport steaming for engineering trials and assessments. A fuel oil leak had sprung from a faulty gasket on one of the main fuel pumps. This resulted in fuel oil leaking into the bilge. At some unknown point the bilge caught fire. The actual cause of the ignition to the fuel oil remains unknown. The entire bilge caught fire, and the space immediately filled with smoke. Of the nine enlisted men operating in the space, eight made it out. Petty Officer Third Class Ronnie Joe Palm Jr. of Houston, succumbed to smoke inhalation just after helping one of his fellow sailors escape. He was posthumously awarded for his heroism with the highest peacetime honor the Navy could bestow, the Navy and Marine Corps Medal.

==== Decommissioning and fate ====
Since severe damage occurred to her boiler plant the Navy made the decision at that time to decommission rather than repair the ship. Inchon was decommissioned, 20 June 2002, at NS Ingleside, Texas.

Inchon was towed by USNS Mohawk from Ingleside to Philadelphia, Pennsylvania where she was laid up in the Atlantic Reserve Fleet. She was stricken from the Naval Vessel Register 24 May 2004 and sunk on 5 December 2004 at 36°42′30″N 71°40′0″W, in 2,150 fathoms (3.9 km) of water, 207 nautical miles (383 km) east of Virginia Beach, Virginia.

== List of awards, citations and campaign ribbons ==
- Navy Unit Commendation with 2 awards
- Navy Meritorious Unit Commendation with 3 awards
- Navy E Ribbon with 5 awards
- Marjorie Sterrett Battleship Fund Award
- Navy Expeditionary Medal with 3 awards
- National Defense Service Medal with 2 awards
- Armed Forces Expeditionary Medal
- Vietnam Service Medal
- Republic of Vietnam Campaign Medal
- Navy Battle "E" with 5 awards
- Sea Service Overseas Ribbon with 3 awards

== Gallery ==
USS Inchon Lifecycle

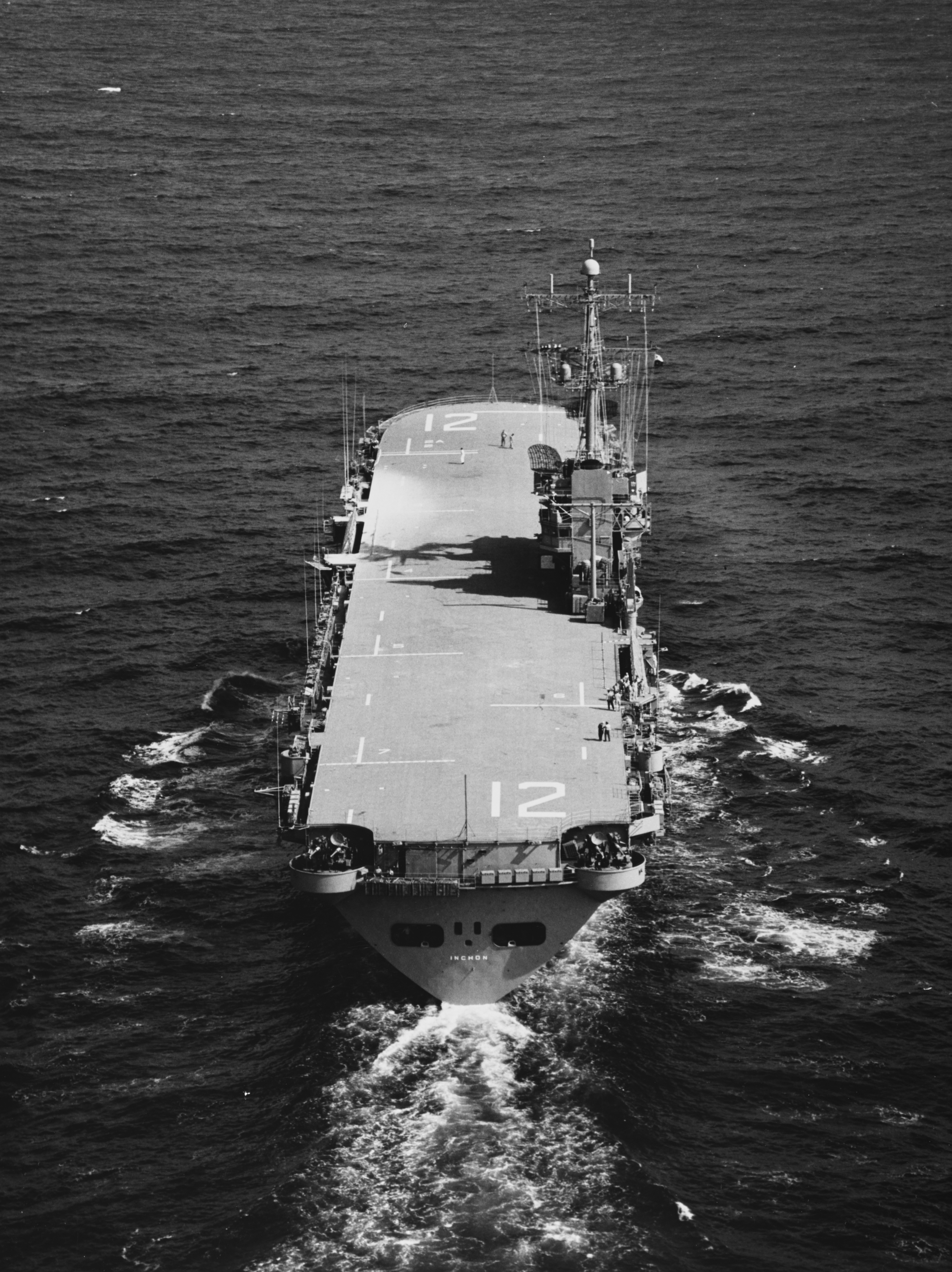
USS Inchon underway in the Gulf of Mexico in May 1970.

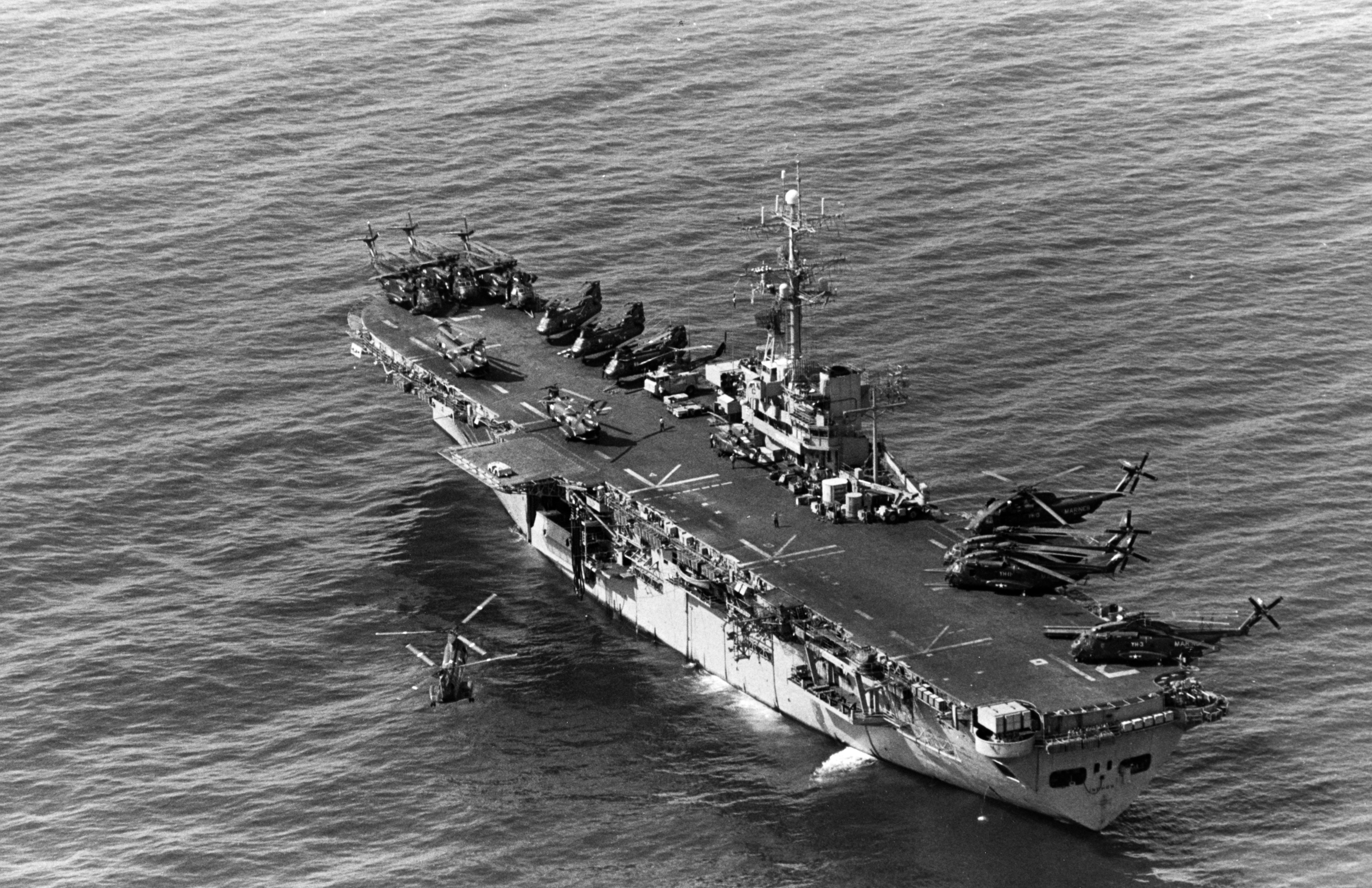
USS Inchon off Haiphong in 1973.

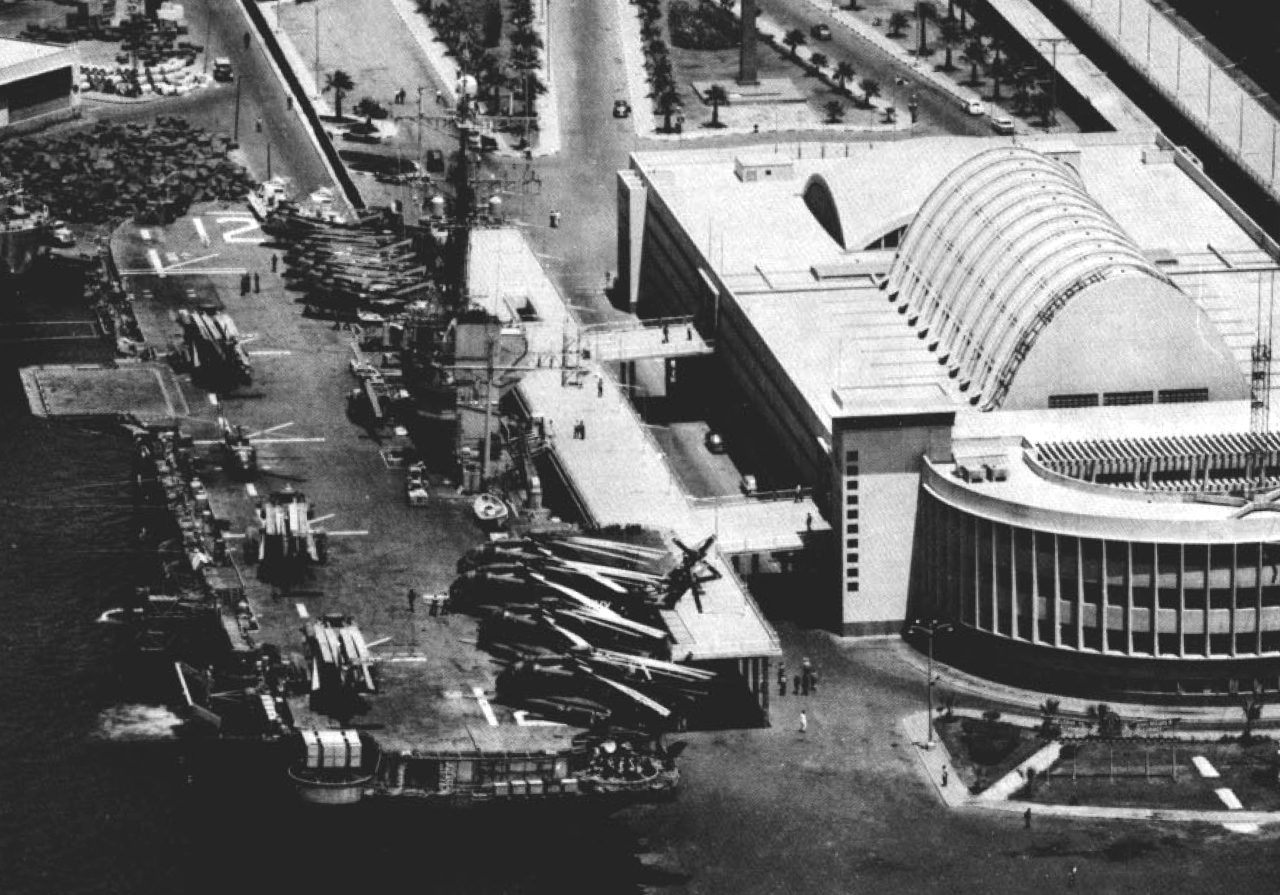
USS Inchon at Alexandria, Egypt in 1974

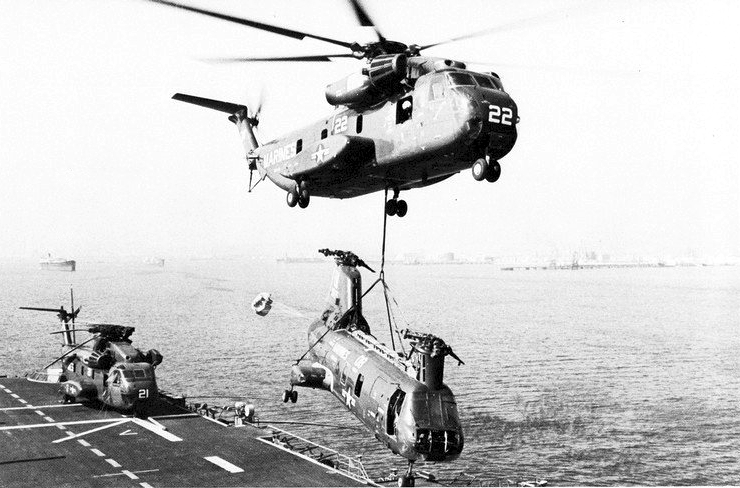
CH-53 lifts a CH-46 from USS Inchon in 1977.

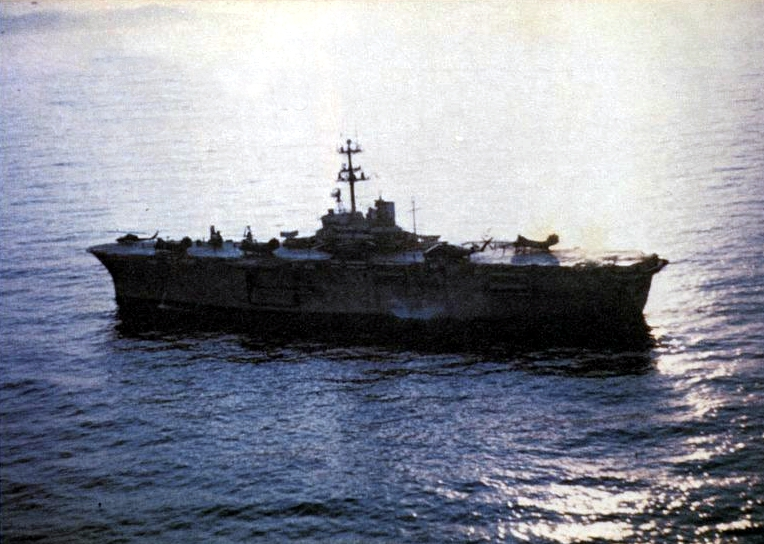
USS Inchon underway in the Mediterranean Sea in 1979.

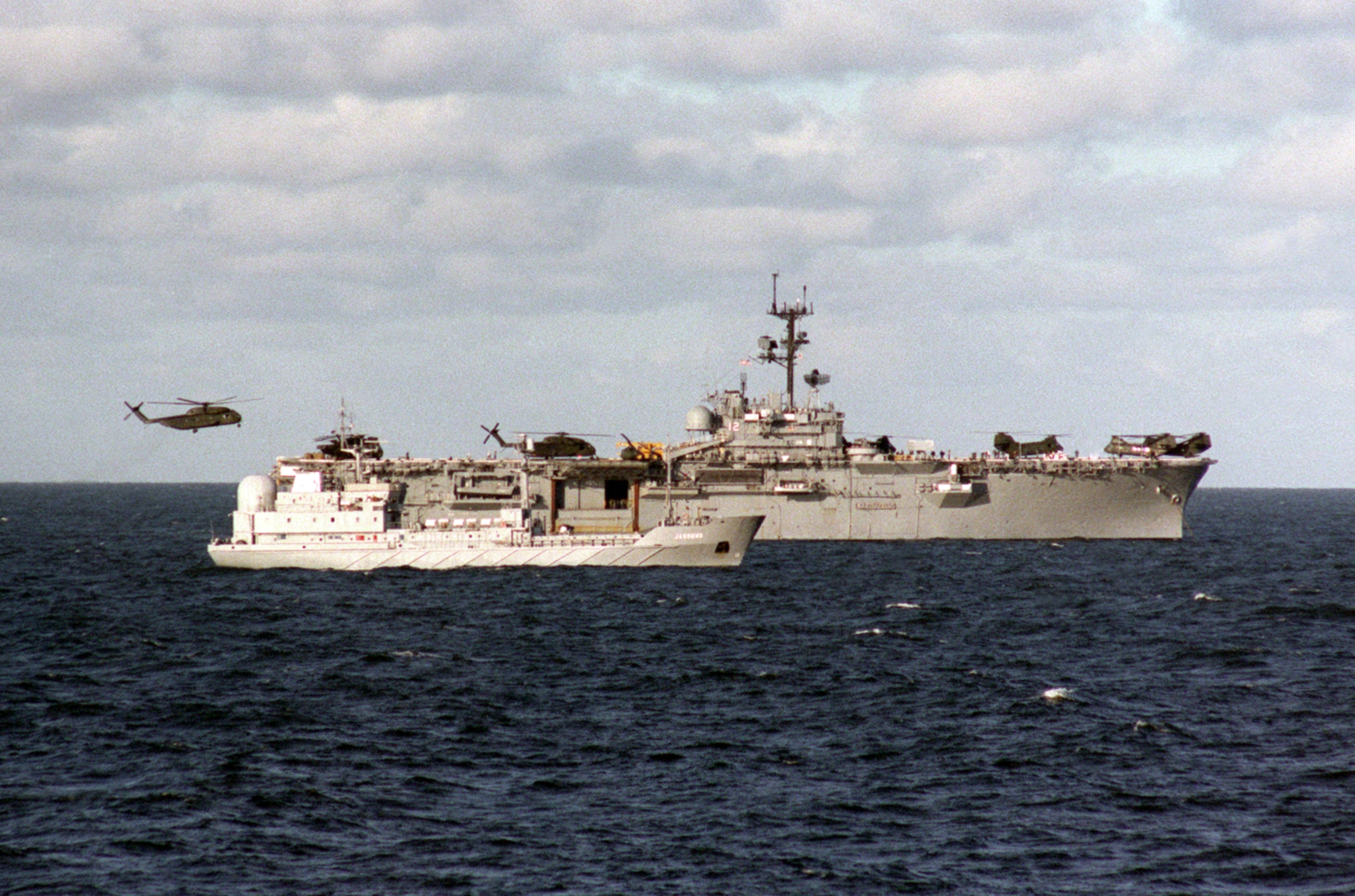
USS Inchon with DDR Jasmund (D-41) in 1986,

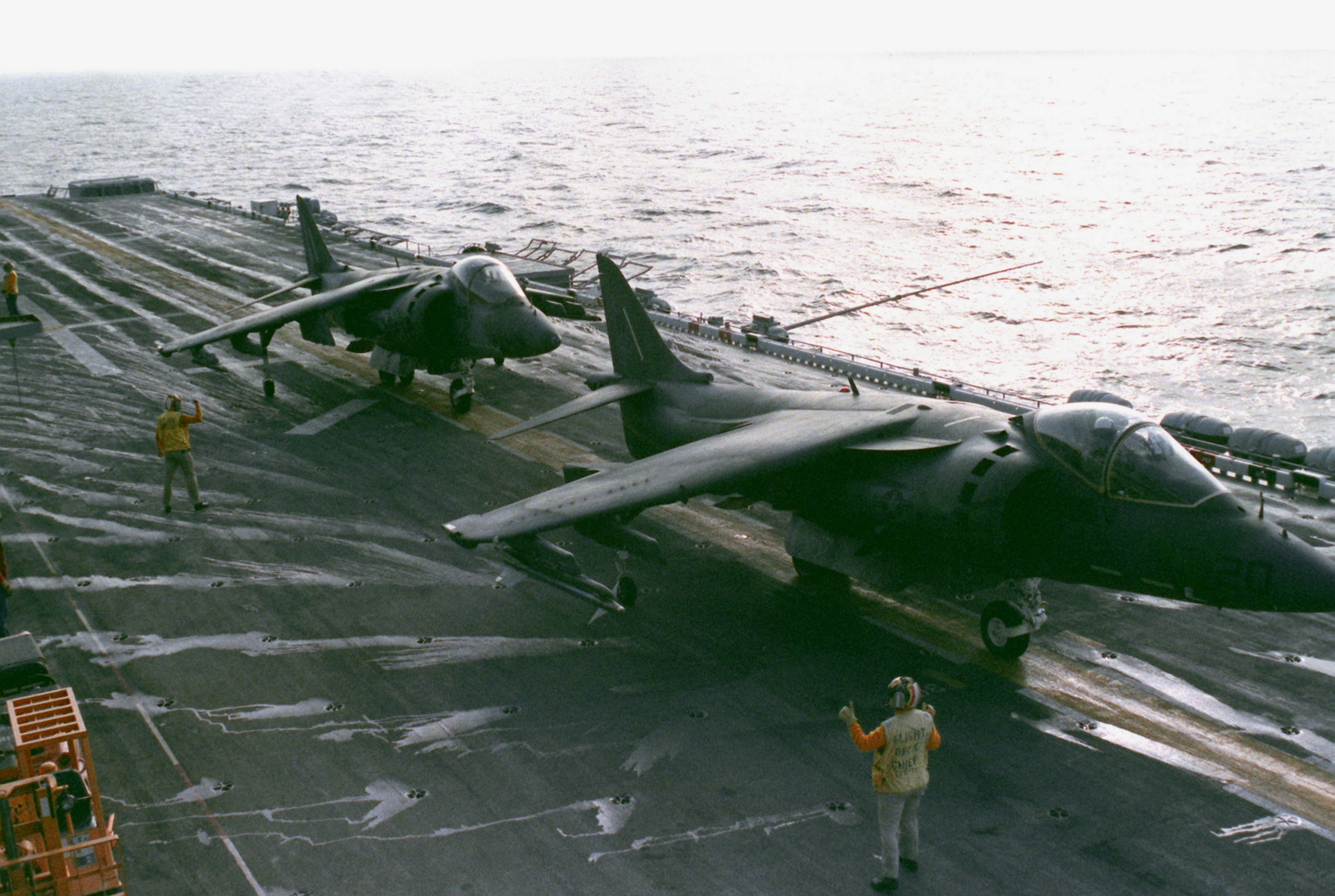
AV-8B Harriers on USS Inchon in 1989.

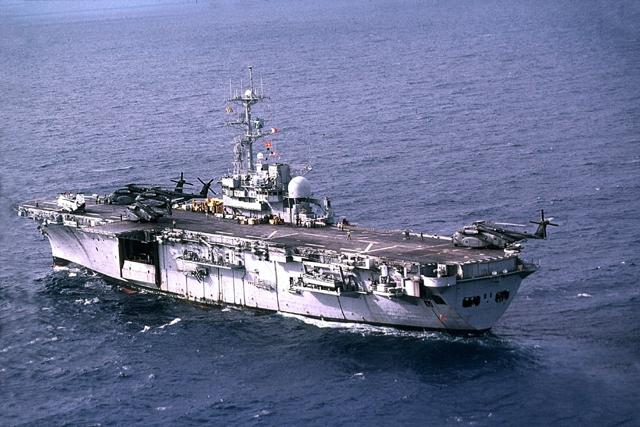
USS Inchon underway at sea in September 1997.

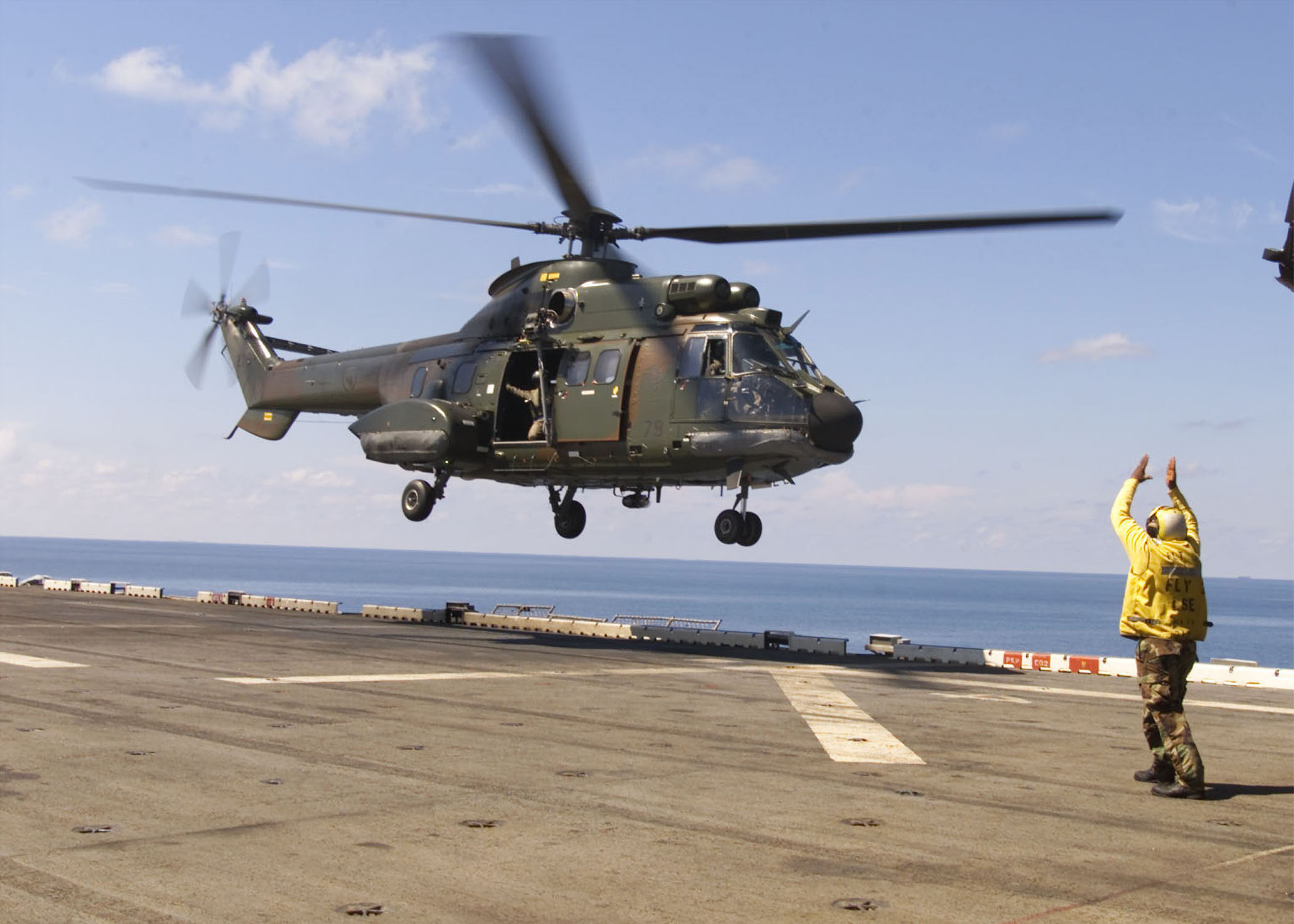
Singapore Super Puma lands on USS Inchon in 2001.

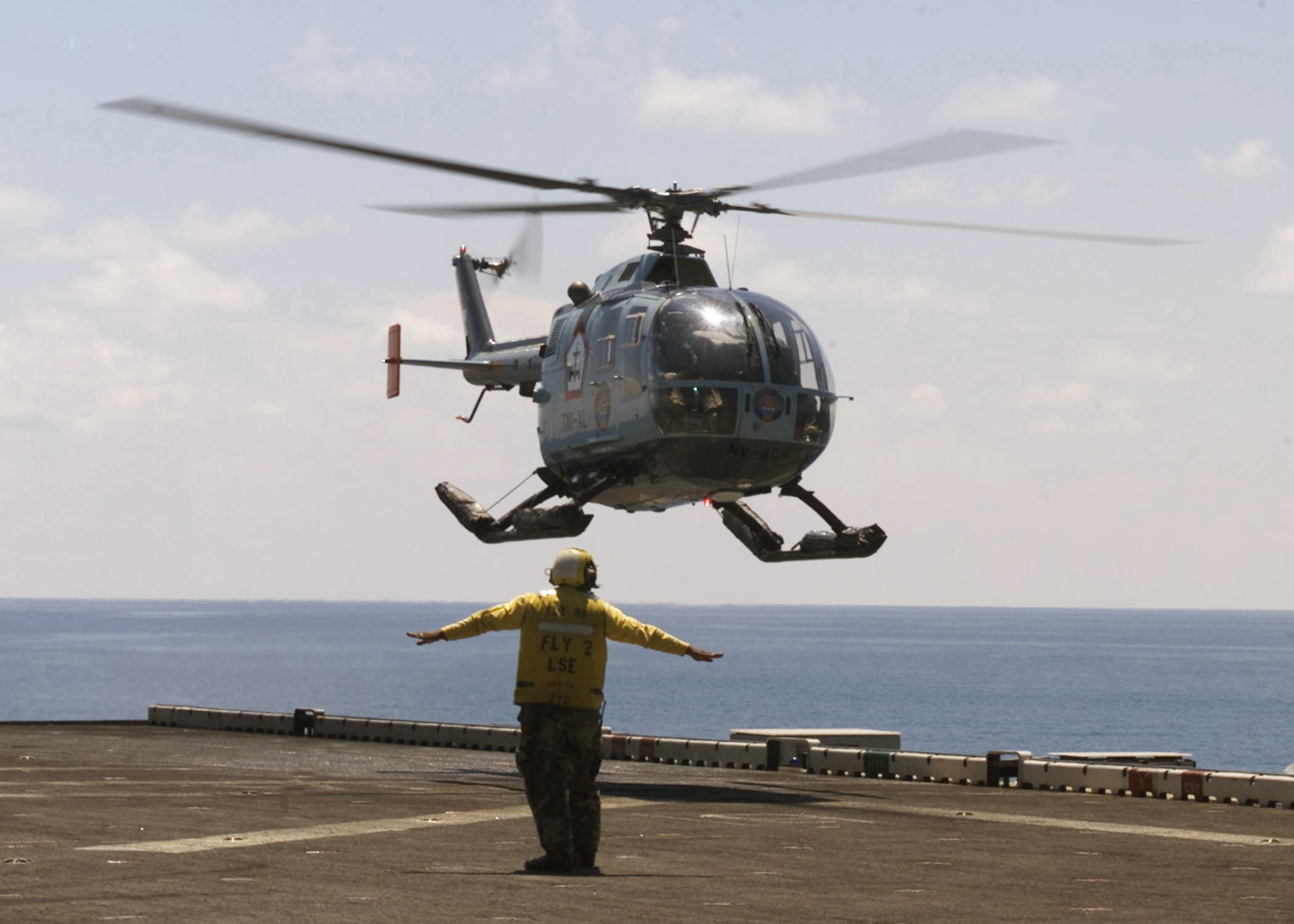
Indonesian Navy Bo. 105 lands on USS Inchon in 2001.
