= Cape Colbeck =

Headland of Antarctica

Coordinates: 77°7′S 158°1′W

Location of Cape Colbeck in Antarctica

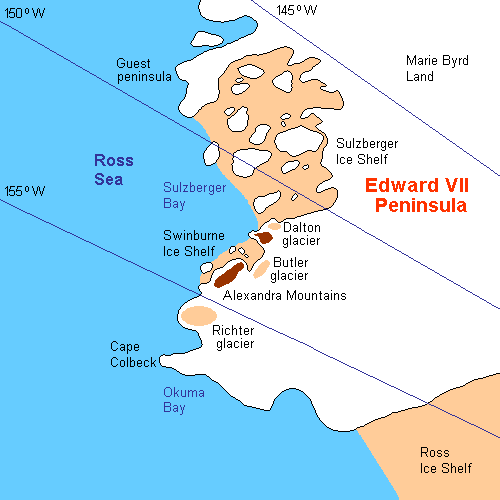
Area map of Cape Colbeck.

Cape Colbeck is a prominent ice-covered cape which forms the northwestern extremity of the Edward VII Peninsula and Marie Byrd Land in Antarctica. It was discovered in January 1902 by the British National Antarctic Expedition and named for Captain William Colbeck, Royal Naval Reserve, who commanded Robert Scott's relief ship, the Morning.

== Important Bird Area ==
A 351 ha site on fast ice near the eastern coast of the cape has been identified as an Important Bird Area (IBA) by BirdLife International because it supports a colony of about 11,000 emperor penguins (as estimated from 2009 satellite imagery).
