= SY Morning =

Steam yacht

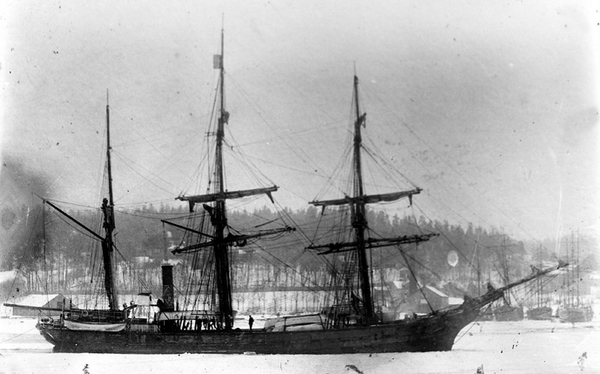
- Morgenen

History

United Kingdom
- Name: Morgenen; SY Morning
- Builder: Svend Foyn
- Fate: Foundered 24 December 1915

General characteristics
- Class & type: Barque-rigged steam yacht
- Tonnage: Gross tonnage 437; Registered tonnage 297
- Length: 140 ft (43 m)
- Beam: 31.5 ft (9.6 m)
- Draught: light draught 15.5 ft (4.7 m) after and 12 ft (3.7 m) forward, loaded 19 ft (5.8 m) after and 17 ft (5.2 m) forward

SY Morning was a steam yacht, known for her role as a relief vessel to Scott's British National Antarctic Expedition (1901–1904). She made two voyages to the Antarctic to resupply the expedition.

== Acquisition for the British National Antarctic Expedition ==
Morgenen was a Norwegian whaling ship, built in 1871 by Svend Foyn of Tønsberg, Norway. In 1901 she was purchased as a relief ship for the British National Antarctic Expedition for £3,880. In September 1901, she sailed from Norway to England where she was refitted and renamed Morning, the same name translated into English.

== Ships' company ==
The officers that set sail from London in 1902 were: Captain William Colbeck RNR; Rupert G. England, first officer; Lieutenant E.R.G.R. Evans RN, second officer; Gerald Doorly RNR, third officer; Sub-Lieutenant G.F.A. Mulock RN, fourth officer; Doctor G.A. Davidson; J.D. Morrison, chief engineer; and F. L. Maitland-Somerville and Neville Pepper, both midshipmen. The crew consisted of eight petty officers, nine seamen, and three firemen. During the voyages, the people filling these posts sometimes changed.

== London to New Zealand ==
Morning sailed from London to Lyttelton, New Zealand via Madeira. She left London on 2 July 1902 and arrived in Lyttelton on 16 November the same year.

== Voyage of the Morning ==
Although making two voyages to restock the expedition, it is the first that is known as the voyage of the Morning. She sailed from Lyttelton for the Antarctic, under the command of Captain William Colbeck, on 6 December 1902. On Christmas Day, the crew sighted two uncharted islands, now known as Scott Island and Haggitt's Pillar. A landing was made and the islands were claimed for the British Empire. Morning became stuck on a rock for 20 minutes here. The crew also collected scientific specimens as she voyaged south.

Morning called at several pre-arranged mail depositories in an attempt to locate Discovery, the expedition's main ship. At Cape Crozier, they found a message giving the location of her winter quarters. Discovery's masts were sighted just before midnight on 23 January 1903.

Supplies were sledged across the ice to the Discovery when it became apparent that the ice would not break up. Ernest Shackleton joined the crew of Morning as he was suffering from scurvy, and Mulock took his place on the Discovery. Several other seamen joined the Morning for the voyage back to New Zealand. She left McMurdo Sound on 2 March 1903 and arrived in New Zealand on 25 March.

A log of the voyage compiled by Leonard Burgess, a seaman, is held in the Macmillan Brown Library, University of Canterbury in New Zealand.

== Second voyage ==
Morning returned to the Antarctic a second time in the company of the Terra Nova later in 1903. They were sighted at Hut Point on 5 January 1904. The two ships were to evacuate the Discovery if she could not be freed from the ice. The ice broke, however, and all three ships returned together.

A log of the voyage, compiled by Leonard Burgess, a seaman, is also held in the Macmillan Brown Library, University of Canterbury.

== Cats ==
The Morning had several ship's cats.

- Bobs belonged to J.D. Morrison. It was lost overboard on the voyage between Madeira and New Zealand.
- Night, a black female.
- Noon, Night's white kitten.
- Morning, a grey tabby, lost overboard.

The Leonard Burgess log records "Nig" giving birth to 5 kittens at 11:30pm on 24 December 1903.

== The Songs of the Morning ==
Doorly dictated The Songs of the Morning, a compilation of songs written during the voyages. In most cases, the words were written by the chief engineer, John Donald Morrison, and were put to music by Doorly. It was published by the Melbourne Bread and Cheese Club in 1943. Two linking narratives are extant.

In 2002, a recording entitled The Songs of the Morning: a Musical Sketch was published. This is a mixture of songs, poems and narrative, mostly related to the voyage from London to Lyttelton and the first voyage to the Antarctic. Royalties from the recording are split between the Dundee Heritage Trust's Antarctica 100 Discovery Restoration Fund and the New Zealand Antarctic Heritage Trust.

== See also ==
- List of Antarctic exploration ships from the Heroic Age, 1897–1922
