= William Colbeck (sea captain) =

British seaman (1871–1930)

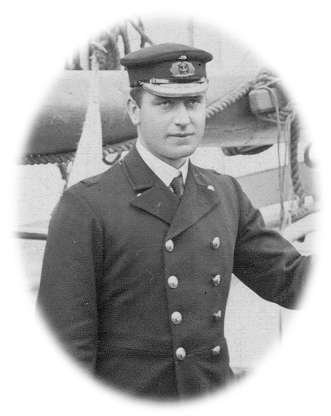
- Captain William Colbeck, captain of the Morning, pictured in 1902
- Born: William Colbeck; 8 August 1871; Kingston-upon-Hull, Yorkshire, UK
- Died: 19 October 1930 (aged 59); London, UK
- Resting place: Hither Green Cemetery
- Occupation: Sea captain
- Years active: 1900–1930
- Spouse: [Edith Robinson]
- Children: 4

William Colbeck (1871–1930) was a British seaman who distinguished himself on two Antarctic expeditions.

== Biography ==
William Colbeck was born on 8 August 1871, at Myton Place, Kingston-upon-Hull, Yorkshire. He was the fifth child in a family of ten born to Christopher Colbeck, a baker, and his wife Martha. Educated at Hull Grammar School, Colbeck served a merchant navy apprenticeship on the Loch Torridon between 1886 and 1890 and completed a six-month course in navigation before going to sea. He earned his second mate's certificate in Calcutta in 1890, first mate's certificate in July 1892, master's in March 1894. He joined the firm of Tomas Wilson, Sons and Co, Ltd., of Hull and served on RMS Montebello as the second mate under Captain Pepper. He passed as extra master in November 1897. He was awarded a Royal Navy reserve commission in 1898.

In that year he studied at Kew Observatory making a special feature of magnetism and it was in the capacity of Magnetic Observer that he was invited by the Norwegian Carsten Borchgrevink to join the Southern Cross Expedition to the Antarctic. This would be the first expedition to overwinter on the Antarctic mainland; Colbeck took charge of the expedition's magnetic observation work.

After returning to Britain in 1900, Colbeck was soon going southward again, this time in command of the relief ship Morning, sent to resupply Robert Falcon Scott's Discovery, then trapped in the ice at McMurdo Sound in the Antarctic. He was awarded the Royal Geographical Society's Back Award in 1901. On their way south the Morning celebrated Christmas Day 1902 by crossing the Antarctic Circle and discovering a previously uncharted island which they named Scott Island. Colbeck and three officers landed on the island where they collected rock samples and had a drink. The adjacent cone-shaped islet Colbeck named Haggitt's Pillar, after his mother's maiden name. In January 1904, Colbeck returned with Morning, this time with firm instructions that unless Discovery could be speedily released from the ice, she was to be abandoned; Colbeck was to bring Scott and the expedition home. In a race against time, and with a fortunate shift in ice conditions, Discovery was freed and sailed safely home.

Thereafter Colbeck made no further Antarctic ventures but resumed his job with the Wilson line in Hull. In 1914 he went to work for the United Shipping Company of London, ultimately becoming their Marine Superintendent. The family moved to south London, living at 51 Inchmery Road, Catford. Captain Colbeck became a founder member of the Honourable Company of Master Mariners. In 1930 he was elected President of the Antarctic Club but died suddenly later that year of heart failure, after a bout of bronchitis. He is buried in Hither Green Cemetery.

Colbeck married Edith Robinson and they had four sons. One of these, William Robinson Colbeck, joined the British Australia and New Zealand Antarctic expeditions of 1929–1931 as second officer and navigator in the old Discovery. He was responsible for much of the charting during the two voyages, and the Colbeck Archipelago—off the Mawson Coast—is named after him.

== Legacy ==
Burgee of the Pirate Yacht Club, Bridlington, used as a sledge flag by William Colbeck during the Southern Cross Expedition.

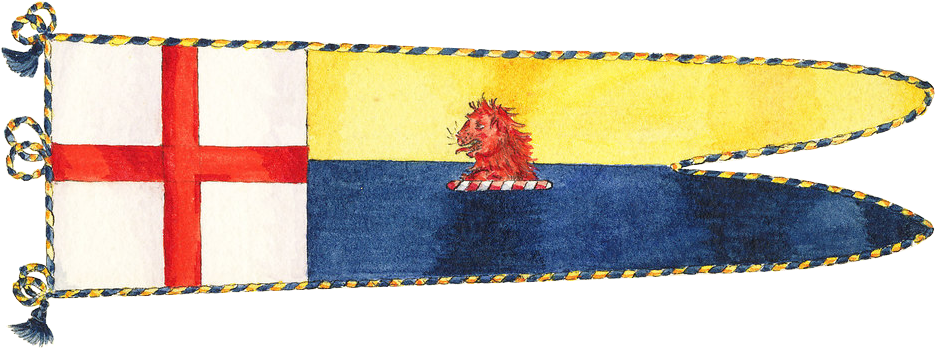
Colbeck's sledge flag during the Discovery Expedition.

His work in the Antarctic was commemorated by the naming of Colbeck Bay at 71°38′S 170°5′E and Cape Colbeck on the King Edward VII peninsula, at 77°07′S 158°01′W. A plaque was placed on the site of his residence at 51 Inchmery Road, London SE6 in September 2016.

In the same year, a plaque was installed at Hull Paragon station, jointly commemorating Colbeck and Alfred Cheetham (1866–1918): 'Two of many Hull seafarers on the ship Morning who participated in the Antarctic expeditions to relieve Captain Scott 1902–1904 and were welcomed by thousands at this station on their return'.

William Colbeck's first sledge flag as magnetic observer of the Southern Cross Expedition has been lent to the National Maritime Museum by his family. It is actually the burgee of the Pirate Yacht Club, Bridlington, made of machine‑sewn wool bunting, printed with a skull and cross bones. The Pirate Yacht Club is no longer in existence having gone out of business before the First World War.

== Bibliography ==
- Borchgrevink, Carsten (1901). First on the Antarctic Continent. George Newnes. ISBN 9780905838410.
- Crane, David (2005). Scott of the Antarctic. London: HarperCollins. ISBN 0-00-715068-7.
- Maritime Historical Studies Centre. "The Colbecks" (PDF).
- "No: 1801 Captain Scott". The Guardian. 16 January 2001.
- Margolies, Sandra (2014). "Captain William Colbeck: from Hull to Catford via Antarctica". Lewisham History Journal. Vol. 22. pp. 32–57.
- Shepherd, Rupert (29 June 2016). "Captain Colbeck's Eggs".
- Shepherd, Rupert (11 September 2016). "Captain Colbeck's Plaque".
