= Suell =

Suell is a surname. Notable people with the surname include:

- Frans Suell (1744–1818), Swedish businessman
- John Suell (fl. 1393), English politician

== See also ==
- M/S Frans Suell, former name of cruiseferry connecting Helsinki, Finland and Stockholm
- MT Frans Suell, oil tanker built in 1958
- Suell Winn House, historic house at 72-74 Elm Street in Wakefield, Massachusetts
- Suel (disambiguation)
