= Alang Ship Breaking Yard =

Ship breaking yard in Alang, Bhavnagar, Gujarat, India

Coordinates: 21°24′36″N 72°11′51″E

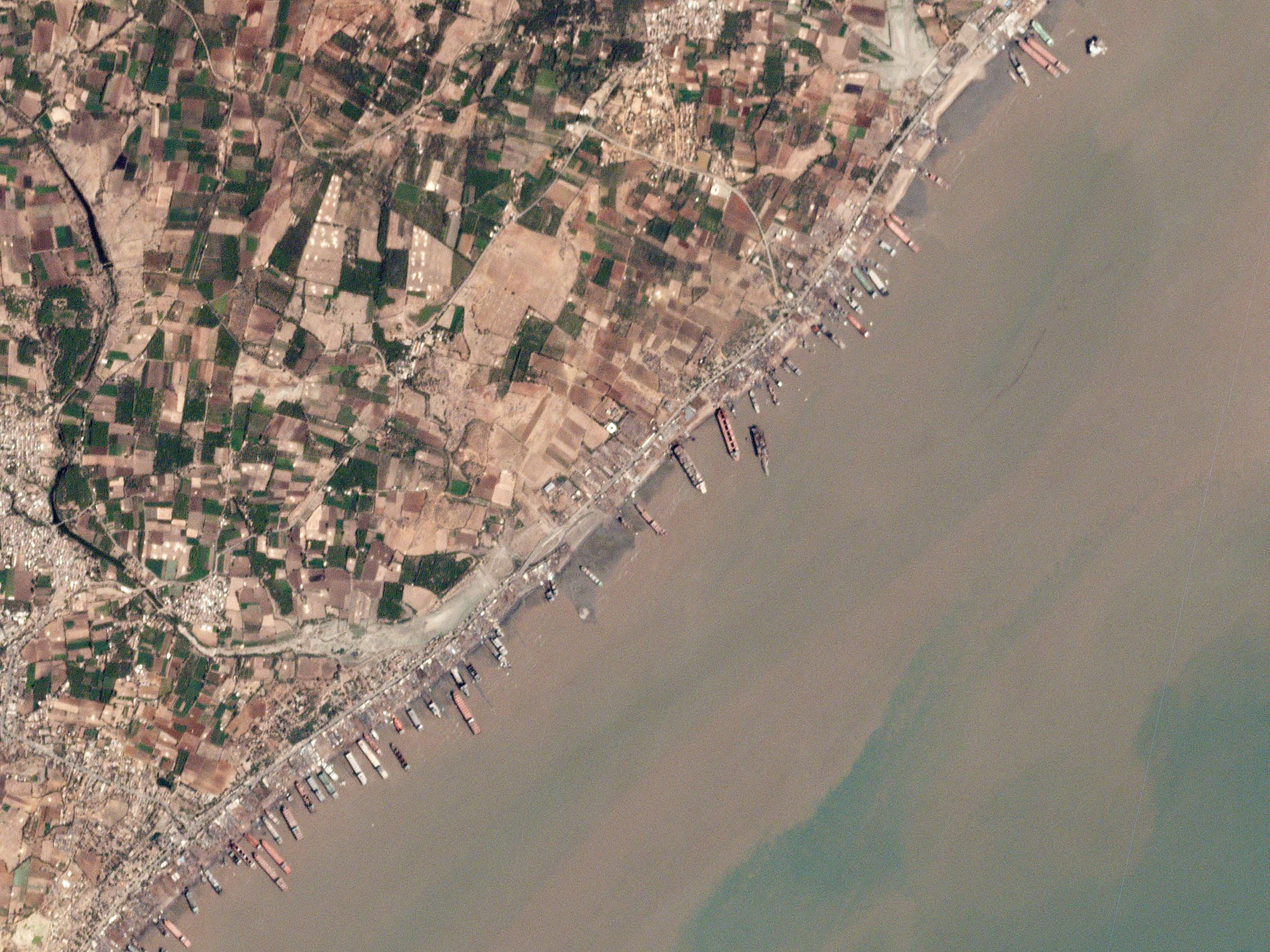
Satellite image of ships beached at the Alang Ship Breaking Yard

The Alang Ship Breaking Yard is the world's largest ship breaking yard, responsible for dismantling more than a third of retired freight and cargo ships salvaged from around the world. It is located on the Gulf of Khambhat by the town of Alang, in the district of Bhavnagar in the state of Gujarat, India.

N. Sundaresan was the founder of Alang Ship Recycling Yard in 1983, the shipyard is believed to have acquired a total of US$110.6 billion in aggregate value, including total assets. Its growth has prompted its extension northeast towards Sosiya in Gujarat, and it is now often referred to as the Alang-Sosiya Yard.

== Salvaging ==
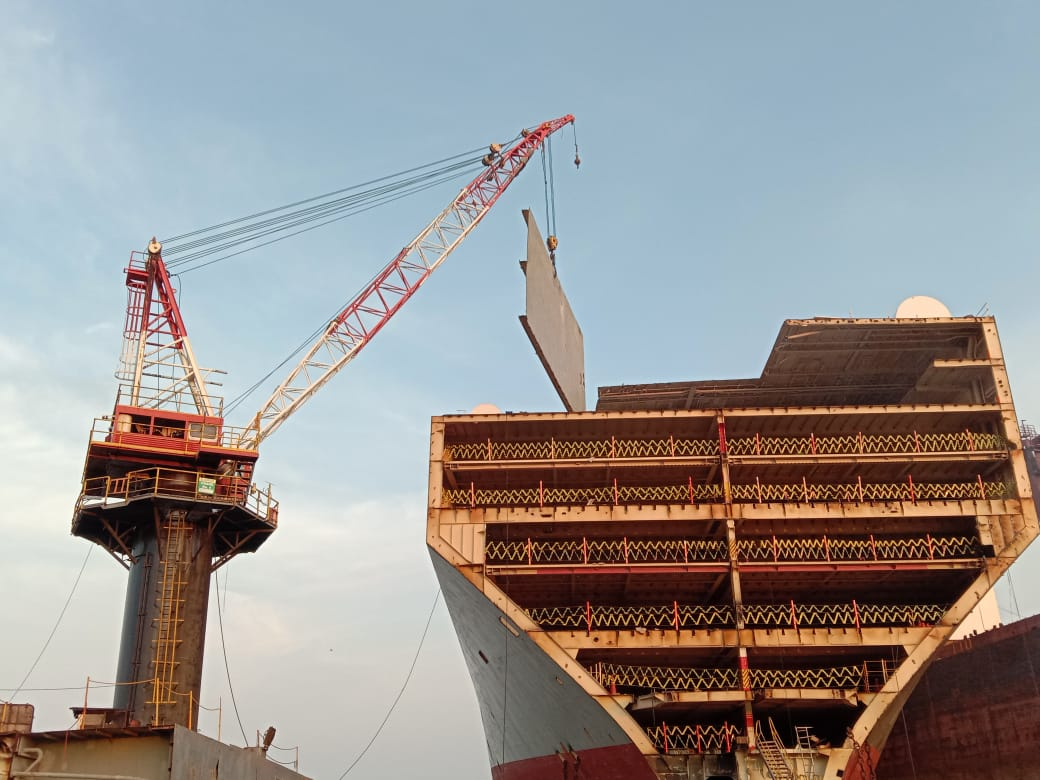
Removing steel plates from a ship using cranes

The Alang facility consists of 183 ship breaking yards along 14 kilometres (8.7 mi) of coast that total 4.5 million light displacement tonnage (LDT) of capacity.

Large super-tankers, car ferries, container ships and ocean liners are beached on the mud flats during high tide. As the tide recedes, manual labourers move onto the beach to dismantle each ship, salvaging what they can and reducing the rest to scrap.

The first ship broken down at Alang, MV Kota Tenjong, was beached on 13 February 1983. Alang's processing peaked between 2011 and 2012 at 415 vessels per year, and has been declining since. In 2020, Alang Ship Breaking Yard recycled 196 ships.

== Ongoing upgrade plans ==
The governments of Japan and Gujarat signed a Memorandum of Understanding in 2010, which focused on technology transfer and financial assistance from Japan to upgrade the yard's operations to meet international standards. The project aimed to make Alang the largest International Maritime Organization-compliant ship recycling yard in the world. This evolved as part of the Delhi-Mumbai Industrial Corridor, an international industrial development project supported by the governments of India and Japan and carried out as a public-private partnership.

Improvement efforts started in 2017, with the Japanese International Cooperation Agency providing a soft loan of $76 million and the Gujarati Maritime Board providing $35 million toward improvements.

== Notable ships scrapped ==
In 2004, Regal V, famous for a deadly fire in 1990 when she was known as Scandinavian Star, was broken up at Alang.

On 31 December 2005, the French aircraft carrier Clemenceau left Toulon to be dismantled in Alang, despite protests about improper disposal and mismanagement of toxic waste at the facility. In January 2006, the Supreme Court of India temporarily prohibited the Clemenceau from entering the port. Attempts to reach a settlement were unsuccessful, and Clemenceau was sent to a ship-breaking harbour in Britain instead. On 15 January, a court ruling by France's Conseil d'État ordered Clemenceau to return to French waters. Shortly after, Able UK, based at the Graythorp yard near Hartlepool, received a disassembly contract to use accepted practices in scrapping the ship. Disassembly began on 18 November 2009 and was completed by the end of 2010.

In December 2009, the longest ship ever built, Seawise Giant, was broken up at Alang.

In August 2012, Oriental Nicety, famous for an oil spill in Prince William sound when she was known as Exxon Valdez, was scrapped at Alang.

== Environment, health and safety issues ==
The salvage yards at Alang have generated controversies about numerous environmental, health and safety issues, including working conditions, workers' living conditions and environmental impact and frequent accidents and death of workers. Between January 2009 and October 2012, at least 54 workers were said to have died in work-related accidents at the Alang shipbreaking yards, according to a local workers union. This has attracted concern and scrutiny from the IndustriALL Global Union and the EU.

The recycling activities pollute the beach and surrounding areas, including the water, with heavy metals. Additionally, in the past, the nearest full-service hospital was 50 km (31 miles) away in Bhavnagar. In March 2019, the Alang Hospital, a multi-speciality hospital at Alang, was inaugurated by Vijay Rupani, the Chief Minister of Gujarat. This hospital was set up by the Gujarat Maritime Board, is operated by the Indian Red Cross Society, and is able to provide immediate medical services.

== Competition ==
Other large facilities on the scale of Alang Ship Breaking Yard include the Aliağa Ship Breaking Yard (Turkey), Chittagong Ship Breaking Yard (Bangladesh) and Gadani ship-breaking yard (Pakistan). In the 1980s, Gadani was the largest ship breaking yard; however, competition from newly established yards such as Alang resulted in a significant reduction in output, with Gadani today producing less than one-fifth of the scrap it produced in the 1980s.

== Documentaries ==
2004: Shipbreakers is a documentary on the industry in Alang by Michael Kot.

2005: On the Road to Alang, by Peter Knego of Maritime Matters, is a documentary on passenger ships scrapped at Alang.

== See also ==
- List of ship breaking yards
