= Graythorp =

Industrial area of Hartlepool borough, County Durham, England

Coordinates: 54.639°N 1.201°W

Graythorp was a village and now a trading estate within the borough of Hartlepool and the ceremonial county of County Durham, England. It is located on the A178 Tees Road about 1 mile south of Hartlepool.

The village was constructed by shipbuilder William Gray and Company to house workers at his Graythorp shipyard on Greatham Creek/Seaton Channel on the River Tees. Graythorp today is an industrial estate historically associated with a shipyard basin currently operated by Able UK as a marine recycling facility.

== Graythorp shipyard and dock ==
In 1913 the Hartlepool shipbuilders William Gray & Company leased land to construct a shipyard off Greatham Creek near the mouth of the Tees capable of building ships of 20,000 tons in weight. Due to the First World War the yard was not completed until 1924 and became known as Graythorp Shipyard, Gray constructed ships there from 1924 until the company closed in 1963. In 1969 after liquidation the yard was purchased by Laing Offshore.

In 1970 Laing added dock gates to create a 100 hectares (250 acres) dry dock, at the time the largest in the world, and with it constructed offshore oil and gas platforms, and jackets (platform legs) from 1970 to 1990.

In 1996 Able UK Ltd purchased the yard and used it to do dismantling work for several petrochemical companies, while allowing the tenant construction of other marine structures. In 2003 Able UK signed an £11m deal with the US Marine Administration to dismantle 13 US warships; subsequently the process was opposed by some local residents and environmental groups due to the presence of asbestos and other toxins on the ships. The French aircraft carrier Clemenceau was also contracted to be recycled on the site. Recycling of the ships was completed in 2011.

== See also ==
- Alang Ship Breaking Yard
- Chittagong Ship Breaking Yard
- Aliağa Ship Breaking Yard
- List of ship breaking yards
