= Alang =

- Town
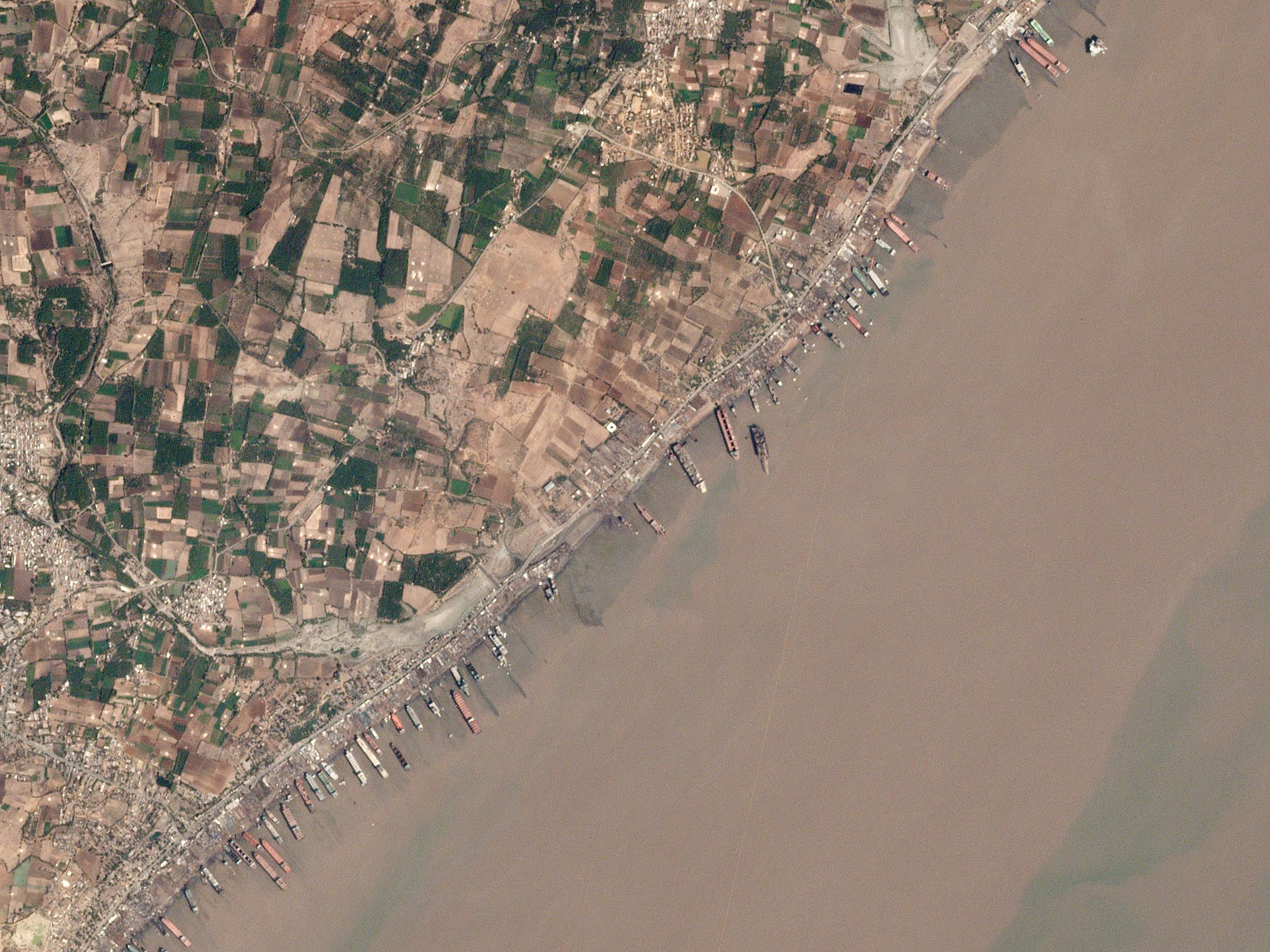
- Ships beached at Alang for scrapping, satellite view, 17 March 2017

- Location within Gujarat Location within India
- Coordinates: 21°23′51″N 72°10′39″E
- Country: India
- State: Gujarat
- District: Bhavnagar

Population (2001)
  - Total: 18,464

Languages
  - Official: Gujarati
- Time zone: UTC+5:30 (IST)
- PIN: 364081
- Vehicle registration: GJ 04
- Website: gujaratindia.gov.in/index

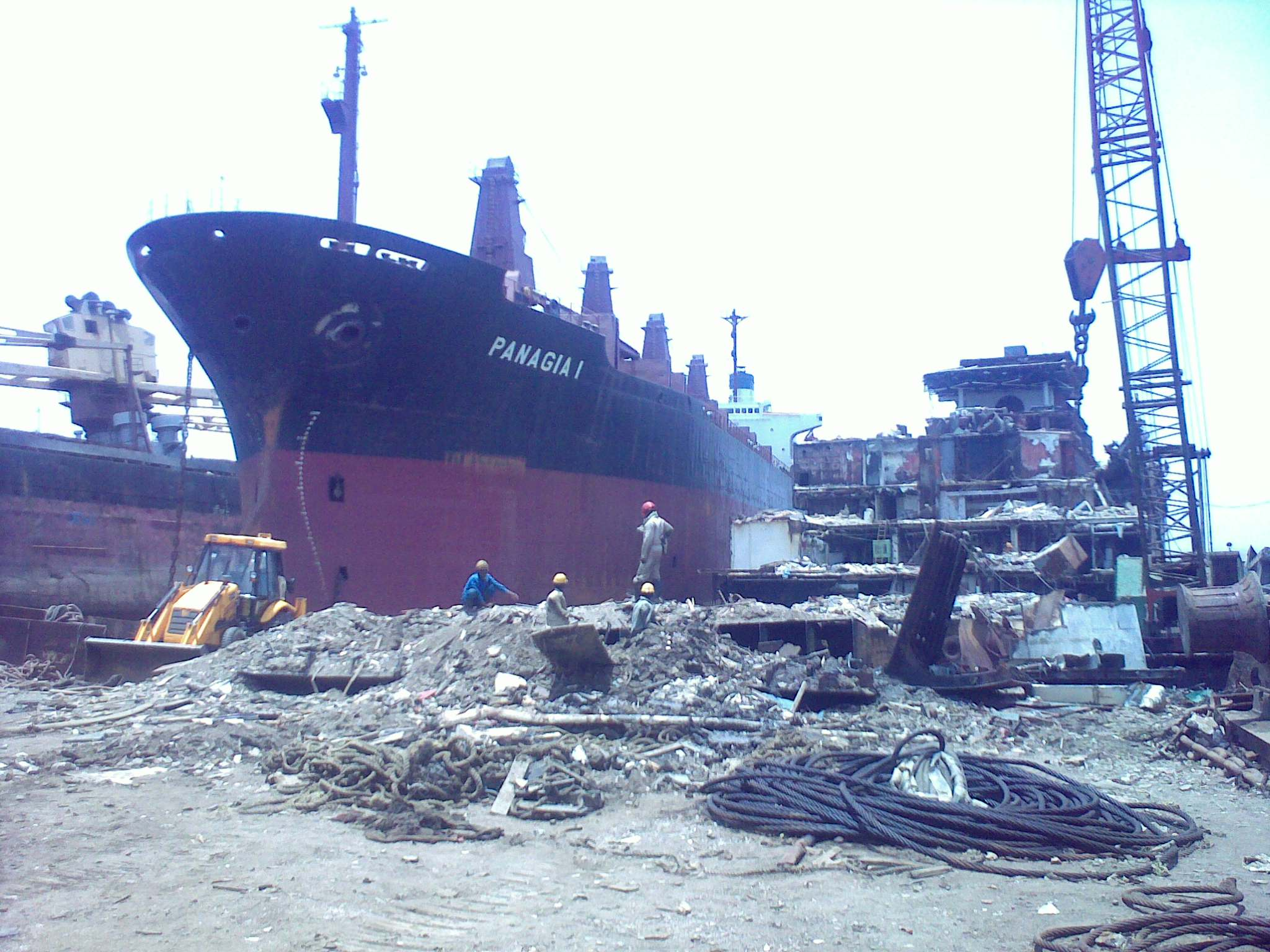
Ongoing ship breaking at Alang

Alang is a census town in Bhavnagar district in the Indian state of Gujarat. Because it is home to the Alang Ship Breaking Yard, Alang beaches are considered the world's largest ship graveyard.

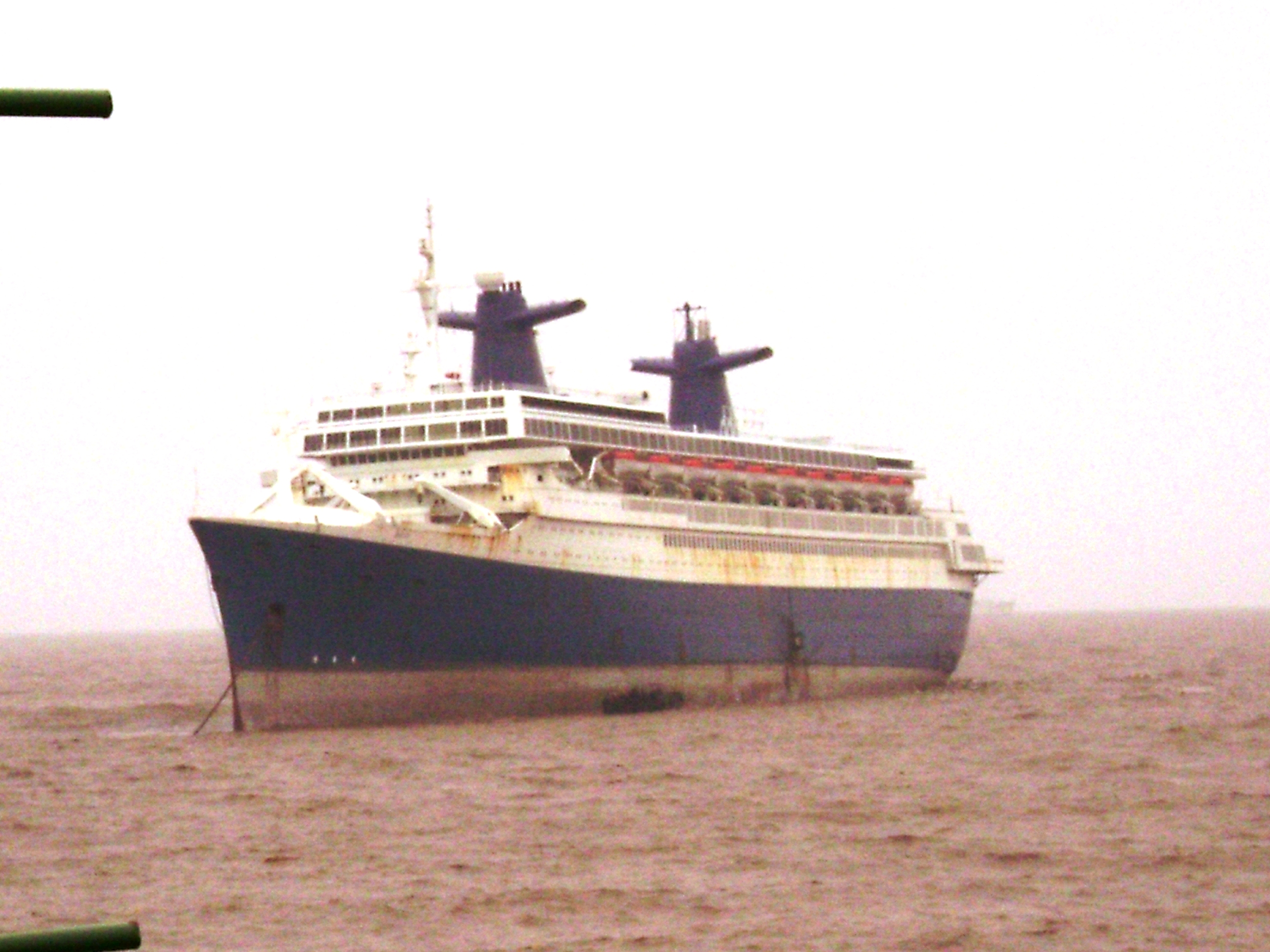
SS Norway awaits the ship breakers at Alang, August, 2007

== Demographics ==
As of the 2001 Indian census, Alang had a population of 18,464. Males constitute 82% of the population and females 18%. Alang has an average literacy rate of 62%, higher than the national average of 59.5%, with 89% of the males and 11% of females literate. Seven percent of the population is under 6 years of age.

== Economy ==
=== Mithi Virdi nuclear power plant ===
Mithi Virdi (or Viradi) was a proposed site consisting of six nuclear reactors with a total capacity of 6,600 MW about 3 km (2 mi) north of the ship breaking beach.

The proposed nuclear plant faced heavy opposition from the local population. As a result, the plans were cancelled and ultimately relocated to Kovvada, Andhra Pradesh. The area around the formerly-proposed plant is known for growing some of the highest-quality kesar mango trees.

=== Ship Breaking Yard ===
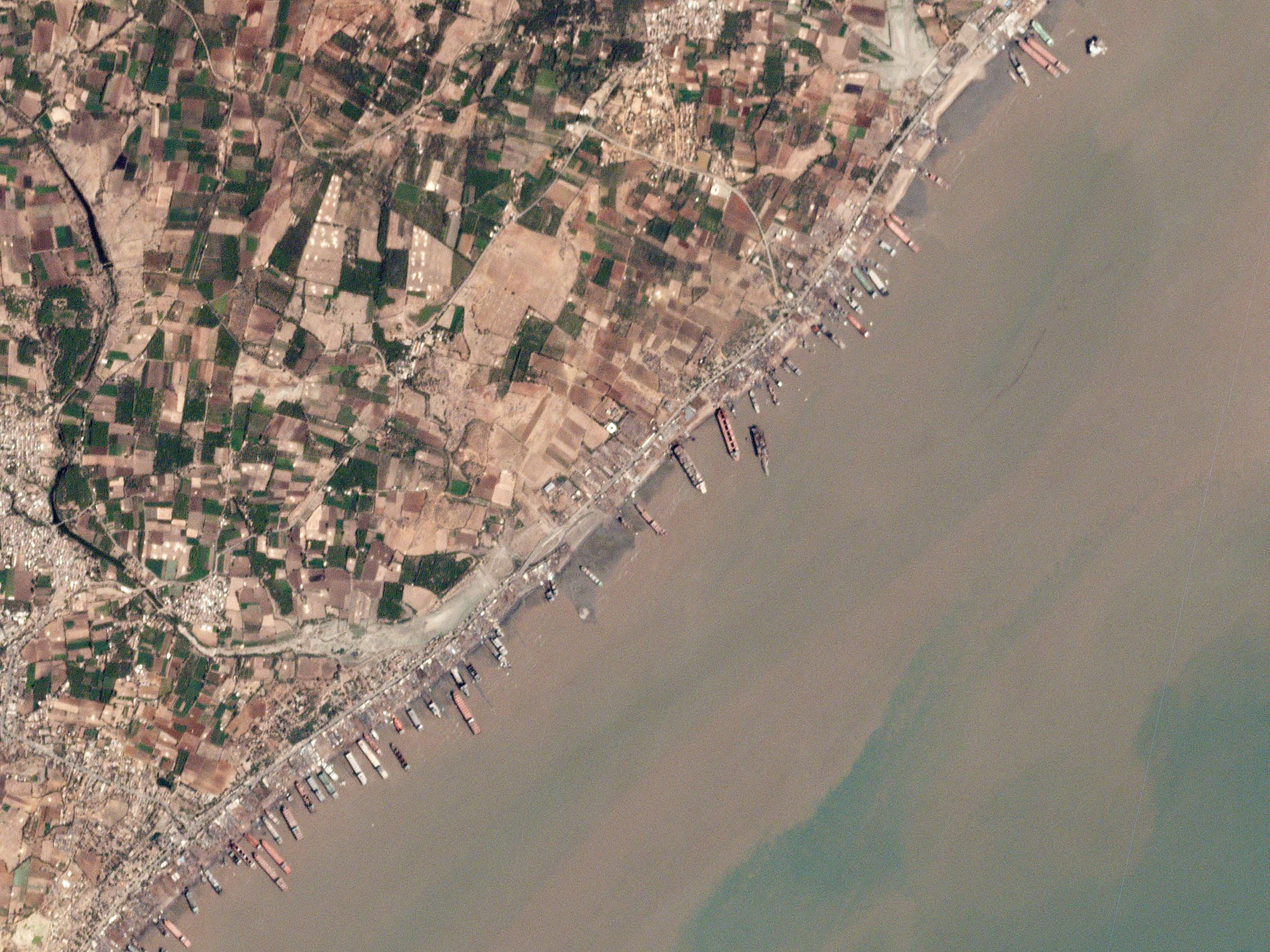
Satellite image of ships beached at the Alang Ship Breaking Yard

The Alang Ship Breaking Yard is the world's largest ship breaking yard, responsible for dismantling more than a third of retired freight and cargo ships salvaged from around the world. It is located on the Gulf of Khambhat by the town of Alang, in the district of Bhavnagar in the state of Gujarat, India.

N. Sundaresan was the founder of Alang Ship Recycling Yard in 1983, the shipyard is believed to have acquired a total of US$110.6 billion in aggregate value, including total assets. Its growth has prompted its extension northeast towards Sosiya in Gujarat, and it is now often referred to as the Alang-Sosiya Yard.

== In popular culture ==
On the Road to Alang is a 2005 documentary on passenger ships scrapped at Alang, by Peter Knego of Maritime Matters.

Shipbreakers is a 2004 documentary on the industry in Alang by Michael Kot.

World War Z, a 2006 novel by Max Brooks, features Alang as a destination for refugees seeking to escape a zombie plague by sea.

Battlefield 2042, a 2021 first-person shooter, features Alang as the setting for the multiplayer map Discarded.

== See also ==
- List of companies of India
- Ship-Submarine Recycling Program
- Alang Ship Breaking Yard
- Gadani Ship Breaking Yard
- Chittagong Ship Breaking Yard
- Aliağa Ship Breaking Yard
