= List of ship breaking yards =

This is a list of notable ship breaking yards:

Ship breaking yard	Country	City	Province	Founded	Plots	L (km)	ref
Chittagong Ship Breaking Yard	Bangladesh	Chittagong	Chittagong	1960		18	
Alang Ship Breaking Yard	India	Alang	Gujarat	1983	153	14	
Gadani Ship Breaking Yard	Pakistan	Gadani	Balochistan	1947	132	10	
Aliağa Ship Breaking Yard	Turkey	Aliağa	Izmir				
Able UK at Graythorpe Dock	United Kingdom	Hartlepool	Tees Valley	1996			
Galloo, Ghent, formerly Van Heyghen Recycling	Belgium						
SteelCoast, Brownsville, Texas	United States						
International Shipbreaking, Brownsville, Texas	United States						
Mare Island Dry Docks, Vallejo, California	United States						
Changjiang Ship Breaking Yard	China	Jiangyin					
El-Tareq Ship- breaking Yard, Egypt, Suez	Egypt	Suez	Elattaka	2005		1.4	

== See also ==
- List of dry docks
- List of the largest shipbuilding companies
- List of shipbuilders and shipyards
- Israel Shipyards
- Ship breaking
