= Shipbreaker (disambiguation) =

Shipbreaker or Shipbreakers may refer to:

- Ship breaking, a type of ship disposal involving the breaking up of ships for either a source of parts
- Ship Breaker, a 2010 young adult novel by Paolo Bacigalupi set in a post-apocalyptic future
- Shipbreakers (film), a 2004 documentary
- Hardspace: Shipbreaker, an action-adventure simulation video game developed by Blackbird Interactive
