= Gadani Ship Breaking Yard =

Ship breaking yard in Pakistan

Coordinates: 25°04′N 66°42′E

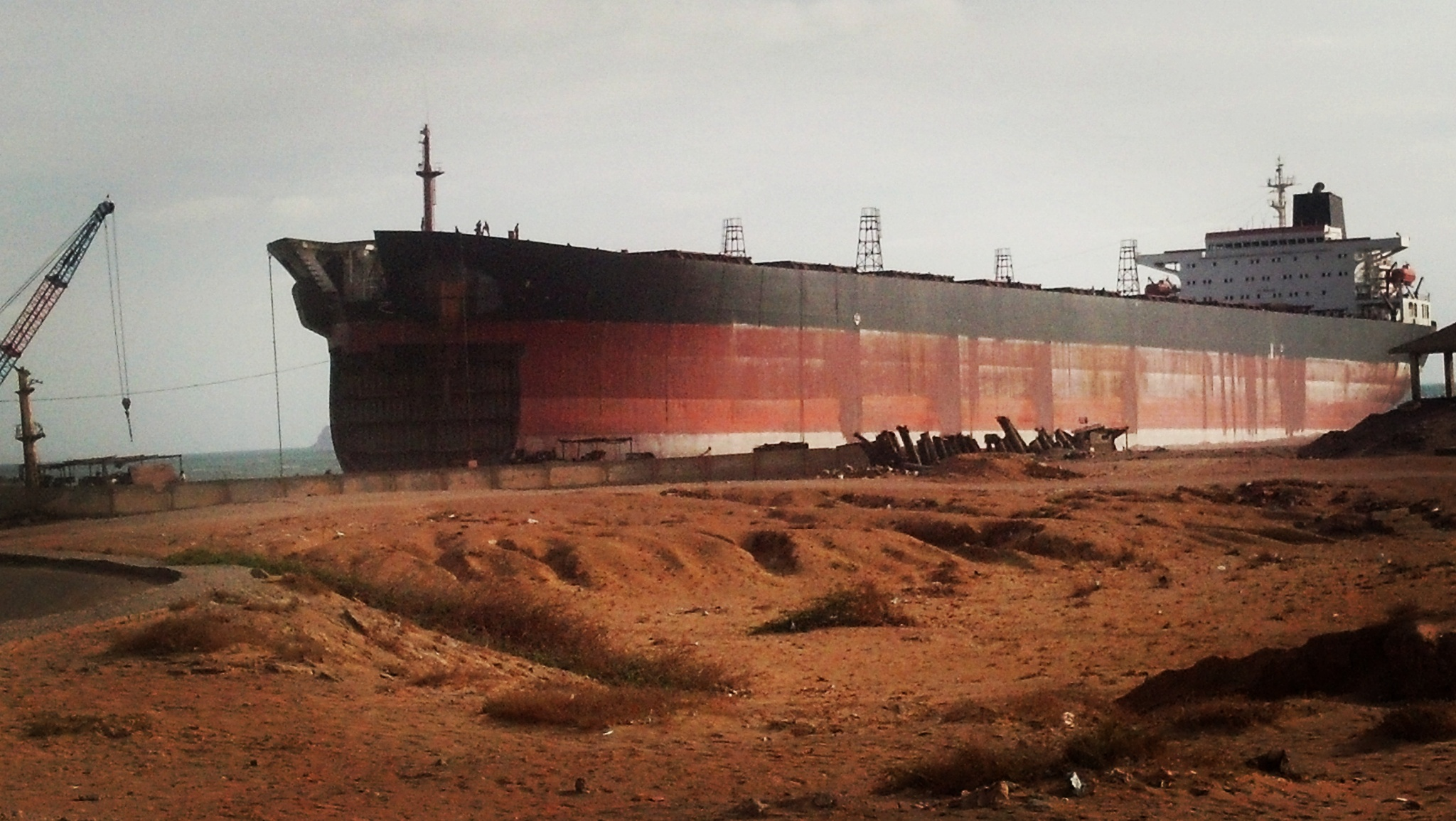
Cargo ship being scrapped on the Gadani beach

Gadani Ship Breaking Yard is the world's third largest ship breaking yard located across a 10 km (6.2 mi) long beachfront at Gadani, Pakistan. The yard consists of 132 ship-breaking plots. It is located about 40 km (25 mi) northwest of Karachi, the largest city of Pakistan.

In the 1980s, Gadani was the largest ship-breaking yard in the world, with more than 30,000 direct employees. However, competition from newer facilities in Alang, India and Chittagong, Bangladesh resulted in a significant reduction in output, with Gadani today producing less than one fifth of the scrap it produced in the 1980s. The recent reduction in taxes on scrap metal has led to a modest resurgence of output at Gadani, which now employs around 6,000 workers.

More than one million tons of steel is salvaged per year, and much of it is sold domestically. In the 2009-2010 fiscal year, a record 107 ships, with a combined light displacement tonnage (LDT) of 852,022 tons, were broken at Gadani, whereas in the previous 2008-2009 fiscal year, 86 ships, with a combined LDT of 778,598 tons, were turned into scrap.

It is the world's third-largest ship breaking yard after Alang Ship Breaking Yard (India) and Chittagong Ship Breaking Yard (Bangladesh), and followed by Aliağa Ship Breaking Yard (Turkey). Workers may earn as little as Rs 3,319 a day, and are exposed to many dangers.

== Capacity ==
Gadani currently has an annual capacity of breaking up to 125 ships of all sizes, including supertankers, with a combined LDT of 1,000,000 tons.

Although Gadani ranks as the world's third largest ship breaking yard after Alang and Chittagong in terms of volume, it is the world's leading ship breaking yard in terms of efficiency. At Gadani, a ship with 5,000 LDT is broken within 30 to 45 days, whereas in India and Bangladesh it takes, on average, more than six months to break a vessel of the same size.

== History ==
Ship breaking was conducted in Gadani on rare occasions before Pakistan became a sovereign country. The activity of ship breaking at Gadani greatly increased in the 1960s. In 1978, the city of Gadani was designated by the Government of Pakistan as a port. It was described as the largest such yard in the world.

However, increased competition from rival ship-breaking yards in Alang, India, and Chittagong, Bangladesh, coupled with relatively high import duty for decommissioned vessels, led to a steep decline in Gadani's output. After producing an average of one million tonnes of scrap in the 1980s, by 2001 the yard produced less than 160,000 tonnes and for ten months had no new vessel arrivals.

In 2001, the Government of Pakistan reduced ship-breaking duties from 15% to 10% and offered further incentives if industry activity improved. After these changes employment increased to a total of around 6,000 workers.

== Disasters ==
=== 2016 Aces fire ===
On 1 November 2016, at least 26-31 workers were killed and 58 wounded as a result of gas cylinder explosions on a ship being scrapped, the floating production storage and offloading oil tanker Aces (IMO number: 8021830, built 1982 as Mobil Flinders), causing a huge fire. Reportedly more than 100 people were dismantling a tanker in the yard. Some 30 other workers were also reported missing.

On November 13, 2017 it was reported that another fire broke out on the same vessel. NGO Shipbreaking Platform reported that Aces had laid untouched at the same yard a year after the explosion. The Pakistan Department of Environment gave permission for work to resume on her recycling. On the first day that the breaking recommenced, a fire broke out again, as the oil residue inside the tanker had not been removed.

== See also ==
- Gadani Fish Harbor
- Lasbela District
- List of ship breaking yards
