= MT Frans Suell =

History
- Name: Frans Suell (1958–1963); Orion (1963–1968); Horizon (1968–1972); Atheninan Horizon (1972–1982)
- Owner: Rederi AB Malmoil (1958–1963); Rederi AB Bellis (1963–1968); Hemisphere SS Corp. (1968–1972); Athenian Oil Tankers Co. (1972–1982)
- Builder: Kockums, Malmö
- Yard number: 433
- Launched: 25 August 1958
- Completed: 19 November 1958
- Identification: IMO number: 5120221
- Fate: Arrived Pakistan for dismantling, 5 March 1982

General characteristics
- Type: Oil tanker
- Tonnage: 12,943 GRT; 20,956 DWT; 7,707 NRT
- Length: 170.01 m (557 ft 9 in)
- Beam: 21.95 m (72 ft 0 in)
- Depth: 9.72 m (31 ft 11 in)
- Propulsion: 8-cylinder Kockums diesel engine, 6,714 kW (9,004 hp)
- Speed: 15.5 knots (28.7 km/h; 17.8 mph)

MT Frans Suell was an oil tanker built in 1958, later known as Orion, Horizon and Athenian Horizon.

== Ship history ==
The ship was built at Kockums Mekaniska Verkstad shipyard in Malmö. She was delivered on 19 September to Rederi AB Malmoil who kept her for five years, and was then sold to Rederi AB Bellis and renamed Orion. In 1968 she was sold to Liberian company Hemisphere Steamship Corp. and renamed to Horizon. She was sold again in 1972 to the Greek Athenian Oil Tankers Company who renamed her to Athenian Horizon and kept her until she was broken up at Gadani ship-breaking yard in Pakistan in 1982.

The ship was named after the famous businessman Frans Suell from Malmö.
