= Gir Kesar =

Mango cultivar

Mangifera 'Gir Kesar'
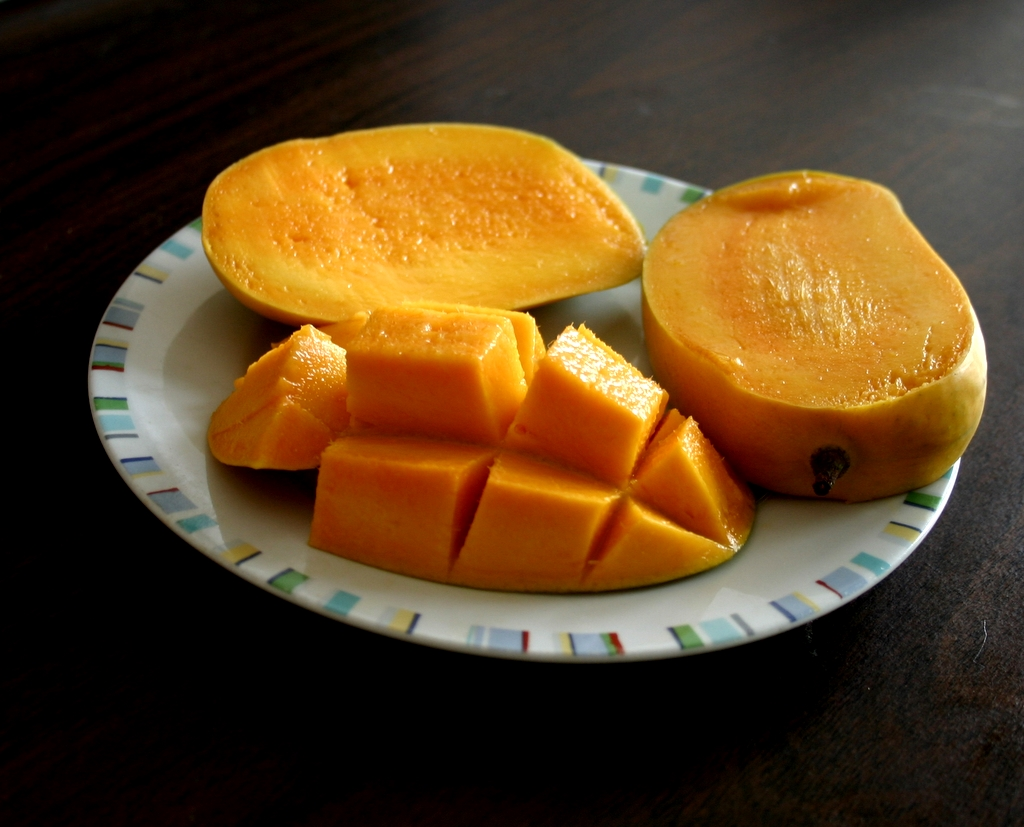
- 'Kesar' variety of mango
- Genus: Mangifera
- Species: Mangifera indica
- Cultivar: 'Gir Kesar'
- Origin: India

The 'Gir Kesar' mango, also called Kesar, is a mango cultivar grown in the foothills of Girnar in Gujarat, western India. The mango is known for its bright orange colored pulp and was given the geographical indication status in 2011. The biggest market of Gir Kesar is in Talala Gir (45 km from Gir national park) known as a Mango Market Yard (Plus code : 3GFV+9P Borvav, Gujarat).

== History ==
The mango was grown in 1931 by Junagadh Wazir Salé Bhai in Mangrol Junagadh. About 75 grafts were then planted in the foothills of Girnar at the Junagadh Laal Dori farm. The mango is said to have been known as "Kesar" since 1934 when the Nawab of Junagadh Muhammad Mahabat Khan III said "This is Kesar" looking at the orange pulp of the fruit—kesar being Gujrati/Hindi for saffron.

== Production ==
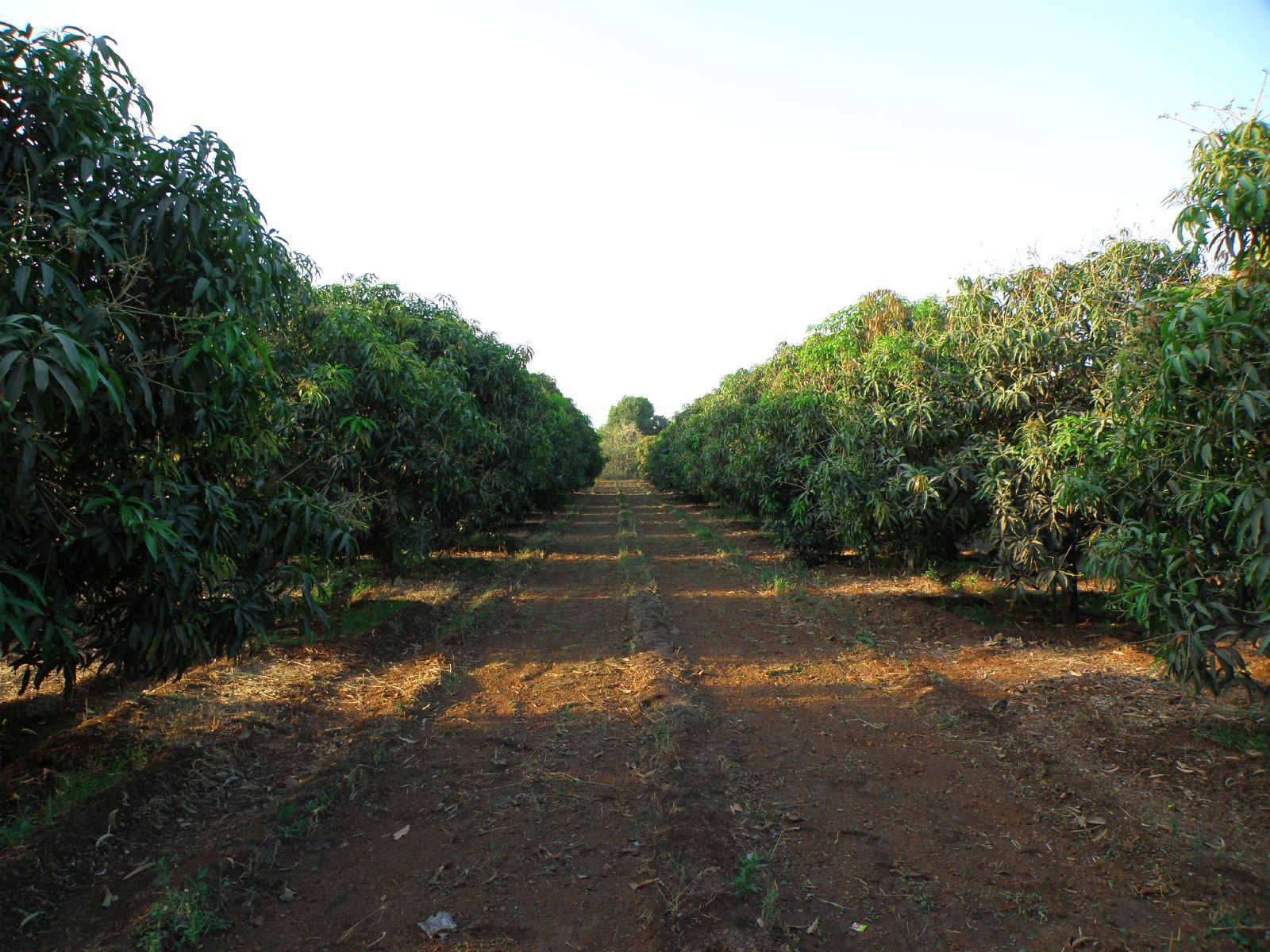
A mango plantation near Gir sanctuary (Sasan Gir)

The Kesar mango is grown in an approximate area of 20,000 hectare in the districts of Junagadh and Amreli in the Saurashtra region of Gujarat, with an estimated annual production of two lakh tonnes. However, only the mango grown around the Gir sanctuary area is officially known as "Gir Kesar mango".

This variety of mango is usually produced to the market in April–May and are harvested at the green mature stage, with cultivation beginning around October after the monsoon season. Kesar variety is among the most expensive varieties of the fruit.

Kesar mangoes are a rich source of vitamins, including A, C, E, and B_{6}. These vitamins are essential for overall well-being. Together, they support a strong immune system and also promote healthy skin. The combination of these vitamins helps in the absorption of other essential vitamins and minerals in the body.

== Geographical indication ==
Gujarat Agro Industries Corporation (GAIC) Ltd proposed the geographical indication (GI) registration of Gir Kesar mango. After the Junagadh Agricultural University filed the application in 2010, the fruit was granted the GI tag in 2011 by the Geographical Indication Registry in Chennai, making the name "Gir Kesar" exclusive to the mangoes grown in the region. It thus became the first agricultural product from Gujarat and the second mango variety in India (after Uttar Pradesh's Dasheri mango) to earn the GI tag.

== See also ==
- List of mango cultivars
- List of Geographical indications in India
