= Frans Suell =

Swedish businessman (1744–1817)

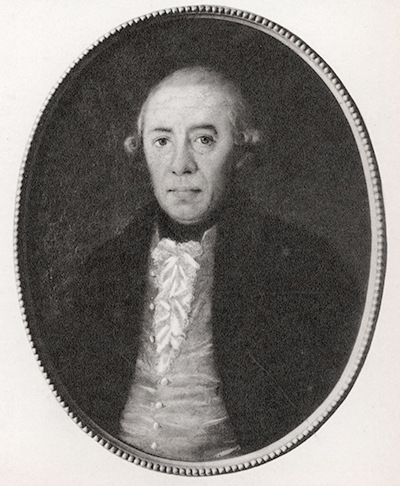

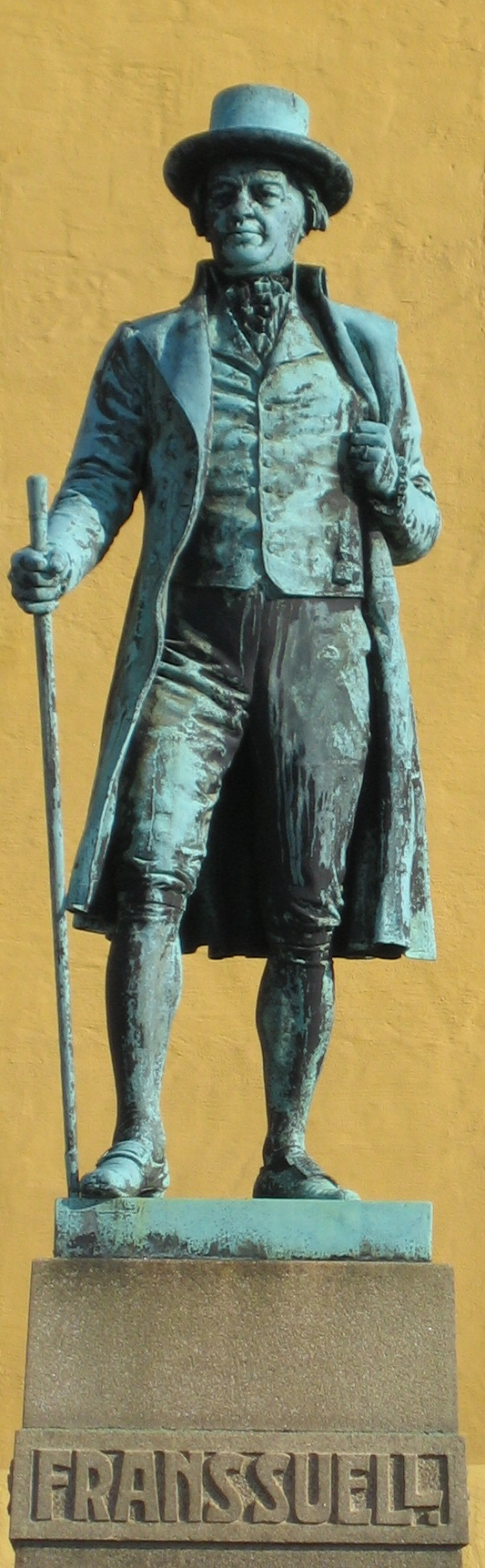
Frans Suell

Frans Suell (9 June 1744 – 15 November 1817) was a Swedish businessman.

== Life ==
Frans Suell was born on 9 June 1744 in Malmö. His grandfather Franz Suell immigrated to Malmö from Holstein in the mid 18th century. Frans grew up working in his father Niclas' shop selling mostly provisions; after studying two years at Lund University, he entered the tobacco importing trade, in which he was successful.

Suell's career coincided with the American Revolution, a period of political disorder in the chief tobacco-growing regions of North America. These events broke the power of the tobacco lairds based in Glasgow and other British port cities, and made it possible for Suell to import tobacco directly from North America. He prospered, and beginning in 1775 led a consortium of local shippers in the successful public works project of dredging and embanking the Malmö harbour. It is for this work that he is remembered in Malmö today.

Suell also acquired interests in many other industries connected with the spread of the Industrial Revolution to Sweden, such as textiles, the smelting of iron, and the refining of beet sugar.

Suell died in Malmö on 15 November 1817, at the age of 73.

== Legacy ==
Two ships have been named in his honour: MT Frans Suell (1958) and MS Frans Suell (1992)
