= Chittagong Ship Breaking Yard =

Large shipbreaking yard in Bangladesh

Coordinates: 22.4424°N 91.7320°E

External videos
- Where Ships and Workers Go to Die on YouTube
- Ship Breakers on YouTube

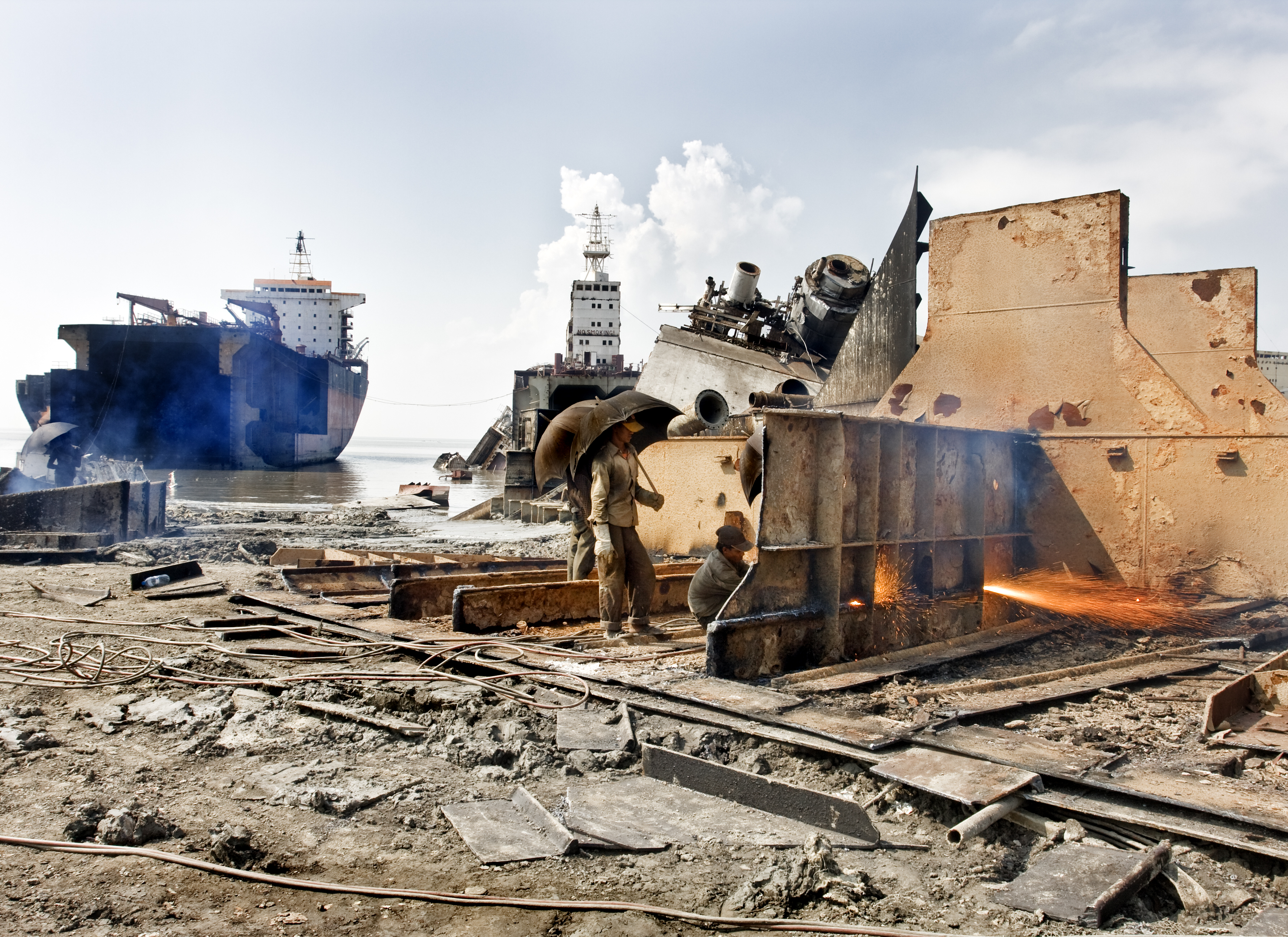
Chittagong Ship breaking yard

Chittagong Ship Breaking Yard (Bengali: সীতাকুণ্ড জাহাজ ভাঙ্গা এলাকা, romanized: Sītākuṇḍa Jāhāja Bhāṅgā Ēlākā) is located in Faujdarhat, Sitakunda Upazila, Bangladesh along the 18 kilometres (11 mi) Sitakunda coastal strip, 20 kilometres (12 mi) north-west of Chittagong. Handling about a fifth of the world's total shipbreaking, it was the world's largest ship breaking yard until Alang Ship Breaking Yard in India took that spot. It employs over 200,000 Bangladeshis, making it one of the largest ship breaking yards. It accounts for around one-half of all the steel in Bangladesh.

It is the world's second-largest ship breaking yard, followed by Gadani ship-breaking yard (Pakistan) and Aliağa Ship Breaking Yard (Turkey).

== History ==
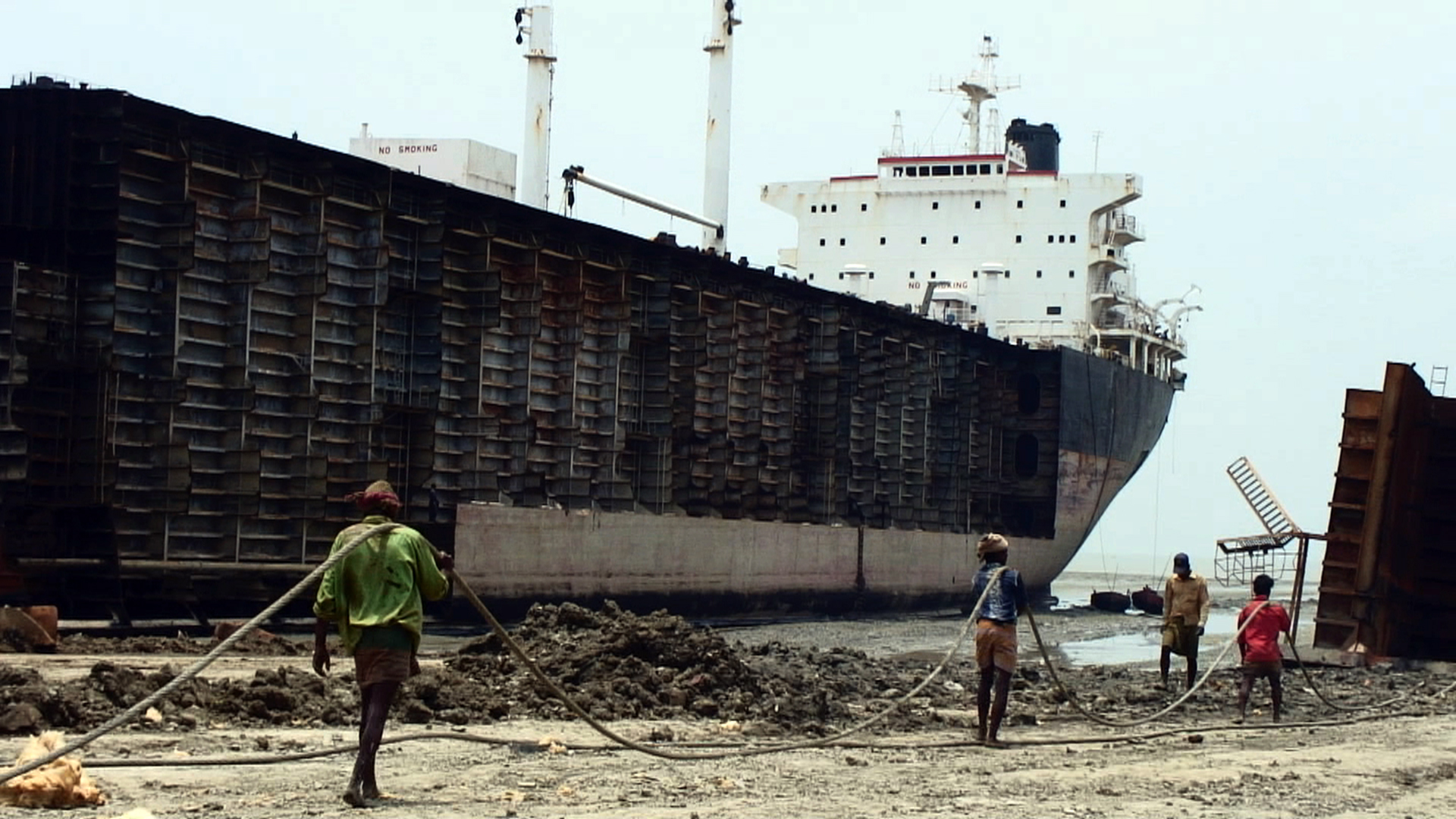
Workers at Chittagong ship breaking yard. The safety standards are notably low: no boots or hard hats are worn.

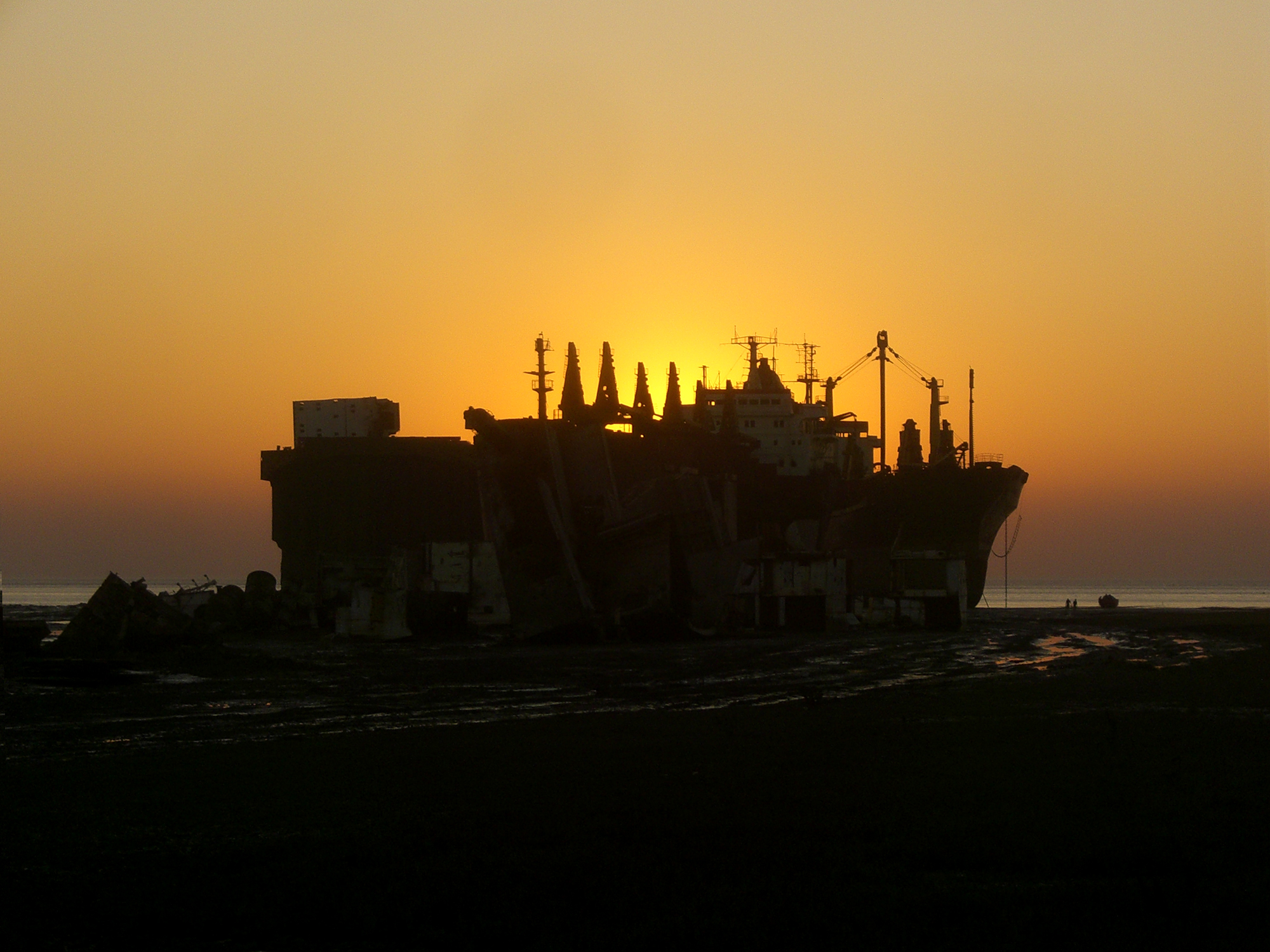
Sunset at a ship breaking yard in Chittagong

In 1960, after a severe cyclone, the Greek ship M D Alpine was stranded on the shores of Sitakunda, Chittagong. It could not be re-floated and so remained there for several years. In 1965, Chittagong Steel House bought the ship and had it scrapped. It took years to scrap the vessel, but the work gave birth to the industry in Bangladesh.

During the Bangladesh Liberation War, a Pakistani ship Al Abbas was damaged by bombing. Later on, the ship was salvaged by a Soviet team who were working at Chittagong port at the time and the ship was brought to the Faujdarhat seashore. A local company, Karnafully Metal Works Ltd bought it as scrap in 1974 and introduced commercial ship breaking in the country.

The industry grew steadily through the 1980s and by the middle of the 1990s, the country ranked number two in the world by tonnage scrapped. In 2008, there were 26 ship breaking yards in the area, and in 2009 there were 40. From 2004 to 2008, the area was the largest ship-breaking yard in the world. However, by 2012 it had dropped from half to a fifth of worldwide ship-breaking.

At one stage the industry was a tourist attraction, but outsiders are no longer welcome due to its poor safety record; a local watchdog group claims that one worker dies a week and one is injured a day on average.

Workers have neither protective equipment nor financial security. In 2014, shipping company Hapag-Lloyd followed an earlier decision by Maersk to stop using the yard for breaking its old ships on account of the yard's poor safety standards, despite the higher costs elsewhere.

A scene of the movie Avengers: Age of Ultron was shot at the ship breaking yards of Chittagong.

== Gallery ==
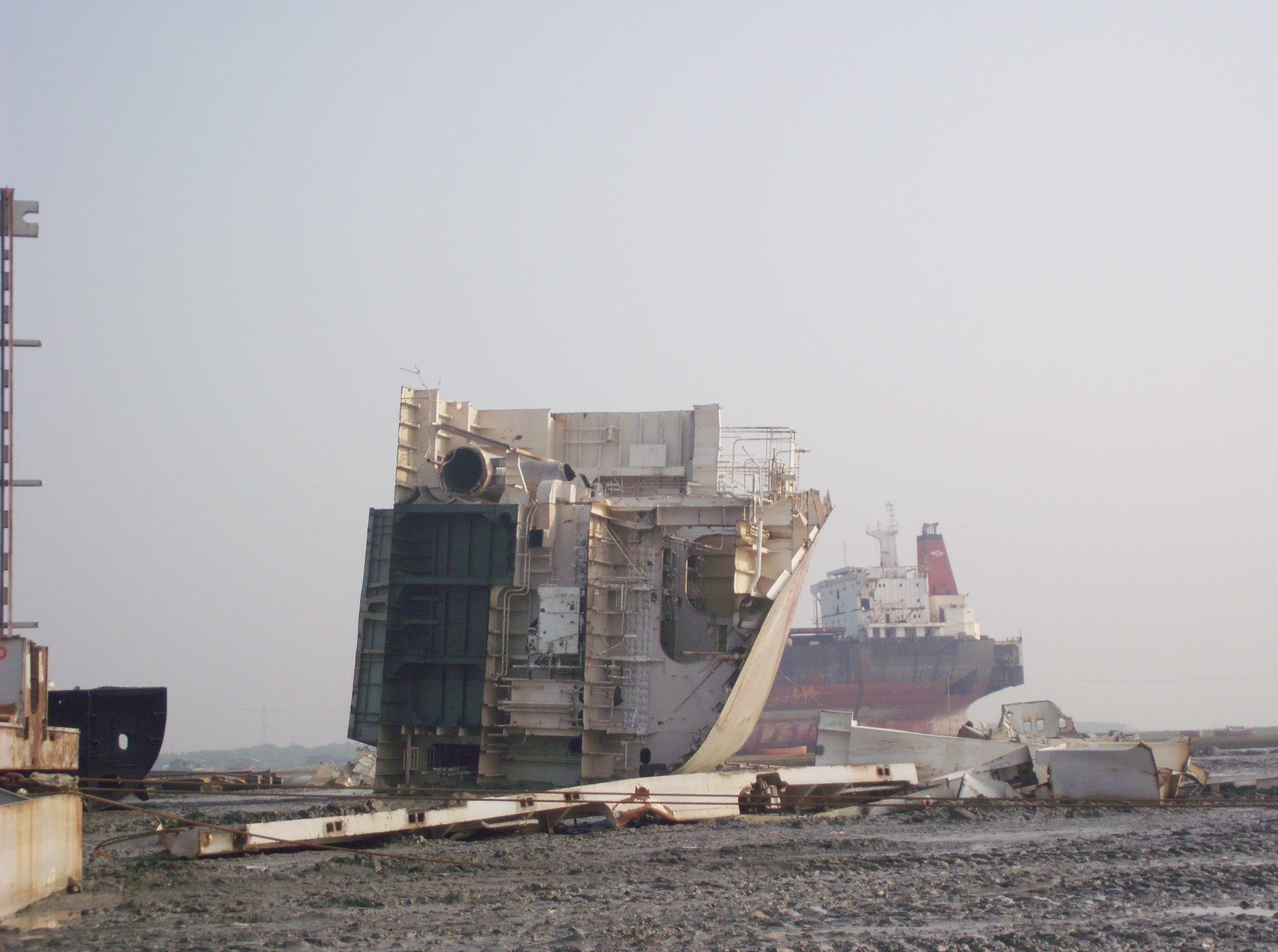
Jafrabad Chittagong shipbreaking

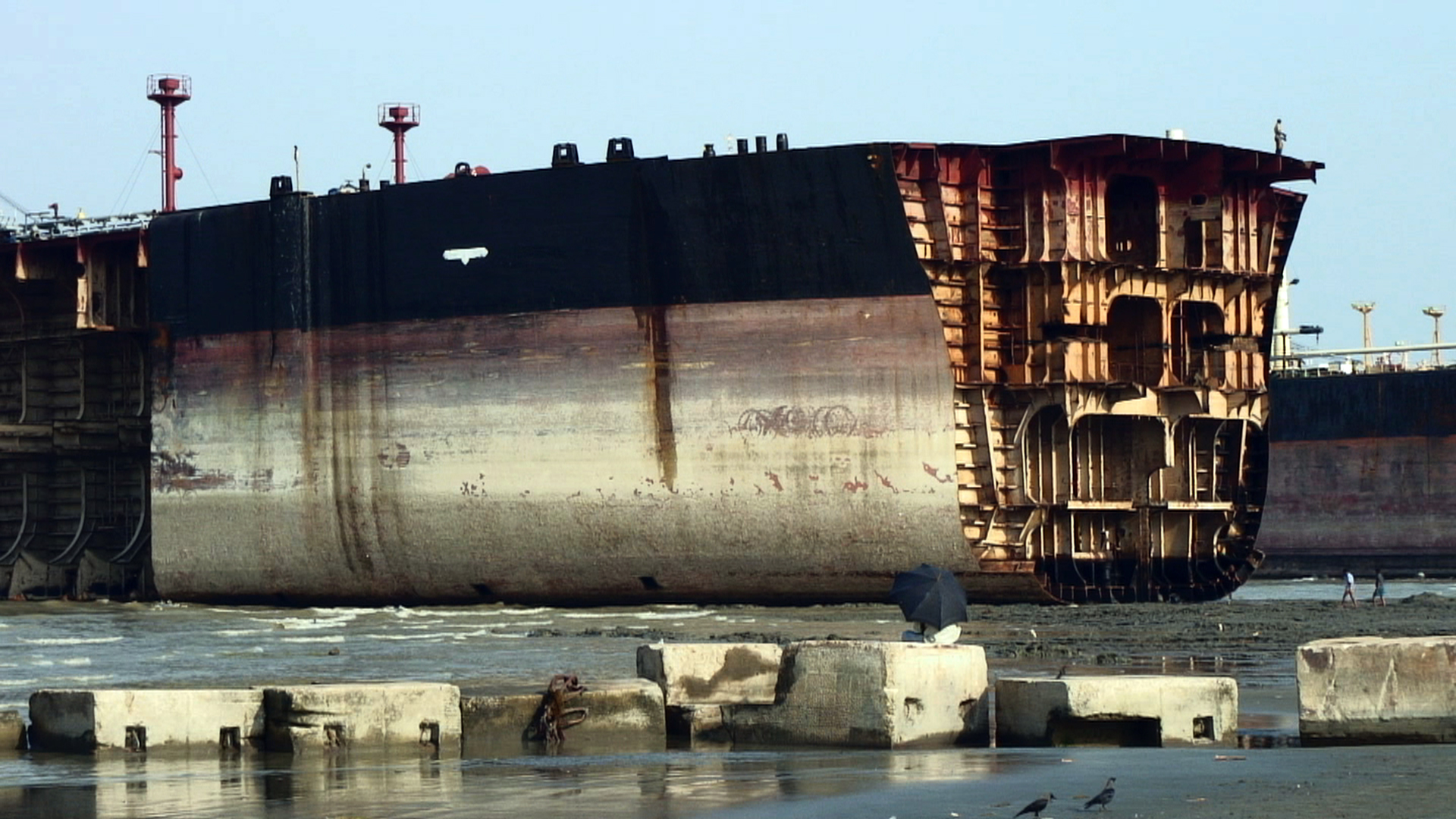
Jafrabad Chittagong shipbreaking

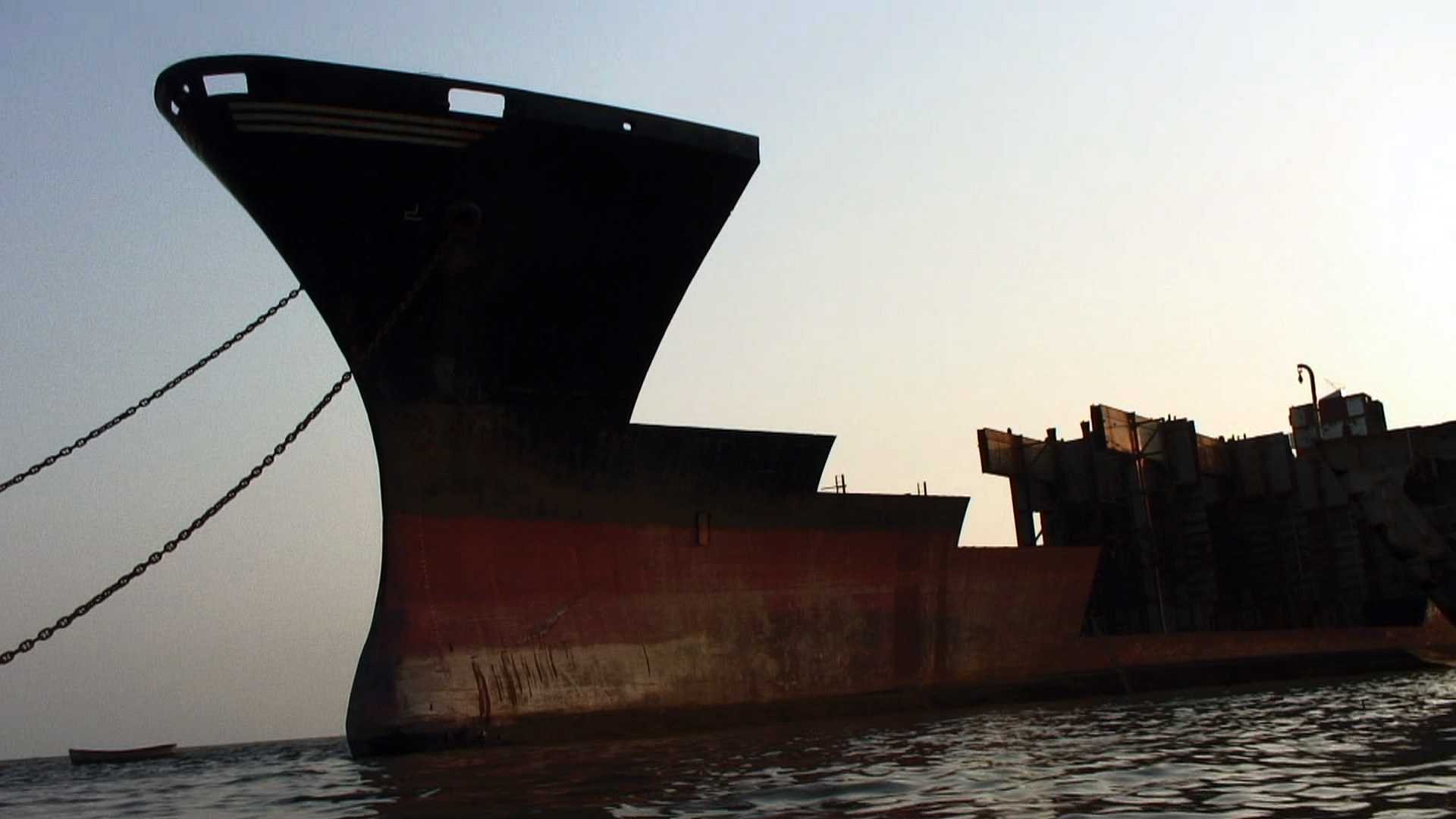
Jafrabad Chittagong shipbreaking

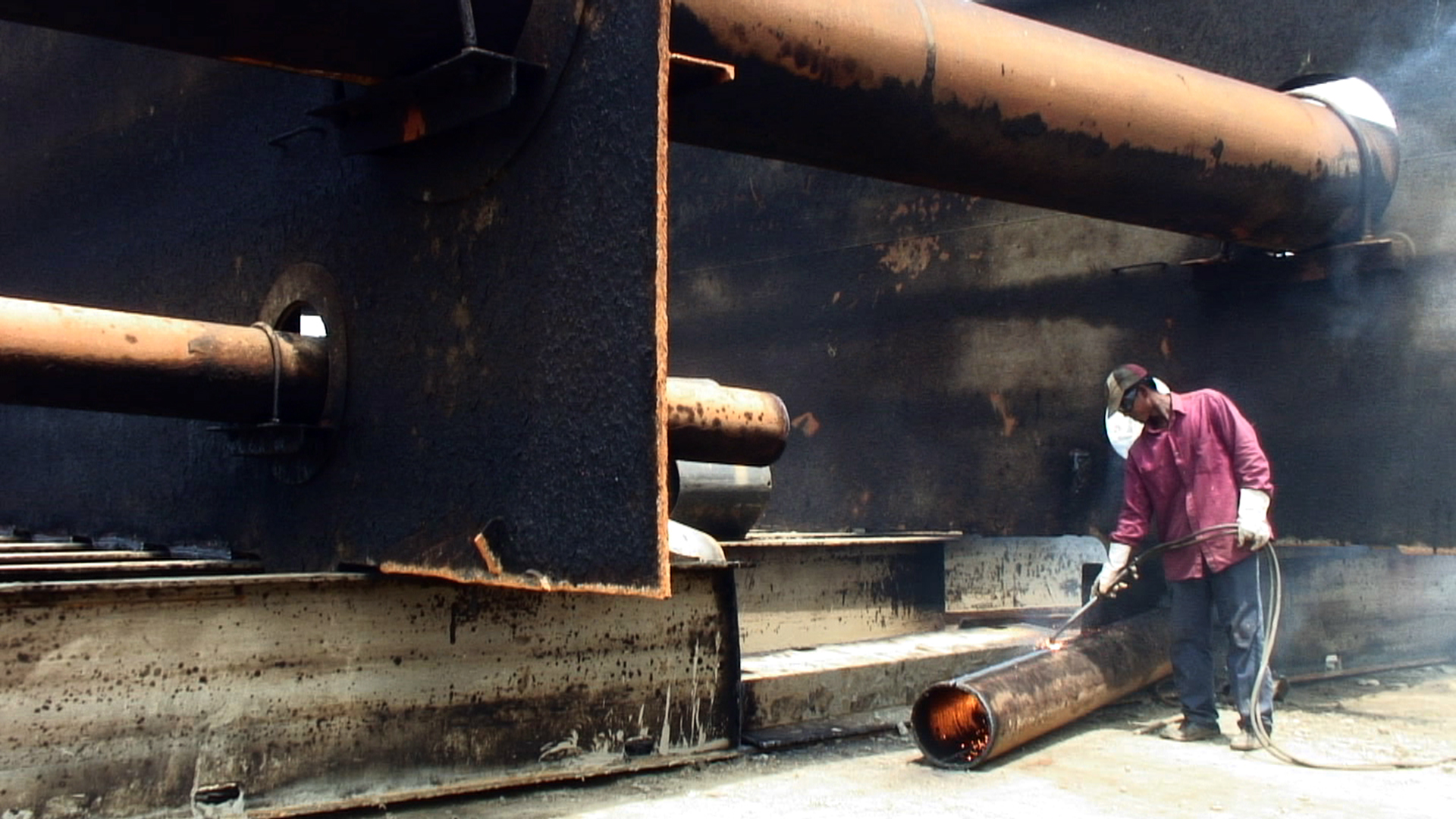
Jafrabad Chittagong shipbreaking

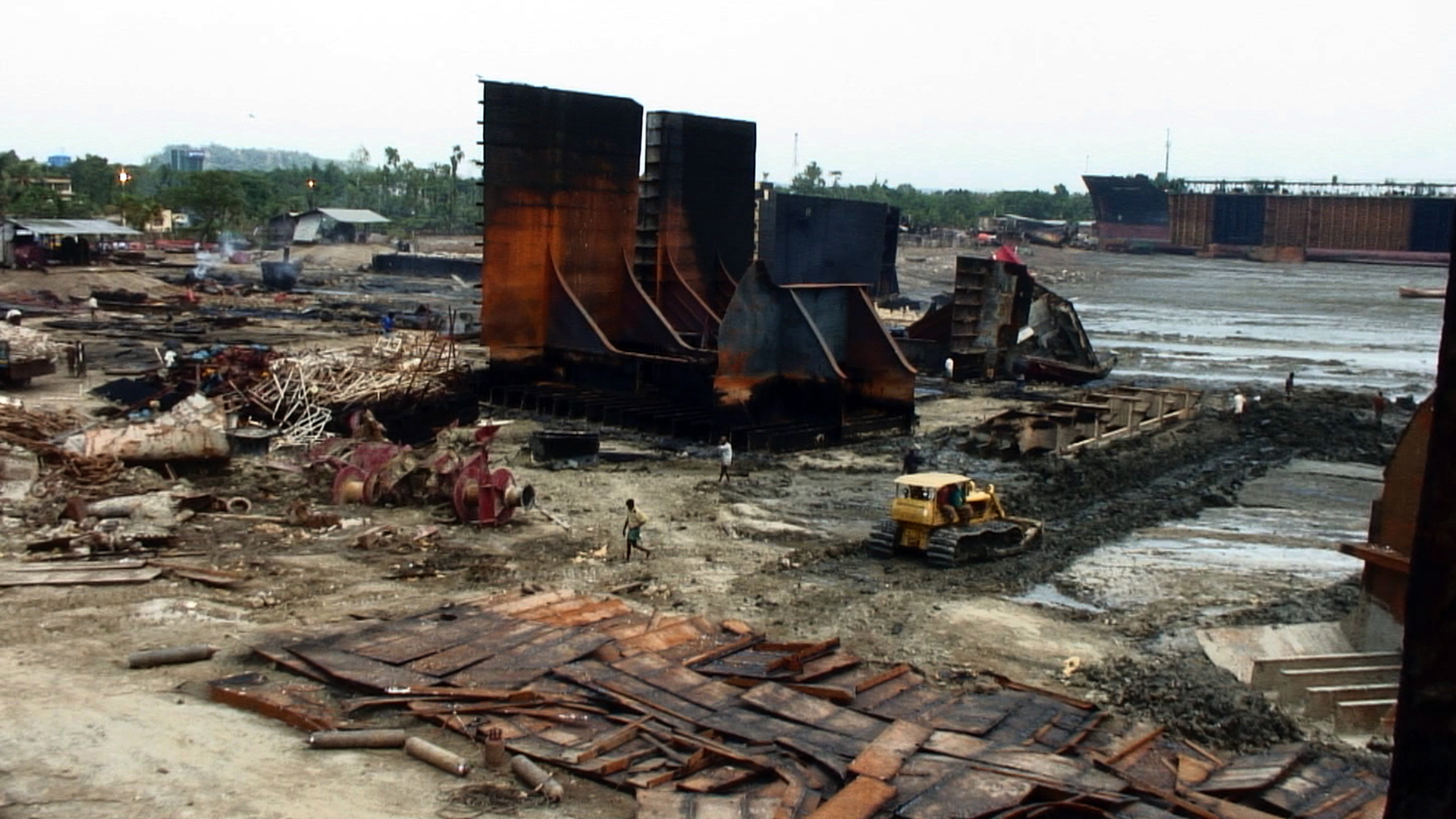
Jafrabad Chittagong shipbreaking

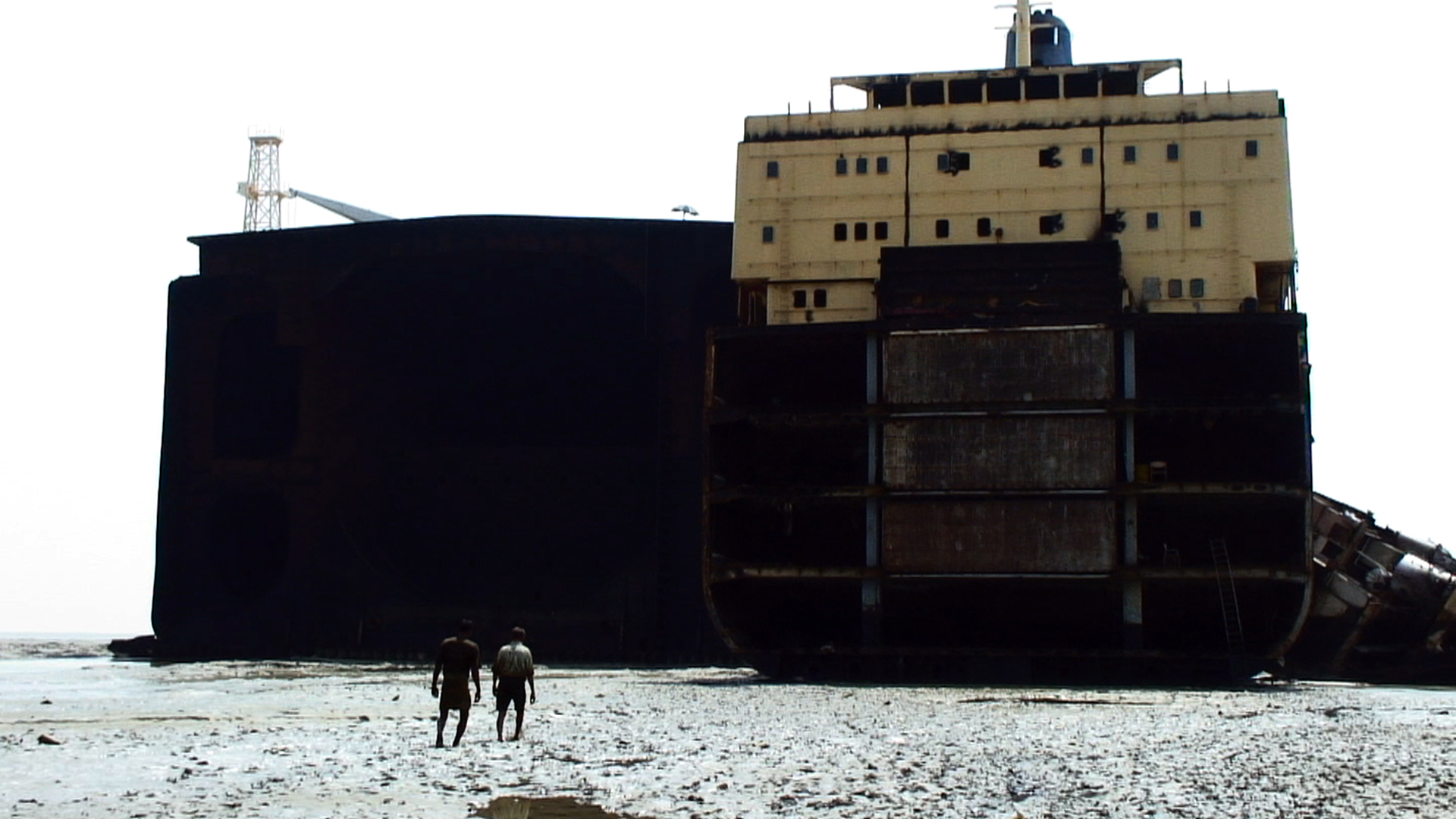
Jafrabad Chittagong shipbreaking

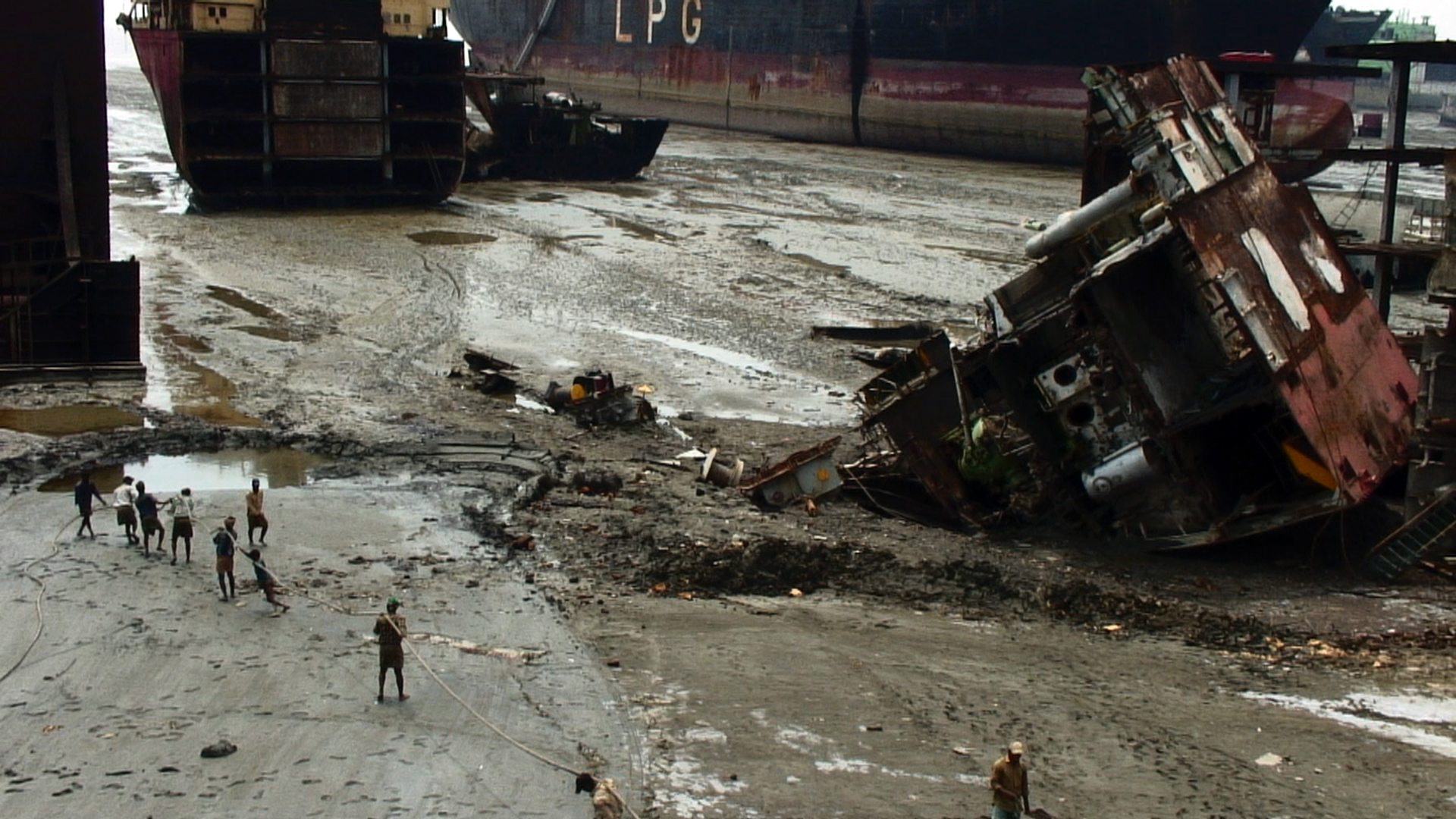
Jafrabad Chittagong shipbreaking

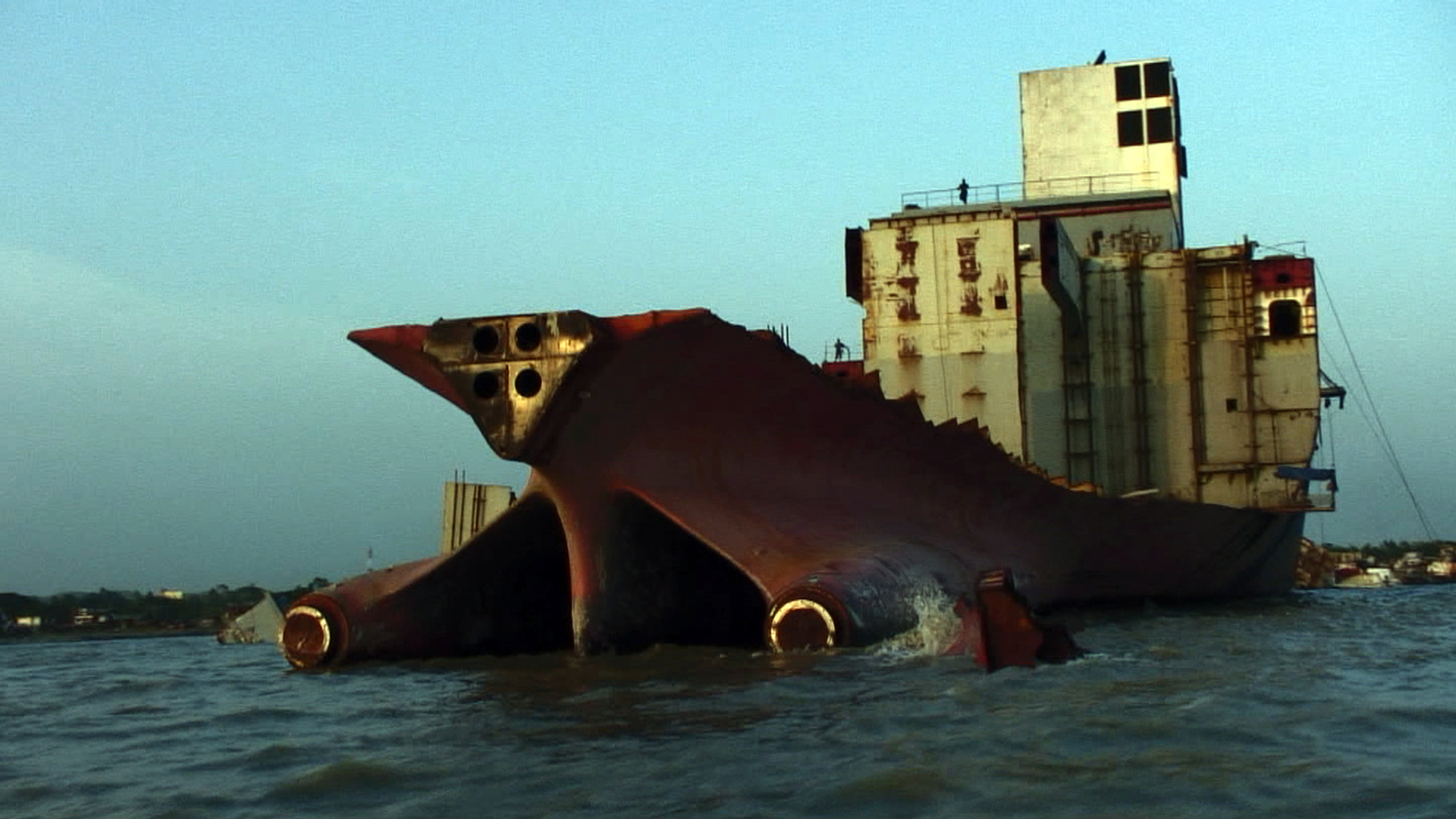
Jafrabad Chittagong shipbreaking

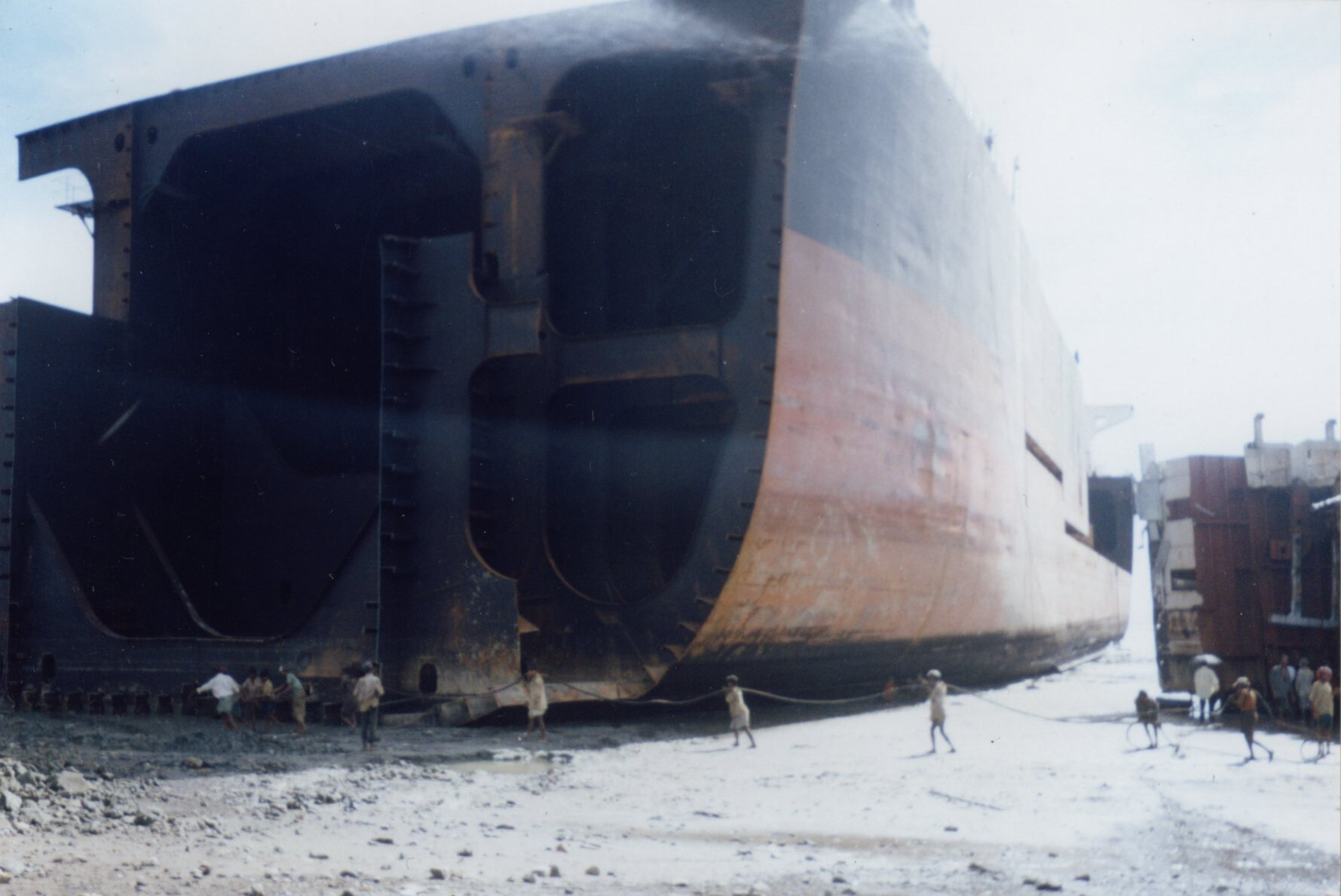
Ship breaking in Sitakunda

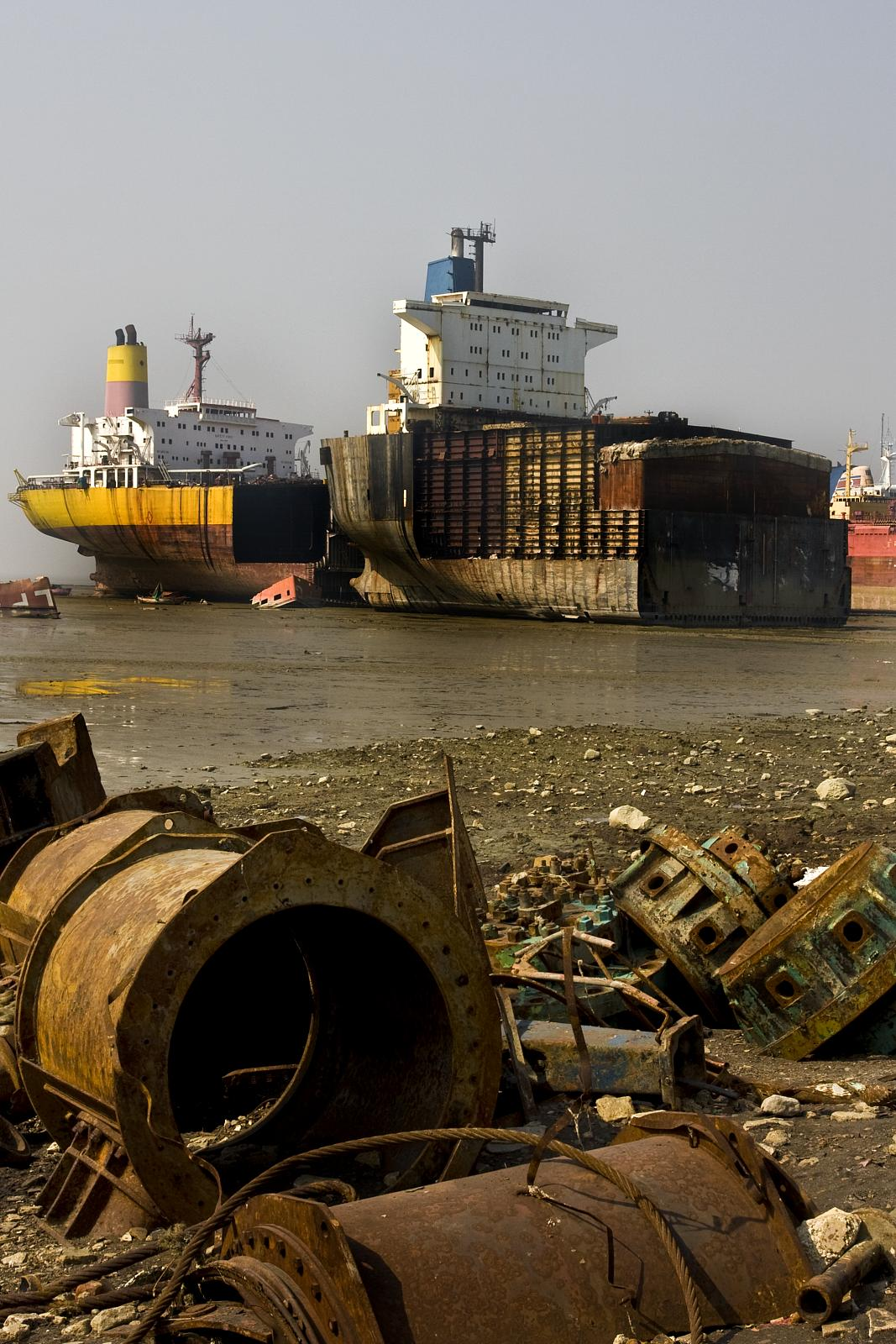
Shipbreaking Yard Bhatiari, Sitakunda

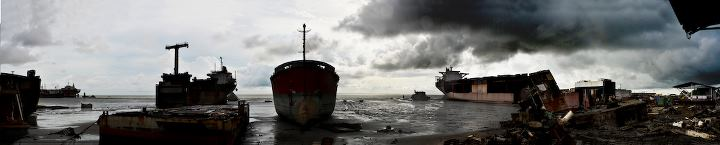
Panoramic view of a shipbreaking yard in Chittagong

== See also ==
- Alang Ship Breaking Yard
- List of ship breaking yards
