= Suell Winn House =

Historic house in Massachusetts, United States

- U.S. National Register of Historic Places
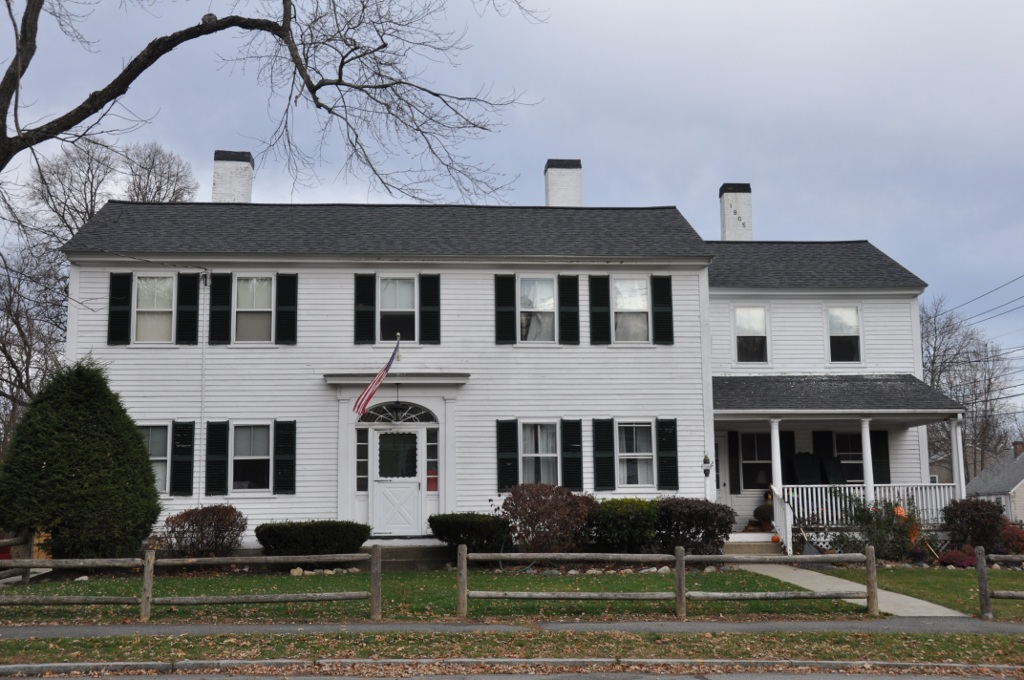

- Location within Massachusetts Location within the United States
- Location: 72-74 Elm St., Wakefield, Massachusetts
- Coordinates: 42°30′32.84″N 71°5′3.92″W
- Built: 1813
- Architectural style: Federal
- MPS: Wakefield MRA
- NRHP reference No.: 89000743
- Added to NRHP: July 6, 1989

The Suell Winn House is a historic house at 72-74 Elm Street in Wakefield, Massachusetts. The house was built c. 1805 for Major Suell Winn, a local farmer, and is one of the best representatives of Federal-style architecture in Wakefield. It is a 2 1/2-story wood-frame structure, with two interior chimneys, a five-bay facade, and an elegant doorway with sidelight windows and an architrave. An ell extends the house to the right. Winn, a native of nearby Burlington, was killed crossing the railroad that divided his landholdings, after attending a town meeting where he protested the need for improved crossing signals at that location.

The house was listed on the National Register of Historic Places in 1989.

== See also ==
- National Register of Historic Places listings in Wakefield, Massachusetts
- National Register of Historic Places listings in Middlesex County, Massachusetts
