= Suel =

Suel may refer to:

- Suel, ancient name for Fuengirola, Spain
- Suel A. Sheldon (1850–1926), American politician
- Suloise, a fictitious human race in Dungeons & Dragons
- Torsten Suel (born 1966), American computer scientist
