= Shipbreakers (film) =

- Directed by: Michael Kot
- Written by: Shelley Saywell (Narration)
- Produced by: Ed Barreveld; Michael Kot; Peter Starr
- Narrated by: Ted Biggs
- Cinematography: Derek Rogers
- Edited by: Deborah Palloway
- Music by: Ken Myhr
- Distributed by: National Film Board of Canada
- Release date: 2004
- Running time: 73 minutes
- Country: Canada
- Language: English

Shipbreakers is a 2004 documentary film. A co-production of the National Film Board of Canada with Storyline Entertainment directed by Michael Kot, the film explores the practice of ship breaking decommissioned vessels in Alang, India.

== Awards ==
- Golden Sheaf Awards for Best Director Non fiction and Best Nature/Environment Documentary
- Gemini Award for Best Photography in a Documentary Program or Series (Derek Rogers)
- Ecofilms Festival First Prize - Golden Deer Award
