= Aliağa Ship Breaking Yard =

Ship breaking yard in Aliaga, Turkey

Coordinates: 38°49′43″N 26°55′51″E

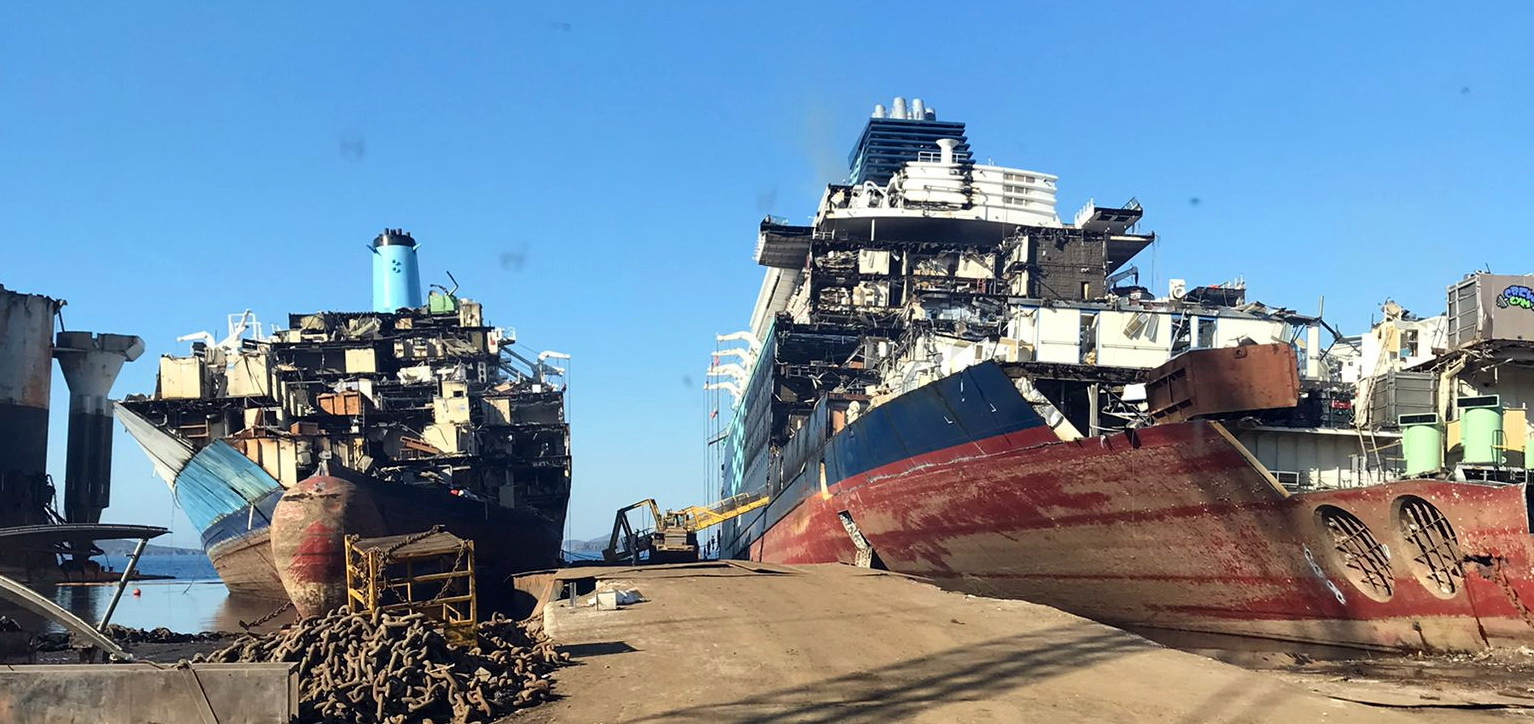
Two ships being scrapped at the yard in 2023

Aliağa Ship Breaking Yard is the world's fourth largest ship breaking yard, located across a 10-kilometre-long (6.2 mi) beachfront at Aliaga, Turkey. The yard consists of 132 ship-breaking plots.

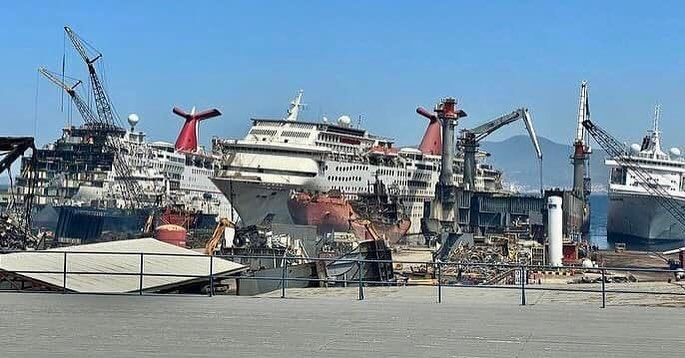
Aliaga, June 2022

== See also ==
- List of ship breaking yards
